= Eran (given name) =

Eran (Hebrew: ערן) is an Israeli masculine given name that may refer to the following notable people:

- Eran Biton (born 1996), Israeli football midfielder
- Eran Creevy, British film director
- Eran Elhaik (born 1980), Israeli-American geneticist and bioinformatician
- Eran Elinav (born 1969), Israeli immunologist
- Eran Egozy, Israeli-American video game developer
- Eran Ganot (born 1981), American college basketball coach
- Eran Groumi (born 1970), Israeli swimmer
- Eran Hadas, Israeli poet and software developer
- Eran James (born 1989), Australian singer-songwriter
- Eran Kolirin (born 1973), Israeli screenwriter and film director
- Eran Kopel, Israeli epidemiologist
- Eran Kulik (born 1946), Israeli football player and manager
- Eran Levi (born 1985), Israeli football striker
- Eran Malkin (born 1993), Israeli football midfielder
- Eran Meshorer (born 1971), Israeli epigeneticist
- Eran Neuman (born 1968), Israeli architect and architectural historian
- Eran Niv (born 1970), Israeli general
- Eran Ortal (born 1971), Israeli brigadier-general and military theorist
- Eran Preis (born 1947), Israeli–American film director, screenwriter, playwright, and producer
- Eran Prion (born 1974), Israeli musician and music producer
- Eran Rabani, Israeli theoretical chemist
- Eran Raven, American information security professional
- Eran Riklis (born 1954), Israeli filmmaker
- Eran Rosenbaum (born 1992), Israeli football midfielder
- Eran Segal (born 1973), Israeli computational biologist
- Eran Sela (born 1985), Israeli Olympic sailor
- Eran Shainzinger, Israeli football player
- Eran Shakine (born 1962), Israeli artist, painter, illustrator and sculptor
- Eran Shor, Israeli-Canadian sociologist
- Eran Tromer, Israeli computer scientist
- Eran Viezel (born 1972), Israeli biblical scholar
- Eran Wickramaratne, Sri Lankan banker and politician
- Eran Yashiv (born 1959), Israeli economist
- Eran Zahavi (born 1987), Israeli association football player
