= Sridhar Tayur =

American businessman

Sridhar R. Tayur
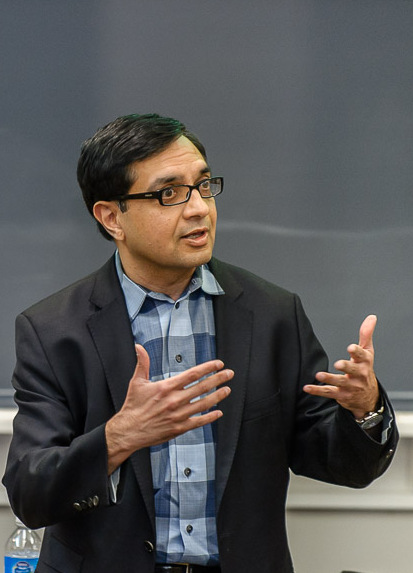
- Sridhar R. Tayur
- Education: Cornell University (Ph.D.); IIT Madras (B.Tech.)
- Awards: Member of National Academy of Engineering; INFORMS Fellow; MSOM Distinguished Fellow
- Scientific career
- Fields: operations management operations research management science
- Workplaces: Carnegie Mellon University
- Doctoral students: Pınar Keskinocak

Sridhar R. Tayur is an American business professor, entrepreneur, and management thinker. He is university professor of operations management and Ford Distinguished Research Chair at the Tepper School of Business, Carnegie Mellon University, and the founder of SmartOps Corporation and OrganJet Corporation.

Tayur is known as an "academic capitalist," recognized for his contribution to Inventory Theory, Supply Chain Management, Lean Manufacturing, Operations Strategy, Healthcare Management, and Quantum Computing. He describes his own work as "research, industrial implementation, software entrepreneurship, investing in start-ups and turnarounds, and creating a social enterprise" that lies "in the intersection of math, money, and morals." Tayur's work "has earned him a reputation as someone uniquely talented in identifying, and then solving, novel and timely problems confronting society," according to a 2014 Productions and Operations Management article honoring him.

== Education and career ==
Tayur attended Hyderabad Public School, Begumpet, an elite school in the state of Telangana. He earned his B. Tech in Mechanical Engineering from IIT Madras in 1986 and Ph.D. in operations research and industrial engineering from Cornell in 1990.

He joined Carnegie Mellon in 1991 as an assistant professor in The Graduate School of Industrial Administration (GSIA) (today known as Tepper School of Business), obtained tenure in 1996, and was promoted to full professor in 1998. In 2019, he was appointed to university professor, the highest designation a faculty member can receive at Carnegie Mellon. He holds Ford Distinguished Research Chair in Operations Management. Within Carnegie Mellon, he holds courtesy appointments in the Heinz College and Department of Electrical and Computer Engineering. He has held a courtesy appointment as professor of cardiology (2009–2011) at the Gerald McGinnis Center of West Penn Allegheny Health System. Tayur has held visiting positions at Cornell University, Massachusetts Institute of Technology, and Stanford University.

Tayur was president (2001–2002) of the Manufacturing and Service Operations Management Society (MSOM), one of the largest societies of the Institute for Operations Research and the Management Sciences (INFORMS). He has served on the editorial boards of Management Science, Operations Research, Manufacturing & Service Operations Management, IIE Transactions, Optimization and Engineering, and Productions and Operations Management, among others, and he is a department editor at Management Science, for the Entrepreneurship and Innovation Department.

Tayur founded SmartOps (in 2000) and OrganJet (in 2011), and has consulted for various organizations, including Caterpillar, ConAgra Foods, Deere, Flight Options, General Electric, GlaxoSmithKline, Intel, Kellogg's, and Microsoft. Tayur has also served as a "consultant to the firm" for McKinsey & Company in the areas of lean manufacturing and supply chain management.

== Academic work ==
=== Research ===
Tayur's work covers various operations management fields, including supply chain management, lean manufacturing, and healthcare. His papers have been published in Operations Research, Management Science, Manufacturing & Service Operations Management, Mathematics of Operations Research, Mathematical Programming, Queueing Systems, IIE Transactions, and Production and Operations Management, among others. Notable collaborators include INFORMS Fellows such as Dimitris Bertsimas, Paul Glasserman, Jack Muckstadt, Georgia Perakis, and Robin Roundy (his Ph.D. thesis advisor); faculty colleagues Alan Scheller-Wolf, R. Ravi (INFORMS Fellow), and Ravindran Kannan; and Ph.D. students Srinagesh Gavirneni, Roman Kapuscinski, Pınar Keskinocak (INFORMS Fellow), and Jay Swaminathan (INFORMS Fellow). He is recognized for his operations research work in developing novel algorithms for models in stochastic inventory theory (using Infinitesimal Perturbation Analysis).

Manufacturing, Retail and Supply Chain. Tayur developed Infinitesimal Perturbation Analysis (IPA) for stochastic inventory models, with a wide number of applications, including managing product variety using vanilla boxes, designing rapid-response supply chains, and omni-channel retailing. His 2021 National Science Foundation Distinguished Lecture, jointly sponsored by the Directorates of Engineering (ENG), Computer and Information Science and Engineering (CISE), and Mathematics and Physical Sciences (MPS), summarized his work on responsive and resilient supply chains using novel quantum and classical algorithms. In addition, he has examined the "dark side" of global supply chains, including counterfeiting and child labour.

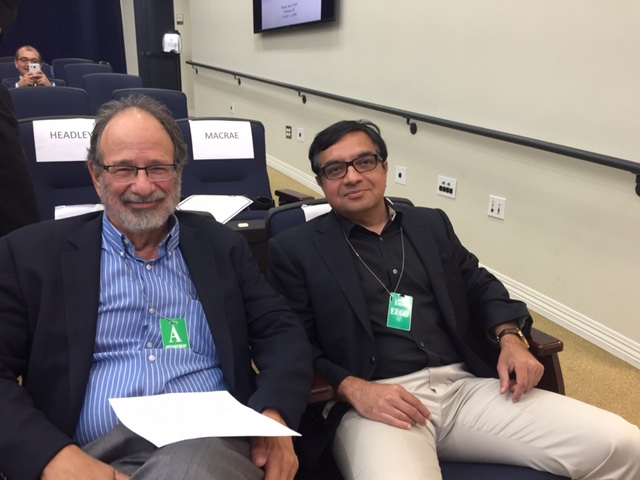
Tayur with Alvin E. Roth at the White House Summit on Organ Donation (June 2016)

Healthcare Analytics, Operations, and Policy. At Allegheny General Hospital, Tayur has conducted clinical trials that have established the clinical benefits of genotype guided therapeutic dosing of warfarin therapy. Tayur's work with Dr. Bennet Omalu, whose discovery of chronic traumatic encephalopathy (CTE) was featured in the movie Concussion, applies OM methods to improve Medical Examiner Offices. In the area of long-term care, Tayur has examined ways to improve the consistency of staffing and proposed an "on-call pool" approach.

To address the fundamental problem of scarcity of supply of organs, Tayur has collaborated with the New Jersey Sharing Network and Nevada Donor Network, among other organ procurement organizations (OPOs), to investigate behavioral approaches that will increase the consent rate from legal next of kin (NOK) of deceased individuals through video intervention. This work attracted the attention of the White House Office of Science and Technology Policy and was featured at the 24th Association for Multicultural Affairs in Transplantation Annual Meeting in 2016. He has studied various aspects of split liver transplantation, including ethics, learning, and decisions support to determine optimal splitting policy, in collaboration with University of California, San Francisco transplant surgeons. His research on geographic disparity, gender inequity and video nudge were discussed at the National Academies of Sciences, Engineering, and Medicine Committee on "A Fairer and More Equitable, Cost-Effective, and Transparent System of Donor Organ Procurement, Allocation, and Distribution."

Tayur supports finding other innovative methods to increase organ donation and supports the need for clarification to be able to conduct further research. Tayur has engaged other researchers, transplant surgeons, and policy bodies, as well as students, by serving on the organizing committee of the 2016 Johns Hopkins Symposium on Healthcare Operations, with a theme of "When Organ Transplantation meets Operations Research," and by speaking on "Effective and Innovative Solutions to Increase Organ Donation" at the Harvard Effective Altruist Chapter.

Tayur has studied personalized treatment for opioid use disorder, specifically, the efficacy of using wearables to prevent relapse.

In collaboration with the University of Pittsburgh Medical Center, Tayur developed machine learning algorithms to predict hospital re-admissions due to sickle-cell disease.

In addition to his applied work, Tayur has adopted a strategic queueing approach to investigate (1) physicians' diagnostic test-ordering behavior in outpatient settings and (2) the effect of multi-listing—powered by affordable jet services (OrganJet)—on U.S. organ transplantation candidates' life expectancy and organ wastage. Tayur has also analyzed combinatorial models (using quantum- and quantum-inspired algorithms) and conducted topological data analysis (using algebraic topology) to study cancer genomics, using data on acute myeloid leukemia and Glioblastoma Multiforme from The Cancer Genome Atlas.

Tayur has explored improved data-driven methods towards making Liquid Biopsy practical.

New Business Models. Tayur's research has analyzed new business models such as scheduling of fractional jets, online rental models, online to offline (O2O) platforms, dynamic scheduling of advertisements in video games, and an entrepreneurial approach to the widespread adoption of multiple listing for organ transplantation.

=== Books ===
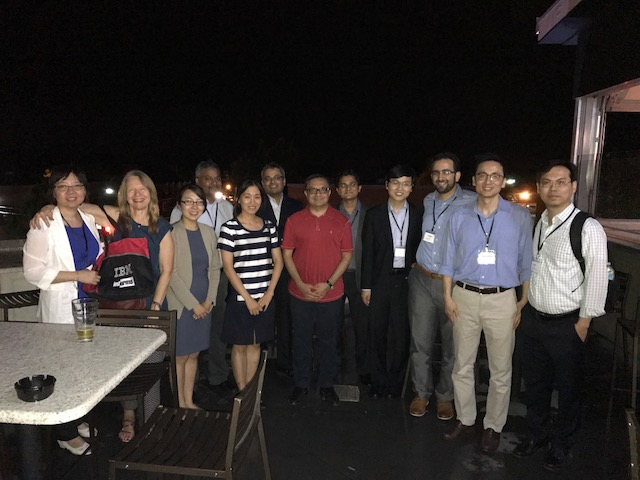
A group of operations management scholars met to celebrate the Handbook of Healthcare Analytics at the 2017 MSOM Annual Meeting held at University of North Carolina at Chapel Hill (June 2017).

Tayur's co-edited volume, Quantitative Models for Supply Chain Management (Springer, 1999), is among the most popular reference books on supply chain modeling. Another, Handbook of Healthcare Analytics: Theoretical Minimum for Conducting 21st Century Research on Healthcare Operations (John Wiley & Sons, 2018), covers a wide scope of contemporary topics and provides timely access to modern analytical tools; the handbook is an "important volume" that "represents some of the brightest minds in analytics research, as well as physicians and senior healthcare executives."

=== Teaching ===
Tayur has won various undergraduate and MBA teaching awards, including the George Leland Bach Excellence in Teaching Award. One of Tayur's teaching cases, entitled “Managing Operations in the Time-Shared Jet Business," won First Prize for the INFORMS Teaching Case Award in 2000, and another, "Patient Experience Improvement at UPMC Eye Center," won Second Prize for the same award in 2012. In his chapter on "Operations Management MBA Teaching in 21st Century Business Schools," Tayur identifies five shared shortcomings between the “Harvard approach” (case study) and “Carnegie approach” (mathematical models), suggesting a way to build on the best of both. He also notes entrepreneurship (including social enterprises) and the increased number of female MBAs as two important topics that need to be addressed more centrally in MBA education, with a goal of achieving the "higher aims" of management education beyond creating just another generation of "hired hands."

In collaboration with USRA/NASA and Amazon, and with NSF support, he developed a new course focused on Quantum Integer Programming (QuIP) in 2020, and expanded it to include Quantum Machine Learning (QuML) in 2021.

Tayur has also taught in executive education programs for various companies, including McKinsey & Company, Cisco Systems, and Schibsted.

=== Recognitions ===
Tayur was named one of the four “Masters of Supply-Chain Efficiency” by Fortune Magazine, and a “Most Popular Professor” by BusinessWeek. He has been ranked as one of the stellar operations management researchers.

In 2012, Tayur was elected as a fellow of INFORMS for his lifetime achievements in “research on inventories and supply chain management, and developing new methodologies, implementing software in manufacturing, logistics and supply chains, and creating a market for enterprise inventory optimization software.” (Note: The importance of inventory control to economic productivity has been widely recognized, including by the Nobel-winning economist Paul Krugman, who states that, "The big productivity gains of the period from 1995 to 2005 came largely in things like inventory control" (See "The Big Meh", by Paul Krugman).)

In 2017, Tayur was elected as a Distinguished Fellow of MSOM. In the same year, he was elected as a Member of the National Academy of Engineering for "developing and commercializing innovative methods to optimize supply chain systems."

=== Awards ===
In the field of Healthcare Management, Tayur's paper "Imaging Room and Beyond: The Underlying Economics Behind Physicians’ Test-Ordering Behavior in Outpatient Services" won first place in the 2012 Production and Operations Management Society (POMS) College of Healthcare Operations Management's Best Paper Competition. In 2015, he won the Pierskalla Award for Best Paper in Healthcare from INFORMS, for his paper, "OrganJet: Overcoming geographical disparities in access to deceased donor kidneys in the United States;" in 2019. The same paper was recognized as a finalist for the inaugural INFORMS MSOM Society's Award for Responsible Research in Operations Management. In 2021, his working paper titled "Toward a Liquid Biopsy: Greedy Approximation Algorithms for Active Sequential Hypothesis Testing" won the Pierskalla Award for Best Paper in Healthcare. In 2022, he received the Manufacturing & Service Operations Management journal's Best Published Paper Award for his work on combating child labor in global supply chains.

His work with John Deere—which reduced over $1B in inventory in just four years—was a finalist for the Edelman Prize. His PhD students have won a number of awards, including the George Nicholson Prize in 1996 and the George B. Dantzig Dissertation Award in 2011.

Tayur's work on integer programming using Gröbner basis was a finalist for the Frederick W. Lanchester Prize.

In 2018, Tayur was chosen by Indian Institute of Technology Madras as a recipient of the 2018 Distinguished Alumni Awards (DAA).

== “Academic Capitalist” ==
As a serial entrepreneur and an active promoter of monetizing operations research, Tayur coined the term “academic capitalist.” (Note: "Academic Capitalist" is similar to "Scientific Entrepreneur" (See "The Scientific Life; A moral history of a late modern vocation", by Steven Shapin), and can be considered as a modern version of "craftsman-scholar" (See "The Lever of Riches; Technological Creativity and Economic Progress", by Joel Mokyr).) Tayur is a charter member of The Indus Entrepreneurs (TiE), and has served as a mentor for TiE ScaleUp.

=== SmartOps ===
In 2000, Tayur founded the software company SmartOps Corporation, after winning the first prize in the EnterPrize Case Competition that year, and served as its CEO until 2012.

Through SmartOps, Tayur also coined the phrase "fix the mix" to refer to the approach of adjusting inventory levels for various items to meet target service levels with lower overall inventory investment. Several SmartOps customers, including Cabot Corporation, Celestica, ConAgra, Dow Chemical Company, Johnson & Johnson, Kohler Company, Lubrizol, LSI Corporation, Medtronic, PPG Industries, Wyeth, have spoken about their successes with Enterprise Inventory Optimization (EIO).

SmartOps was in a revenue sharing contract agreement with SAP AG, until February 2013, when SAP AG announced that it would acquire SmartOps to develop a real-time supply chain software that allows its customers to "run their businesses in real time—to analyze, predict, react and adjust instantly." Through this acquisition, SAP was able to offer an integrated inventory management software, allowing its clients to "manage the increased supply chain risk due to economic uncertainty, escalating customer expectations, demand volatility, and supply variability they face."

Tayur has been recognized for his entrepreneurship of SmartOps Corporation by the Carnegie Science Center Award for Innovation in Information Technology, and has been the subject of University of Virginia Darden School of Business's MBA Teaching case “SmartOps Corporation: Forging Smart Alliances?”

=== OrganJet and GuardianWings ===
In 2011, Tayur founded the social enterprise OrganJet Corporation, which facilities multiple listings and provides on-demand private jet transportation for patients to receive organ transplantation in a wider geographic range. Since the founding of OrganJet, Tayur's "entrepreneurial approach to reform [the] organ waiting list" has caught the attention of Nobel Laureate Alvin E. Roth, among other preeminent economists. In addition, OrganJet has been covered by the AOL/MAKERS initiative and by the media in regions suffering from geographic disparity in waiting times for organ transplants, such as Boston, Denver, and Wisconsin.

In July 2012, with the founding of GuardianWings, Tayur became the first social entrepreneur to start a “contract hybrid,” in which a for-profit entity (OrganJet) is symbiotically integrated with a not-for-profit subsidiary (GuardianWings) sharing a common social mission of providing inclusive access to organ transplantation. (Note: The notion of “contract hybrids,” as a new legal entity, was first proposed by Bromberger (2011) as a method to obtain the best of “for-profit” and “not-for-profit” entities, and further explored by Battilana et al. (2012)) A 2013 Harvard Business School case titled "OrganJet and GuardianWings" (by Julie Battilana and James Weber), covering the decision process behind the organizational structure of OrganJet and GuardianWings, has been taught at Harvard Business School. The case has also been used by the University of Michigan's Ross School of Business, among other business schools, in its course "The Corporation in Society," where Tayur was interviewed by the instructor Jim Walsh. Students were asked to write responses to the question "If you were Sridhar Tayur, how do you think about your aspirations to establish OrganJet and GuardianWings, change the current transplant system in America, honor your commitments to Carnegie-Mellon University, and live a full life?" In an interview with The Guardian, Tayur said that the hybrid model was more efficient than a traditional pure for-profit or not-for-profit: "It would have been much easier for me to have said it's a not-for-profit or a for-profit and satisfy the skeptics. But the primary goal of my company is to help as many people as possible get transplants quicker."

On August 7, 2013, it was announced that Irena Bucci, a resident of the Washington D.C. area, successfully received a kidney transplant in Pittsburgh through the service provided by OrganJet. In June 2014, OrganJet sponsored a “Transplants” campaign with Mediaplanet and USA Today aiming to increase the public's awareness of the importance of organ donation. On August 20, 2013, OrganJet released a free self-service App to help chronic kidney disease patients find a low wait kidney transplant center in the US.

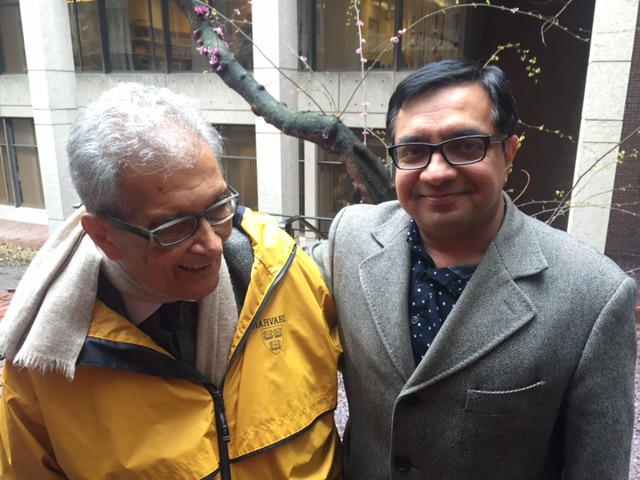
Tayur with Amartya Sen at Harvard Square (May 2016)

A 2014 piece in The Atlantic, "A Private Jet Is Waiting to Take You to Your Kidney Transplant" detailed Tayur's motivation behind founding OrganJet and the company's latest developments. In discussing geographic inequality in organ transplantation, a 2014 The New England Journal of Medicine article cited OrganJet as an example of mobilizing the recipients (instead of mobilizing the organs) that would face less of the "political resistance that has stood in the way of broader organ sharing to date." The American Journal of Transplantation, in its February 2015 issue of "The AJT Report," mentioned Tayur and his work through OrganJet as one of "grassroots groups and organizations formed to improve the quality of life for transplant candidates, recipients, their families, and the families of organ and tissue donors." Tayur and OrganJet have also been profiled in The Craft of Creativity, Ars Technica, Forbes, and Vice News.

OrganJet has been featured in research seminars in leading universities, including Cornell University, Harvard University, MIT, Stanford University, and University of Chicago. OrganJet has also been featured at Harvard Kennedy School's New World Social Enterprise Fellows Program, where Tayur showcased OrganJet as an operational example of John Rawls's difference principle, as well as at the Leadership for System Change: Delivering Social Impact at Scale Program for Schwab Fellows since 2017.

Tayur pioneered the use of nudge videos to increase tissue and organ donations by increasing consent from next of kins, which are now adopted by a number of organ procurement organizations. He has provided remarks to the National Academies of Sciences, Engineering, and Medicine Committee for A Fairer and More Equitable, Cost-Effective and Transparent System of Organ Procurement, Allocation, and Distribution (covering OrganJet, exception points to reduce gender disparity in liver allocation, and the use of nudge videos to increase organ and tissue supply), and comments on fair liver allocation to reduce gender disparity.

=== Limited partner in PE and VC firms ===
Tayur was a member of the advisory board and a limited partner of CCG Inc. (2001–2010), a private equity firm devoted to applying lean manufacturing techniques at small manufacturing firms and creating new jobs. He is a limited partner and member of the advisory board of NeoTribe Ventures. He is a limited partner in TiePittsburgh Angels, that makes direct investments as well is a limited partner in 412 Venture Fund.

=== Angel Investor ===
He is (or has been) an investor in and/or member of the advisory boards of Vendia, Onera (later acquired by ToolsGroup), Fathomd, and VocaliD (later acquired by Veritone). He was previously an advisor to Zenrez and MitraBiotech. In addition, he serves on the board of directors of Transplant Interface. He was a member of the board of directors of Orchestro, a software-as-a-service based analytics platform that was later acquired by E2open.

== “Management mechanics” ==
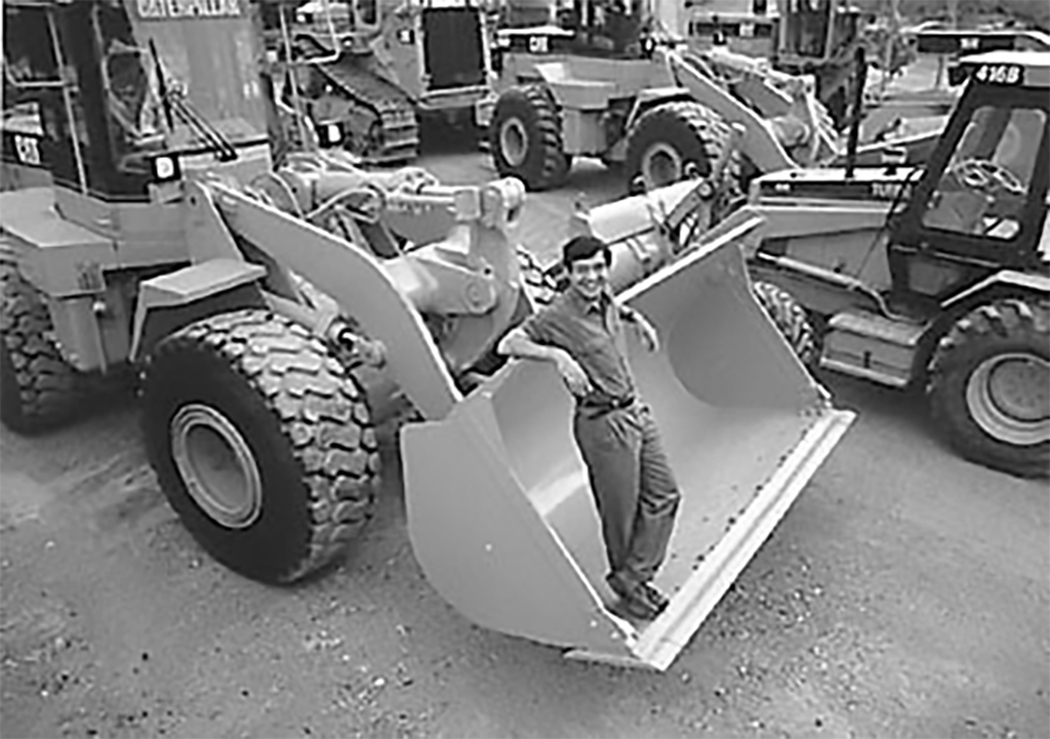
Tayur posing in a Caterpillar attachment whose supply chain he designed (1998)

In line with Herbert A. Simon's reflection that “executive centrifuges” are needed for a science of “judgment mechanics,” Tayur proposed the term "management mechanics," a methodical way to conduct quantitative-model-based "management consulting" that also allows for systematic implementation of sustaintable organizational change using enterprise information technology. A wide range of "what if" analysis allows senior executives to tackle practical problems in operations management (PPOMs) in the spirit of Peter Drucker's views on Management Science.

PPOMs can lie "inside the factory," "outside the factory," or in the "interfaces between the inside and the outside of the factory." PPOMs in product companies (across a variety of industries) include designing rapid response supply chains, optimizing product portfolios, implementing a postponement strategy, planning production with significant changeover times and costs, reducing net landed cost in procurement, optimizing working capital needs to meet service levels, operating a global supply chain using S&OP process, quoting accurate lead times, and designing a seasonal logistics strategy through a gain sharing contract. Management Mechanics helps executives make sound judgements on strategic decisions that may span multiple organizational silos in their firm or even cross firm boundaries.

In 1999, Tayur coined the term "planned spontaneity" to describe firms' supply-side strategy to create and respond to consumer demands spontaneously. The term has now been used to describe a new wave of technology enterprises aiming to satisfy last-minute consumer demands.

== Deep computing ==
Through SmartOps, Tayur has also explored massively parallel versions of enterprise inventory optimization (EIO) algorithms on IBM's Blue Gene. In 2005, as Blue Gene's first supply chain application, the IBM-SmartOps pilot solved industrial scale problems with more than a million variables in 0.04 seconds on a "half rack" system with 512 processors.

== Quantum computing ==
With the objective of "making quantum computing as a service a reality," Tayur created the Quantum Computing Group at Carnegie Mellon in 2017 to study optimization problems―motivated by operations research and operations management applications―by bringing ideas and methods from algebraic geometry, geometry of numbers and algebraic topology to quantum computing. The research program has several thrusts:

1. Use computational algebraic geometry and Knuth–Bendix completion algorithm to compile on quantum computers (both AQC and NISQ).
2. Develop novel hybrid quantum-classical algorithms and quantum-inspired classical Graver Augmented Multi-seed Algorithm (GAMA) for non-linear integer optimization with non-convex objective functions. The group has conducted numerical testing on D-Wave of their new hybrid quantum-classical algorithm to compute Graver basis, which is known to be useful in many applications of non-linear integer optimization and game theory and use it for optimization. The group has applied the above algorithms to Cancer Genomics to study acute myeloid leukemia.
3. The group is also the first to introduce Morse theory, Cerf theory (from algebraic topology), and Gauss–Bonnet theorem (from differential geometry) to understand adiabatic quantum computation at a fundamental level by studying the deformation of Hamiltonian surface and evolution of (and around) anti-crossings.
4. In collaboration with NASA's Quantum Artificial Intelligence Lab (QuAIL), the group has developed mathematical programming methods for minor-embedding in quantum annealers such as D-Wave.

In 2020, with support from National Science Foundation and in partnership with Universities Space Research Association and Amazon, he co-developed and co-taught a course on Quantum Integer Programming, which is freely available to students and researchers around the globe. In 2021, this course was expanded to include Quantum Machine Learning.

Tayur's work on quantum computing has been covered by Ars Technica and Notices of the American Mathematical Society. In 2020, he was inducted into Pittsburgh Quantum Institute, as the first business school professor to join as a member. In a 2020 interview with Fortune, he endorsed the White House's proposed budget that doubled the Federal spending for artificial intelligence and quantum computing, citing the governments' crucial role in fueling basic research and that major tech firms such as Alphabet and Facebook “are doing research in A.I. that benefits their business models.” He is an executive committee member of Pittsburgh Quantum Institute.

== Unconventional computing ==
Tayur's TEDxCMU2020 talk discusses "Magical Unconventional Computing beyond Quantum." He is currently developing and supporting research on room-temperature Ising machines with collaborators from IIT Madras and National University of Singapore.

== Quantum communications ==
Quantum queue-channels arise naturally in the context of buffering in quantum networks. Collaborating with researchers at IIT-Madras, Tayur has studied Unital Qubit (that includes the important case of symmetric Generalized Amplitude Damping) channels and shown that the maximum classical capacity can be achieved without entanglement.

He has been a promoter of public-private collaboration in quantum communication and computing, especially in regard with supply chains (and infrastructure) for quantum technologies.

== Personal life ==
Tayur was born in Madras (now Chennai) in India to a Kannada-speaking family. His father was in the Indian Administrative Service. Tayur is married to Gunjan Kedia, and they have two sons. Tayur and Kedia supported Barack Obama in the 2008 Presidential election.

== Philanthropy ==
Education. In April 2014, Carnegie Mellon University received a $1 million gift from Tayur and his wife Gunjan Kedia, a Tepper alumna (MSIA ’94). This gift was to help construct the Tepper Quadrangle that will house the new Tepper School of Business building. In February 2016, Tayur launched a new Institute Chair at IIT Madras.

Film. Tayur's charitable foundation, RAGS Family Foundation, was created to support various documentaries. The film Journey to Normal, featured by The Shriver Report, profiles several female veterans, including Christine Mau, who became the first woman to fly an F-35 Fighter Jet. The foundation also supports Silk Screen Asian American Film Festival, one of the largest Asian film festivals in the U.S., including providing the funding for the annual People's Choice Award. He is also a donor to Tull Family Theater in Sewickley, Pennsylvania.

He is an Executive Producer of Vax Wars (2021). Through SmartOps in 2010 and the RAGS Foundation in 2013, Tayur supported WBCN and The American Revolution, a feature-length documentary film. In 2018, he became an Executive Producer of the film. In 2019, it won Best Documentary Feature at DC Independent Film Festival, was the Centerpiece Documentary at the Boston Independent Film Festival and an Official Selection at Conquest Film Festival and Woods Hole Film Festival. The film is distributed through PBS, viewable on more than 100 channels nationwide in November 2021.

Tayur has also been a member of the Leadership Donor Group at the Brattle Film Foundation and a member of the advisory board of TrueSpark, a non-profit seeking to engage at-risk middle school youth using motion pictures.

In an interview with Variety about the lack of diversity in Disney's C-suite, Tayur advocated for a systematic approach: “Even if there are many talented or capable people, it takes time to sift through and make sure there is some kind of a process, and this is not done haphazardly... Frankly, it's not enough to put a few people in the C-suite. You don't want to give the impression that it's window dressing.”

Public Television. Tayur served on the Board of Overseers and was a Ralph Lowell Society member of WGBH, in which capacity he helped bring organ donation topics to wide public awareness through the PBS-OZY collaboration late-night TV show, Point Taken. WBCN and The American Revolution premiered on WGBH-TV and PBS stations in the Fall of 2021 and is now available for streaming on Amazon Prime.

Medical Research and Healthcare. Since 2009, Tayur has funded neuroscience research in Dr. Beverly Davidson's laboratory at Children's Hospital of Philadelphia (previously at University of Iowa) that utilizes RNA interference to find therapy for rare genetic disorders like SCA2. He has also supported Massachusetts General Hospital's organ transplantation research through sponsoring its "2015 Transplant Golf Classic" event. He serves on the board of directors of Heritage Valley Health System.

Policy Advice. At the National Academies, Tayur has provided oversight to publication in the area of supply chain resiliency and served as an external reviewer on Policy Options for Sustainable and Resilient Supply Chains. He has also consulted for a White House special committee dealing with the 2022 United States infant formula shortage.

Other. Tayur has served as a policy advisor to the Polaris Project to counter human trafficking. Tayur and his wife have also been long-time donors to Plan International, Children International, Childreach International, CARE, Smile Train, and American Red Cross, and have supported microfinance through Kiva for several years. They are also donors to Innocence Project, RIP Medical Debt, and Feeding America. Through SmartOps, Tayur sponsored the 12th Social Enterprise Conference at Harvard Business School, the MIT Sloan Annual Operations Simulation Competition in 2010 and 2011, and the Els for Autism 2011 Golf Challenge.

== Publications ==
- Dai, Tinglong; Tayur, Sridhar, eds. (2018). Handbook of Healthcare Analytics: Theoretical Minimum for Conducting 21st Century Research on Healthcare Operations. John Wiley & Sons, Inc. ISBN 978-1-119-30094-6.
- Tayur, Sridhar; Ganeshan, Ram; Magazine, Michael, eds. (1999). Quantitative Models for Supply Chain Management. Springer. ISBN 978-0-7923-8344-4.

Book chapters:

- Dai, Tinglong; Tayur, Sridhar (2017). "The Evolutionary Trends of POM Research in Manufacturing". In Starr, M. K.; Gupta, S. K. (eds.). The Routledge Companion to Production and Operations Management. London, U.K.: Routledge. pp. 647–662. ISBN 978-1-138-91959-4.
- Keskinocak, Pinar; Tayur, Sridhar (2004). "Due Date Management Policies". In Simchi-Levi, D.; Wu, D.; Shen, Z.-J. (eds.). Handbook of Quantitative Supply Chain Analysis. International Series in Operations Research & Management Science. Vol. 74. pp. 485–554. CiteSeerX 10.1.1.207.722. doi:10.1007/978-1-4020-7953-5_12. ISBN 978-1-4757-1074-8. ISSN 0884-8289.
- Kapuscinski, Roman; Tayur, Sridhar (1999). "Optimal Policies and Simulation-Based Optimization for Capacitated Production Inventory Systems". In Tayur, Sridhar; Ganeshan, Ram; Magazine, Michael (eds.). Quantitative Models for Supply Chain Management. International Series in Operations Research & Management Science. Vol. 17. pp. 7–40. doi:10.1007/978-1-4615-4949-9_2. ISBN 978-1-4613-7246-2. ISSN 0884-8289.
