= ERAN =

ERAN or Eran may refer to:

== People ==
- Eran (given name)
- Oded Eran (1941–2023), former Israeli diplomat

== Places ==
- Eran, India, a city site in Sagar district in Madhya Pradesh state in India

== Other ==
- Early right anterior negativity, a part of the electroencephalogram

== See also ==
- Iran (disambiguation)
