= Geopolitics, Supply Chains, and International Relations in East Asia =

2021 book by Etel Solingen

- Editors: Etel Solingen
- Language: English
- Subject: Geopolitics
- Genre: Nonfiction
- Published: May 2021
- Publisher: Cambridge University Press
- Publication place: United States
- Media type: Paperback
- Pages: 319
- ISBN: 978-110-898546-8

Geopolitics, Supply Chains, and International Relations in East Asia is a nonfiction edited volume by American political scientist Etel Solingen.

== Background ==
The book discusses global supply chains (GSCs) with respect to the geopolitics of East Asia. It is funded by University of California's Institute on Global Conflict and Cooperation under the Office of the President Laboratory Fees Research Program.

== Reception ==
Writing for the Journal of Strategic Security, Dennis L.C. Weng of Sam Houston State University writes, "This book provides a timely evaluation of the GSCs in today’s geopolitical competition. By delineating the evolution of GSCs in Asia over the last several decades and providing a concrete theoretical explanation of the structure of GSCs, this book helps advance our understanding of the relationship between geopolitical tensions and international economic exchanges. While the book attempts to stretch out the reciprocal interactions between geopolitics and international trade relations, each country’s traditional national security concerns may hinder the GSC integration and potentially lead to more dangerous confrontation has received less attention."

In the Journal of Chinese Political Science, Ka Zeng of University of Arkansas writes, "The book has devoted some attention to how GSC integration may affect domestic socio-economic outcomes such as inequality or labor rights attention. While these issues deserve more systematic analysis, it is understandable that such an endeavor would be beyond the scope of this volume."
