= Iran (disambiguation) =

Iran, officially the Islamic Republic of Iran, is a country in Southwest Asia.

Iran may also refer to:

== Places ==
- Pahlavi Iran, officially known as the Imperial State of Iran (1925–1979)
- Qajar Iran, officially known as the Sublime State of Iran (1789–1925)
- Zand Iran, officially known as the Guarded Domains of Iran (1751–1794)
- Afsharid Iran, officially known as the Guarded Domains of Iran (1736–1796)
- Safavid Iran, officially known as the Guarded Domains of Iran (1501–1736)
- Ilkhanate, officially known at the time as Iran, or the land of Iran (1256–1335)
- Greater Iran, refers to the regions that have significant Iranian cultural influence
- Iranian plateau
- Īrānwīj
- Iran, the alternate name of the village of Irancheh in Iran
- Iranshahr (city)
- Iran Mountains, a range of mountains on the island of Borneo
- Iran Kharab, a fortified camp founded by Iranian ruler Nader Shah in Dagestan (present-day Russia)

== Media ==
- Islamic Republic of Iran Broadcasting
- National Iranian Radio and Television
- Iran (newspaper)
- Iran: Journal of the British Institute of Persian Studies

== Music ==
- Ey Iran, a famous and popular anthem in Iran
- "Iran Iran", a popular single by Mohammad Nouri

== Transport ==
- Iran Air Tours
- Iran Aseman Airlines
- Iranian Air Transport
- Iran Air

== People ==
- Iran (given name), list of people with the name

== Iranian studies ==
- Iranian studies
- Iranian peoples
- Iranian languages
- Encyclopædia Iranica

== Other uses ==
- Iran (word)
- Iranistan, a Moorish Revival mansion in the U.S. city of Bridgeport, Connecticut
- IRAN, an international military/technical acronym for "Inspect, Repair As Necessary", a term to describe scheduled refurbishment inspections of products and equipment to prevent future failure, see Project High Wire

== See also ==
- Name of Iran
- Outline of Iran
- List of Iran-related topics
- New Iran Party (disambiguation)
- Irani (disambiguation)
- Persia (disambiguation)
- Persian (disambiguation)
