= Oded Hod =

Israeli biophysicist and physical chemist

- עודד הוד
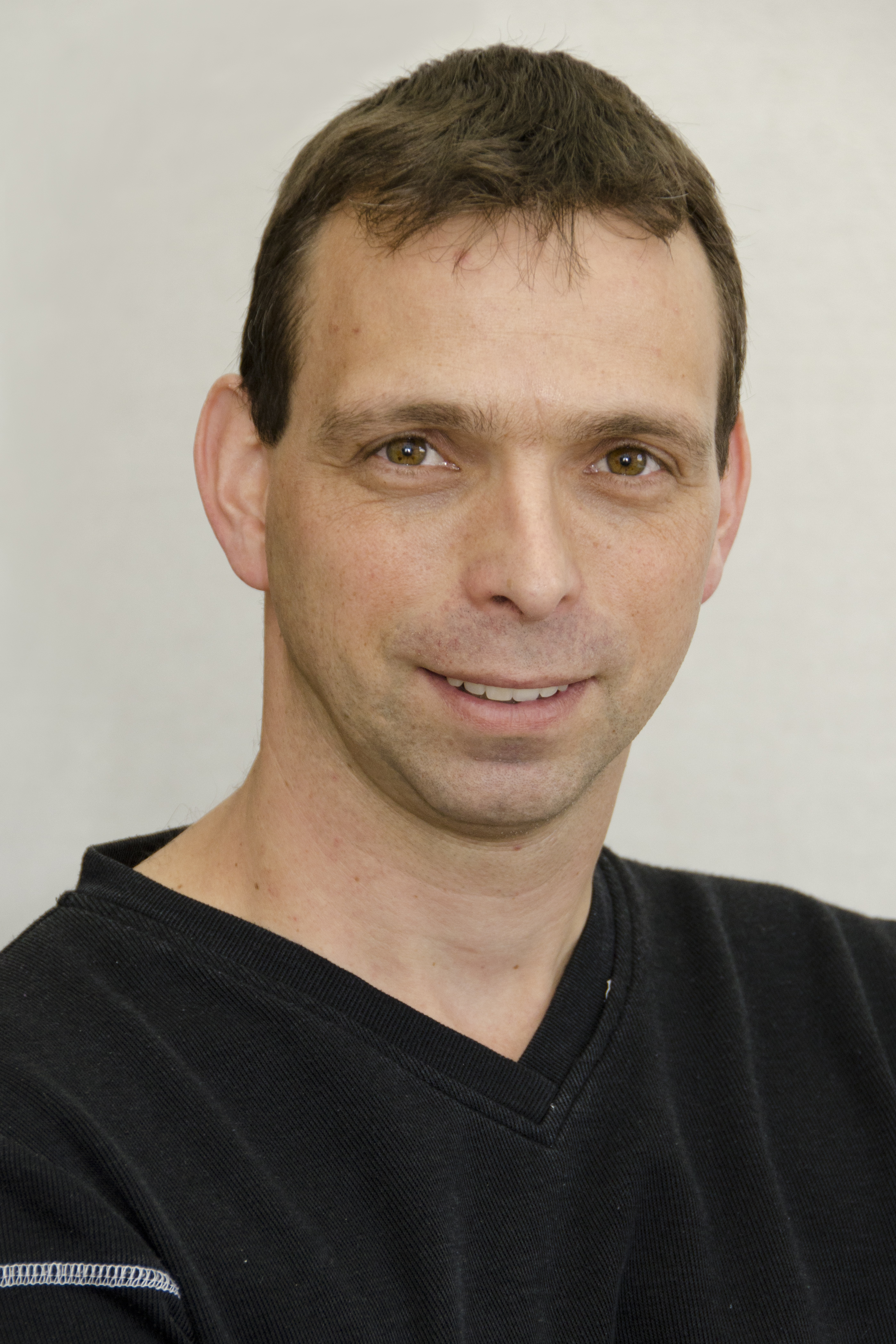
- Hos in 2012
- Education: Hebrew University of Jerusalem (B.Sc., 1994); Tel Aviv University (PhD, 2005)
- Occupations: theoretical chemistry, physical chemist
- Employer: Tel Aviv University
- Title: The Heinemann Chair of Physical Chemistry
- Website: tau.ac.il/~odedhod

Oded Hod (Hebrew: עודד הוד) is an Israeli biophysicist and physical chemist. He is a full professor at the School of Chemistry of Tel Aviv University and is the Heinemann Chair of Physical Chemistry.

== Education and career ==
From 1991 to 1994, Hod did his undergraduate studies at the Hebrew University in chemistry (major) and physics (minor) as part of the academic reserve officers' training corps (Atuda). Upon completing his degree, he commenced his army service in the IAF, where he served during 1994–1998. He then moved to the Ministry of Defense, continuing his service until 2000.

From 2000 to 2005, Hod studied towards a Ph.D. degree in Theoretical Chemistry at Tel Aviv University under the supervision of Eran Rabani and Roi Baer. From 2005 to 2008, he was a post-doctoral fellow at Rice University, specializing in Computational Chemistry.

From 2010 to 2012 he headed the Israeli CECAM node, based at Tel Aviv University.

From 2012 to 2017, he was a member of the Israeli Young Academy.

== Selected publications ==
- Hod, Oded; Barone, Veronica; Peralta, Juan E.; Scuseria, Gustavo E. (2007-08-08). "Enhanced Half-Metallicity in Edge-Oxidized Zigzag Graphene Nanoribbons". Nano Letters. 7 (8): 2295–2299. arXiv:0704.2043. Bibcode:2007NanoL...7.2295H. doi:10.1021/nl0708922. ISSN 1530-6984. PMID 17628112.
- Hod, Oded; Barone, Verónica; Scuseria, Gustavo E. (2008-01-10). "Half-metallic graphene nanodots: A comprehensive first-principles theoretical study". Physical Review B. 77 (3) 035411. arXiv:0709.0938. Bibcode:2008PhRvB..77c5411H. doi:10.1103/PhysRevB.77.035411.
- Marom, Noa; Bernstein, Jonathan; Garel, Jonathan; Tkatchenko, Alexandre; Joselevich, Ernesto; Kronik, Leeor; Hod, Oded (2010-07-19). "Stacking and Registry Effects in Layered Materials: The Case of Hexagonal Boron Nitride". Physical Review Letters. 105 (4) 046801. arXiv:1002.1728. Bibcode:2010PhRvL.105d6801M. doi:10.1103/PhysRevLett.105.046801. PMID 20867872.
- Hod, Oded (2012-04-10). "Graphite and Hexagonal Boron-Nitride have the Same Interlayer Distance. Why?". Journal of Chemical Theory and Computation. 8 (4): 1360–1369. arXiv:1109.3813. Bibcode:2012JCTC....8.1360H. doi:10.1021/ct200880m. ISSN 1549-9618. PMID 26596751.
