= Elinav =

Elinav is a surname. Notable people with the surname include:

- Eran Elinav (born 1969), Israeli immunologist
- Shira Elinav (born 2000), Israeli footballer
