= Yoram Alhassid =

Israeli-American theoretical physicist

- Citizenship: Israeli-American
- Education: Hebrew University of Jerusalem (B.Sc., 1974; Ph.D., 1979)
- Known for: Shell model Monte Carlo methods Statistical theory of quantum dots Nuclear level density calculations
- Awards: Alfred P. Sloan Fellowship (1984); Alexander von Humboldt Senior Scientist Award (2001); Fellow of the American Physical Society (2001)
- Scientific career
- Fields: Theoretical physics
- Institutions: Yale University
- Doctoral advisor: Raphael David Levine

Yoram Alhassid is an Israeli-American theoretical physicist and the Frederick Phineas Rose Professor of Physics at Yale University. He is known for his contributions to nuclear many-body theory, mesoscopic physics, cold atom physics, and quantum chaos, with a focus on correlated quantum many-body systems in which finite-size effects play an important role.

== Education and early career ==
Alhassid received his B.Sc. in physics and mathematics with special distinction from the Hebrew University of Jerusalem in 1974, and his Ph.D. in physics from the same institution in 1979, working under the supervision of Raphael David Levine. His doctoral thesis, titled "On the Information Theoretic Approach to Nuclear Reactions," was awarded the Aharon Katzir Prize, given to one doctoral recipient for excellence in natural sciences in Israel.

After completing his doctorate, Alhassid was a Chaim Weizmann Research Fellow in Physics at the California Institute of Technology from 1979 to 1981.

== Career at Yale ==
Alhassid joined the Yale University Department of Physics as an assistant professor in 1981. He was promoted to associate professor in 1984, received tenure in 1987, and became a full professor in 1990. In 2017, he was appointed the Frederick Phineas Rose Professor of Physics.

== Research ==
Alhassid's research program spans nuclear physics, mesoscopic physics and nanoscience, cold atomic gases, and quantum chaos. A unifying theme is the development of computational and analytical methods for finite-size correlated quantum many-body systems.

=== Nuclear many-body theory ===
Alhassid and his collaborators researched the development and application of the auxiliary-field Monte Carlo approach, known as the shell model Monte Carlo (SMMC) method, for the microscopic calculation of nuclear statistical properties. The SMMC method enables calculations in model spaces that are many orders of magnitude larger than those accessible to conventional diagonalization methods. These calculations have yielded results for nuclear level densities, which are among the most important statistical nuclear properties and serve as key inputs for the Hauser–Feshbach theory of compound nuclear reactions.

An advance by Alhassid and collaborators was the development of methods to circumvent the sign problem in SMMC calculations for odd-particle-number nuclei, enabling systematic calculations of ground-state energies for isotopic chains of heavy odd-mass nuclei. The group has also developed methods to extract nuclear spectra from SMMC calculations using imaginary-time correlation matrices, and to study nuclear deformation, shape transitions, and collective excitations in heavy nuclei.

=== Mesoscopic physics and quantum dots ===
Alhassid and his collaborators developed a statistical theory of quantum dots that describes the mesoscopic fluctuations of conductance through quantum dots in terms of the underlying signatures of quantum chaos in the single-particle electronic wavefunctions. His comprehensive review article on this subject, published in Reviews of Modern Physics in 2000, drew on tools from semiclassical physics, random matrix theory, and the supersymmetric nonlinear sigma model to describe quantum transport through dots in which the electron dynamics are chaotic or diffusive.

The group also contributed to the theoretical understanding of ultra-small metallic nanoparticles in which conventional BCS theory of superconductivity breaks down, a regime common to both nanoparticles and nuclei despite their energy gaps differing by six orders of magnitude.

=== Cold atomic Fermi gases ===
Alhassid's group has applied auxiliary-field quantum Monte Carlo methods to study ultracold atoms, particularly strongly interacting Fermi gases. These systems serve as clean, experimentally tunable paradigms for strongly correlated quantum matter, with interactions that can be varied from the Bose–Einstein condensate (BEC) regime through the BCS regime to the nonperturbative unitary regime. The group has contributed to understanding the nature of superfluidity in finite-size unitary gases, thermodynamic properties across the BEC–BCS crossover, and the pseudogap regime above the superfluid critical temperature.

=== Earlier work ===
Alhassid's early research, carried out with his doctoral advisor R.D. Levine and later with Franco Iachello at Yale, included work on the information-theoretic approach to nuclear reactions, algebraic models of molecular and nuclear physics, and the study of quantum chaos in nuclear and atomic systems. With R. Balian and H. Reinhardt, he contributed to the theory of dissipation in many-body systems using a geometrical approach based on information theory.

== Awards and honors ==
- Alfred P. Sloan Fellow in Physics (1984–1988)
- Alexander von Humboldt Senior Scientist Award (2001)
- Fellow of the American Physical Society (2001)
- Frederick Phineas Rose Professor of Physics, Yale University (2017)

== Selected publications ==
- Ramachandran, S.; Jensen, S.; Alhassid, Y. (2025). "Precision thermodynamics of the Fermi polaron at strong coupling". Physical Review A. 112 023316. doi:10.1103/PhysRevA.112.023316.
- Alhassid, Y.; Bonett-Matiz, M.; Gilbreth, C.N.; Vartak, S. (2024). "Extracting spectra in the shell model Monte Carlo method using imaginary-time correlation matrices". Physical Review Letters. 133 182501. doi:10.1103/PhysRevLett.133.182501.
- Ramachandran, S.; Jensen, S.; Alhassid, Y. (2024). "Pseudogap effects in the strongly correlated regime of the two-dimensional Fermi gas". Physical Review Letters. 133 143405. doi:10.1103/PhysRevLett.133.143405.
- Jensen, S.; Gilbreth, C.N.; Alhassid, Y. (2020). "Contact in the unitary Fermi gas across the superfluid phase transition". Physical Review Letters. 125 043402. doi:10.1103/PhysRevLett.125.043402.
- Jensen, S.; Gilbreth, C.N.; Alhassid, Y. (2020). "Pairing correlations across the superfluid phase transition in the unitary Fermi gas". Physical Review Letters. 124 090604. doi:10.1103/PhysRevLett.124.090604.
- Mukherjee, A.; Alhassid, Y. (2012). "Odd-particle systems in the shell model Monte Carlo: Circumventing a sign problem". Physical Review Letters. 109 032503. doi:10.1103/PhysRevLett.109.032503.
- Alhassid, Y. (2000). "The statistical theory of quantum dots". Reviews of Modern Physics. 72 (4): 895–968. doi:10.1103/RevModPhys.72.895.
- Alhassid, Y.; Dean, D.J.; Koonin, S.E.; Lang, G.; Ormand, W.E. (1994). "Practical solution to the Monte Carlo sign problem: Realistic calculations of ^{54}Fe". Physical Review Letters. 72 (5): 613. doi:10.1103/PhysRevLett.72.613.
- Balian, R.; Alhassid, Y.; Reinhardt, H. (1986). "Dissipation in many-body systems: A geometrical approach based on information theory". Physics Reports. 131: 1–146. doi:10.1016/0370-1573(86)90005-0.
