= The Dado Center for Interdisciplinary Military Studies =

Israeli military research and training department

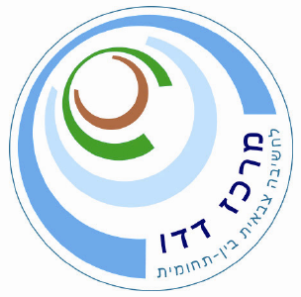
Center's Logo

The Dado Center for Interdisciplinary Military Studies (Hebrew: מרכז דדו לחשיבה צבאית בינתחומית) is a military studies department of the Israel Defense Forces aimed at operational level of war activities.

It was named after rav aluf David "Dado" Elazar.

== History ==
The Dado Center's origins are found in the Operational Theory Research Institute (OTRI, Hebrew abbreviation: MALTAM), a similar organisation that was established in 1995 and dismantled in 2005, following a harsh report by the state comptroller. The following year, in 2006, Brig. Gen. Itai Brun was assigned the task of re-establishing the organisation, which was achieved at the beginning of 2007 under its current title.

Brun served until 2011, when he was replaced by Yoram Hamo in 2011. Hamo was followed by Meir Finkel in 2014 who handed command to Eran Ortal in 2019. In 2023 Ortal was replaced by Tat aluf (Brig. Gen.) Eyal Pecht.

== Areas of activity ==
The Dado Center operates in three primary fields, as:

- A center for learning processes which accompanies the IDF central thinking processes. In this role, it assists in methodology and content top bodies in the IDF General Staff, heads of the regional commands, and the commanders of other top bodies in the IDF as they carry out processes of critical military analysis and development of strategies and tactics.
- A school for the development of senior military leadership in operational thought. In this role, the center prepares senior officers for positions in the IDF General Staff, and runs targeted seminars to groups of officers on learning processes and operational thought, in order to develop new organizational and operational concepts.
- A research institute that employs both civilian and military researchers for data mining and study of various subjects connected to the center's activities.

As part of its activities, the center also runs wargames for senior commanders, joint learning seminars with foreign militaries, and joint day-long seminars between the IDF and academic bodies.

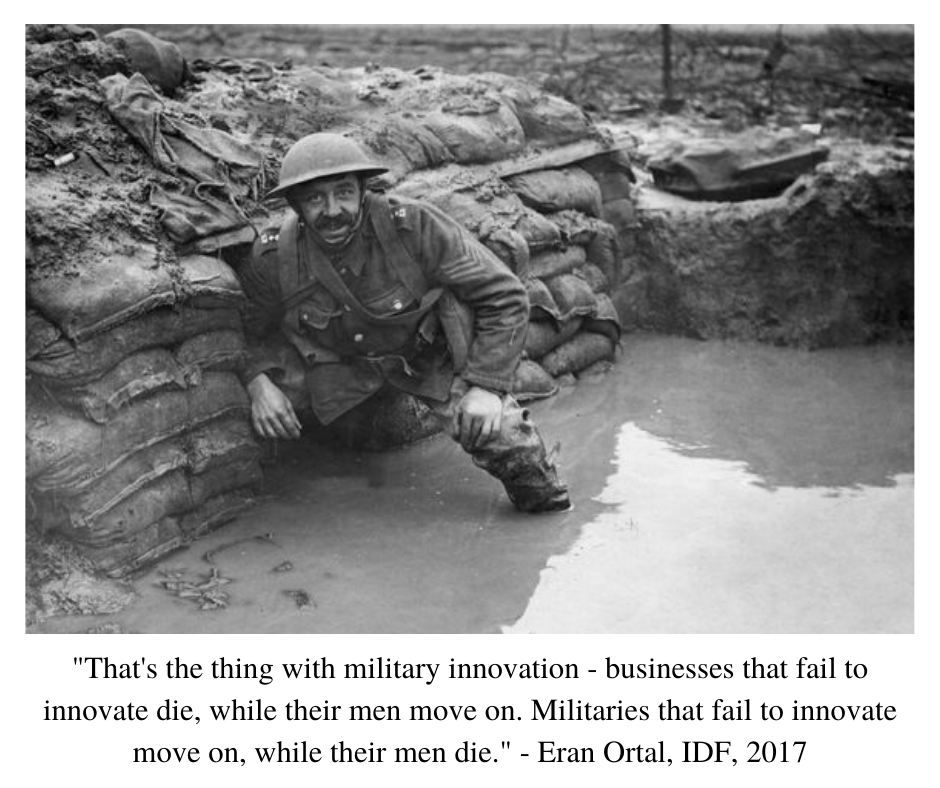
Brig. Gen. Eran Ortal's Quote

== Publications ==
As part of its role of developing learning approaches for the highest ranks in the IDF, the center develops and disseminates a series of internal professional manuals.

Since February 2014, the center publishes a journal named "Bein Haktavim" (Hebrew בין הקטבים), lit. "Between the Poles", which is edited by Brig. Gen. Eran Ortal. The journal seeks to develop IDF's knowledge processes on what's new and developing phenomena. The Dado Center Journal influences the IDF. Each issue of "Bein Haktavim" is dedicated to a different subject.

The journal is published online on the Ma'arachot publishing website, and is distributed to senior IDF commanders, government officials, research institutes, relevant civil organizations, colleges and universities.

== See also ==
- Institute for National Security Studies (Israel)
