= Etel Solingen =

American political scientist

- Born: Argentina
- Occupation: American political scientist

Etel L. Solingen is a Distinguished professor and Thomas T. and Elizabeth C. Tierney Chair in Peace and Conflict Studies at the University of California Irvine. She was President of the International Studies Association (ISA) in 2012–2013 and received the 2018 William and Katherine Estes Award from the National Academy of Sciences; the 2022 Richard Holbrooke Prize from the American Academy in Berlin; the 2020 Susan Strange Professorship at the London School of Economics; and the 2019 Distinguished Scholar award in International Security from the International Studies Association. She has been elected to the American Academy of Arts and Sciences in 2026.

== Bibliography ==
- Scientists and the State: Domestic Structures and the International Context (1994, as editor)
- Industrial Policy, Technology and International Bargaining: Designing Nuclear Industries in Argentina and Brazil (1996)
- Regional Orders at Century's Dawn: Global and Domestic Influences on Grand Strategy (1998)
- Nuclear Logics: Contrasting Paths in East Asia and the Middle East (2007)
- Comparative Regionalism: Economics and Security (2013)
- Geopolitics, Supply Chains, and International Relations in East Asia (edited) (2021)
