= Pınar Keskinocak =

Turkish-American systems engineer

Pınar Keskinocak is a Turkish-American systems engineer at the Georgia Institute of Technology, where she is the William W. George Chair and Professor of Industrial and Systems Engineering, Director of the Center for Health and Humanitarian Systems, and College of Engineering ADVANCE Professor. Her research involves the application of operations research and management science to health care and supply-chain management. She is the former president of INFORMS.

== Education and career ==
Keskinocak earned bachelor's and master's degrees in industrial engineering at Bilkent University in 1991 and 1992, respectively. She completed her Ph.D. at Carnegie Mellon University, with Sridhar Tayur as her doctoral advisor.

After postdoctoral research at the Thomas J. Watson Research Center of IBM, she joined the Georgia Tech faculty in 1999.

== Service ==
Keskinocak is the former president of the Institute for Operations Research and the Management Sciences (INFORMS), for the 2020 term.

She was one of the founding editors of the journal IISE Transactions on Healthcare Systems Engineering (then called IIE Transactions on Healthcare Systems Engineering), serving as department editor for healthcare public policy.

== Recognition ==
Keskinocak is a Fellow of INFORMS, and the winner of the INFORMS Daniel H. Wagner Prize for Excellence in Operations Research Practice. She is the 2021 winner of the WORMS Award for the Advancement of Women in Operations Research and Management Science.
