= Noa Marom =

Israeli materials scientist and computational physicist

- נועה מרום
- Education: Technion – Israel Institute of Technology; Weizmann Institute of Science
- Scientific career
- Fields: Computational Materials Science; Condensed Matter Theory; Quantum Chemistry
- Workplaces: Carnegie Mellon University; Tulane University; University of Texas at Austin
- Website: www.noamarom.com

Noa Marom (Hebrew: נועה מרום) is an Israeli materials scientist and computational physicist at Carnegie Mellon University. She was awarded the International Union of Pure and Applied Physics Young Scientist Prize.

== Early life and education ==
Marom studied materials engineering at Technion – Israel Institute of Technology and earned her bachelor's degree in 2003. After graduating, she worked as an application engineer in the Process and Control Division. She joined the Weizmann Institute of Science for her doctoral studies, earning a PhD under the supervision of Leeor Kronik in 2010. Marom won the Shimon Reich Memorial Prize for her PhD thesis. Her doctoral work considered the predictions of dispersion interactions and electronic structure using computational chemistry. She worked on molecules including copper phthalocyanine, azabenzenes and hexagonal boron nitride.

== Research and career ==
Marom joined the University of Texas at Austin as a postdoctoral researcher in 2010. She moved to Tulane University as an assistant professor in physics in 2013. In 2016 Marom was appointed as an assistant professor at Carnegie Mellon University. She is a member of the Pittsburgh Quantum Institute.

Marom develops genetic algorithms that predict the structure of molecular crystals using the principles of survival of the fittest. Marom's work uses density functional theory and many-body perturbation theory to study complex atomic systems. She has investigated the GW approximation for molecules. The materials investigated by Marom can be used for dye-sensitized solar cells.

=== Awards and honors ===
In 2018 Marom was awarded the International Union of Pure and Applied Physics Young Scientist Prize. She was named as a Fellow of the American Physical Society (APS) in 2025, after a nomination from the APS Division of Computational Physics, "for contributions to computational discovery and design of materials via the development of methods and codes for structure and property prediction of molecular crystals, as well as organic, inorganic, and hybrid interfaces".
