= Eran James =

Australian singer-songwriter

Background information
- Born: Eran Uygun; 27 March 1989 (age 36)
- Origin: Melbourne, Australia
- Genres: Pop, folk, soul, alternative
- Occupation: Singer-songwriter
- Instrument(s): Keyboards, guitar, harmonica
- Years active: 2004–present
- Website: www.eranjames.com

Eran James (born 27 March 1989) is a singer-songwriter from Melbourne. He has released two studio albums that have reached the ARIA top 100.

== Music career ==
James first performed as an eight-year-old. He signed his first record deal as a thirteen-year-old with Universal Music Group. He released his first album, Reviewing The Situation, aged fifteen in 2004. The album included his debut single, a distinctive soul-funk cover of the KC & The Sunshine Band song "I Get Lifted".

Following the successful release of his first album, James attracted the attention of some of the world's leading producers. Moving to New York, he teamed with producer Jay Newland, who co-produced the Norah Jones album Come Away with Me. Working with Newland, James produced his second album, Ten Songs About Love, released on 6 October 2007. It reached No. 43 on the ARIA charts.

James was spotted by Elton John after playing as the opening act on his 2007 Australian Tour. Elton invited Eran to the UK in 2008 and helped him with songwriting and mentoring.

In 2010, through Elton John, Eran was introduced to Grammy Award-winning producer and musician Robin Millar. They began collaborating and writing music, becoming close friends who continue to work together.

James moved back to Melbourne in 2011 and continue playing his music to audiences across Australia. In December 2011 he was the opening act on Elton John's Australian tour.

In December 2011, James released an EP titled, Down the Road.

== Discography ==
=== Albums ===
List of albums with selected details
Title	Details	Peak chart positions
Title	Details	AUS
Reviewing the Situation	Released: September 2004; Label: Heaven, UMA (9823528); Format: CD	65
Ten Songs About Love	Released: October 2007; Label: Heaven, UMA (1723505); Format: CD	43

=== Extended plays ===
List of EPs with selected details
Title	Details
Down the Road	Released: December 2011; Label: Arts Media; Format: DD

=== Singles ===
List of singles as lead artist and chart position
Title	Year	Peak chart positions	Album
Title	Year	AUS	Album
"I'm All Alone"	2005	72	Reviewing the Situation
"I Get Lifted"	2005	–	Reviewing the Situation
"Touched By Love"	2007	–	Ten Songs About Love
"Follow Them Down"	2018	–	non-album single
