= Raphael David Levine =

Israeli chemist (born 1938)

- רפאל לוין
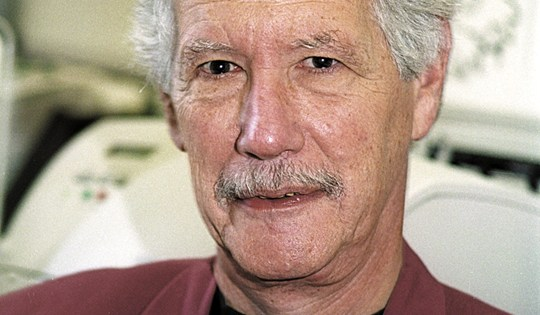
- Levine in 2002
- Born: March 29, 1938 (age 88); Alexandria, Egypt
- Known for: Reaction Dynamics
- Awards: Wolf Prize in Chemistry; Weizmann Prize; Annual Prize of the Academy; Israel Prize; Rothschild Prize; Max Planck Prize for International Cooperation; EMET Prize
- Scientific career
- Fields: Chemistry, Reaction dynamics
- Workplaces: Hebrew University of Jerusalem; University of California, Los Angeles
- Doctoral advisor: Charles Coulson
- Doctoral students: Eran Rabani, Ronnie Kosloff

Raphael David Levine (Hebrew: רפאל לוין; born March 29, 1938) is an Israeli chemist who is a professor at the Hebrew University of Jerusalem, and the Department of Chemistry and Biochemistry, University of California, Los Angeles and the Crump Institute for Molecular Imaging of the David Geffen School of Medicine at UCLA.

== Biography ==
Raphael David Levine was born on March 29, 1938, in Alexandria, Egypt.

== Academic career ==
He is the Max Born professor of Natural Philosophy at the Hebrew University of Jerusalem and a distinguished professor at the University of California, Los Angeles. He is known for his contributions in the modern theory of chemically reactive collisions and unimolecular reactions. He has played a major role in the application of the principles of quantum mechanics to the description of physical change in a reaction from a microscopic point of view, introducing many new concepts and terms which became standard to this area. His major works include the quantum theory of absolute rates, the first quantal treatment of molecular photodissociation, elucidation of the role of resonances in reactive molecular collisions, the theory of collision- induced dissociation, and the foundations of dynamical stereochemistry.

He is a member of Israel Academy of Sciences and Humanities, the Max Planck Society, Academia Europaea, American Academy of Arts & Sciences, American Philosophical Society, Royal Danish Academy of Sciences and Letters, and National Academy of Sciences of the United States.

He has honorary doctorates from Liege University, 1991 and the Technical University of Munich 1996.

His 2005 book, "Molecular Reaction Dynamics", Cambridge University Press, was selected by Choice as 'Outstanding Academic Title 2006'.

== Awards and recognition ==
- 1968: Annual Prize of the Academy.
- 1974: Israel Prize, in exact science.
- 1979: Weizmann Prize.
- 1988: he was awarded the Wolf Prize in Chemistry along with Joshua Jortner of Tel Aviv University "for their incisive theoretical studies elucidating energy acquisition and disposal in molecular systems and mechanisms for dynamical selectivity and specificity".
- 1992: Rothschild Prize.
- 1996: Max Planck Prize for International Cooperation
- 2001: EMET Prize

== See also ==
- List of Israel Prize recipients
