= Eran Neuman =

Israeli architect

- ערן נוימן
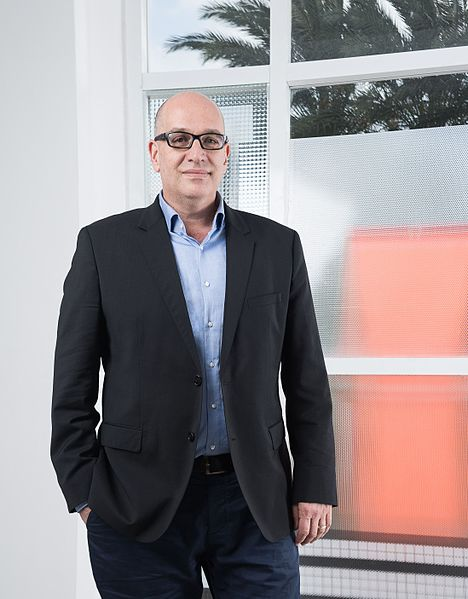
- Born: 1968 (age 57–58); Petah Tikva, Israel
- Education: Bezalel Academy of Art and Design
- Occupation: Architect

Eran Neuman (Hebrew: ערן נוימן; born 1968 in Petah Tikva) is an Israeli architect and architectural historian. Currently, he is the dean of the Yolanda and David Katz Faculty of the Arts, Tel Aviv University. Between 2010 and 2018, Neuman headed the Azrieli School of Architecture at TAU. He is the founder of the Azrieli Architectural Archive at the Tel Aviv Museum of Art and was a co-founder of the international research collaborative Open Source Architecture.

== Biography ==
Neuman holds degrees in architecture from the Bezalel Academy of Art and Design in Jerusalem and an M.A. and Ph.D. from the University of California in Los Angeles. He is recognized for his scholarship in postwar architecture, in particular the exploration of the impact of new technologies on architectural design, practice, and the experience of the built environment, and also on architecture that commemorates the Holocaust. His has contributed in the expansion of topics such as performativity of architecture as well as the relevance of functionalism. Together with Yasha Grobman, he maintained that the "logic of form as an outcome of function was mechanistic" and that reliance in the utility of form will not necessarily address the complexity of form "as a cultural, social, and political product". It was Neuman who introduced the notion of the performative architecture, one positioned in contrast to New Modernism.

Neuman has organized and participated in numerous conferences and seminars at academic institutions internationally, including at Princeton University; Harvard University; University of Toronto; Tongji University, Shanghai; and Monash University, Melbourne; among others.

Under Neuman’s directorship, the Azrieli School of Architecture emerged as one of Israel’s leading architectural schools. At the school, Neuman created programs to foster professional training and scholarship, developed new academic centers and resources, and spearheaded fundraising initiatives. Neuman is also the founder of the Azrieli Architectural Archive at the Tel Aviv Museum of Art. His research initiatives focused on architectural culture in the 20th century.

In 2002, Neuman co-founded the international research collaborative Open Source Architecture (OSA) with Aaron Sprecher and Chandler Ahrens. This international laboratory, which maintains offices in Montreal, Los Angeles, and Tel Aviv, develops a methodology that combines theoretical research with architectural design. The project is based on a collaborative approach and exchange of information across its network similar to a system in software development called "open source".

In 2017, Neuman was appointed director of the Israel Museum.

== Personal life ==
Neumann is openly gay and has been the partner of screenwriter Avner Bernheimer since 1989. They have two sons, and live in Tel Aviv.

== Publications ==
- Neuman, Eran and Grobman, Yasha. Performalism: Form and Performance in Digital Architecture. London: Routledge, 2012.
- Neuman, Eran. The Labyrinth: Ram Karmi and the Extension of Tel Aviv Central Station. Tel Aviv: Tel Aviv University Press, 2013.
- Neuman, Eran. Shoah Presence: Architectural Representations of the Holocaust. London: Routledge, 2014.
- Neuman, Eran. David Yannay: Architecture and Genetics. Tel Aviv Museum of Art press, 2014.
- Neuman, Eran. Arieh Sharon: the Nation's Architect. Tel Aviv Museum of Art press, 2018.

== Curation ==
- In 2018, Neuman curated "Arieh Sharon: the Nation's Architect"
- In 2014, Neuman curated "David Yannay: Architecture and Genetics"
- In 2008, he co-curated "Performalism: Form and Performance in Digital Architecture," both presented at the Tel Aviv Museum
- In 2006, he co-curated “The Gen[H]ome Project,” presented at the MAK Center in Los Angeles

== Honors and awards ==
Neuman has received numerous honors and fellowships including:

- Israel Science Foundation
- The Getty Research Institute, Santa Monica
- Stiftung Zukunft, Berlin
- The Technion, Haifa
- Monash University, Melbourne, Australia
- Tel Aviv University
- University of California, Los Angeles
- Bezalel Academy of Art and Design
- The Keren Sharet America-Israel Culture Foundation; the German-Israel Foundation Fellowship
- The Zuk Fellowship of the American Society of Architectural Historians
- The Center for Advanced Holocaust Studies, Washington, D.C.
