= Eran Viezel =

Israeli biblical scholar

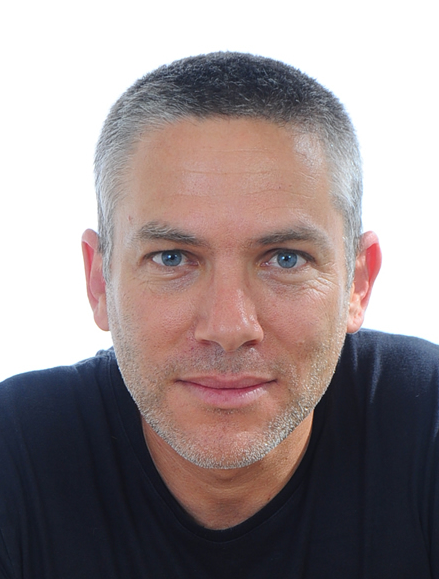
- Born: June 18, 1972 (age 54); Kibbutz Netiv HaLamed-Heh
- Education: Hebrew University of Jerusalem
- Partner: Ella Stern
- Awards: ACUM Prize (2015)
- Scientific career
- Fields: Lecturer, biblical scholar, author, and poet
- Workplaces: Ben-Gurion University of the Negev
- Doctoral advisor: Sara Japhet

Eran Viezel (Hebrew: ערן ויזל; born June 18, 1972) is a full professor at Ben-Gurion University of the Negev, a biblical scholar, and an Israeli author and poet.

== Biography ==
Eran Viezel was born in 1972 in Kibbutz Netiv HaLamed-Heh. He holds a PhD from the Hebrew University of Jerusalem. He is a professor in the Department of Bible Studies, Archeology and the Ancient Near East at Ben-Gurion University of the Negev.

== Research ==
Viezel researches biblical interpretation throughout its history, with an emphasis on rabbinic exegesis, from the exegesis of the Sages (Chazal), through medieval biblical commentary, to biblical scholarship in the period of the Haskalah and in modern times. He also studies composition of biblical books in Jewish tradition throughout the ages.

== Books ==
=== Research Books ===
- The Commentary Attributed to Rashi on the Book of Chronicles (Jerusalem: Magnes, 2010)
- The Intention of the Torah and the Intention of Its Readers: Episodes of Contention (Jerusalem: Magnes, 2021)

=== Poetry and Prose Books ===
- We Have Come Far Thus Far: Poems (Jerusalem: The Bialik Institute, 2012)
- Awaiting a Wolf: Poems (Tel Aviv: Keshev le-Shira, 2016)
- In Praise of Loneliness: A Novel (Tel Aviv: Yedi‘ot Sefarim, 2016)

The Society of Authors, Composers and Music Publishers in Israel Prize (ACUM), 2015

- Darom's File: A Novel (Tel Aviv: Yedi‘ot Sefarim, 2018)
- Introduction to Voxology: A Novel (Tel Aviv: Afarsemon, 2023)

=== Edited Volumes ===
- Eran Viezel, and Sara Japhet (eds.), ‘To Settle the Plain Meaning of the Verse’: Studies in Biblical Exegesis (Jerusalem: The Bialik Institute, 2011)
- Eran Viezel, Naphtali S. Meshel, and Baruch J. Schwartz (eds.), SHNATON: An Annual for Biblical and Ancient Near Eastern Studies, Vol. 26 (Jerusalem: Magnes, 2020); Vol. 27 (Jerusalem: Magnes, 2022); Vol. 28 (Jerusalem: Magnes, 2025).

=== Selected Publications ===
- The Influence of Realia on Biblical Depictions of Childbirth, Vetus Testamentum 61 (2011), pp. 685–689
- Isaac Abravanel's Question and Joseph Hayyun's Answer: A New Stage in the Issue of Moses’ Role in the Composition of the Torah, Religious Studies and Theology 35 (2016), pp. 53–72
- Radical Jewish Study of the Masoretic Text during the Enlightenment Period: Joshua Heschel Schorr, Abraham Krochmal, and Elimelech Bezredḳi, European Journal of Jewish Studies 10 (2016), pp. 50–78
- The Rise and Fall of Jewish Philological Exegesis on the Bible in the Middle Ages: Causes and Effects, Review of Rabbinic Judaism 20 (2017), pp. 48–88
- “The Anxiety of Influence”: The Approach of Rashbam to Rashi's Commentary on the Torah, The Journal of the Association for Jewish Studies [AJS Review] 40 (2016), pp. 279–303
- The Attitude of Modern Scholarship to the Views of Medieval Jewish Exegetes on the Question of the Authorship of the Biblical Books, Revue des études juives 178 (2019), pp. 179–199
- Why Are Jews Forbidden to Eat Meat and Milk Together? The Function of Eating Restrictions in Human Societies, Journal of Theological Studies, 72 (2021), pp. 580–619
- Abraham Ibn Ezra's Account of the Composition of the Torah: A Medieval Precedent for Biblical Criticism?, Jewish Studies Quarterly 30 (2023), pp. 184–205
- “And Who Wrote Them?” (Bava Batra 14b–15a): The List of Biblical Authors, Its Sources, Principles, and Dating, Hebrew Union College Annual 94 (2024), pp. 49–108
