= Eran Kopel =

Israeli epidemiologist

Eran Kopel (Hebrew: ערן קופל) is an Israeli epidemiologist. He is a senior lecturer at Sackler Faculty of Medicine’s School of Public Health and a sub-district health officer at the Petah Tikva office of the Ministry of Health (Israel). His areas of interest are the epidemiology of infectious diseases and cardiovascular epidemiology.

== Early life ==
Kopel received two degrees from the Hebrew University of Jerusalem Faculty of Medicine - Doctor of Medicine (2005) and Bachelor of Medical Sciences (2001). He earned a Masters of Public Health at Tel Aviv University (2012). He studied for an MBA at Ono Academic College.

== Career ==
He was a physician at Western Galilee Hospital.

== Select publications ==
- Kopel, E; Davidovitch, N; Levine, H (2017). "Using All Means to Protect Public Health in Israel From Emerging Tobacco Products". Am J Public Health. 107 (10): 1599–1600. doi:10.2105/AJPH.2017.304016. PMC 5607691. PMID 28902544.
- Kopel, Eran et al. The Israeli public health response to wild polio virus importation.
