= Eran Yashiv =

Israeli economist (born 1959)

- ערן ישיב
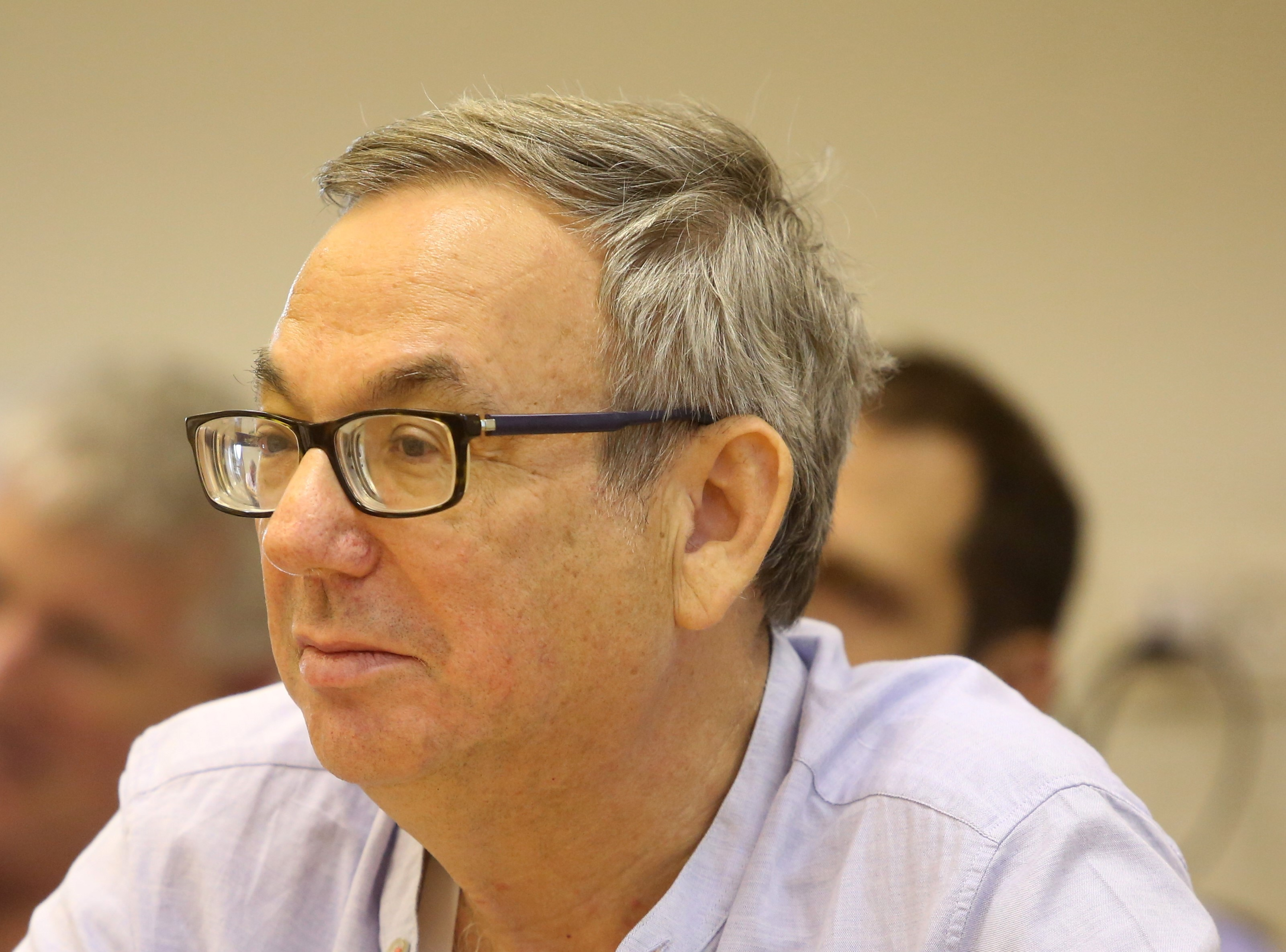
- Yashiv in 2019
- Born: September 5, 1959 (age 67); Israel

Academic background
- Education: Hebrew University of Jerusalem

Academic work
- Institutions: Tel Aviv University

Eran Yashiv (Hebrew: ערן ישיב; born September 5, 1959) is an Israeli economist and policy advisor. His research focuses on topics of macroeconomics, including the labour market and business cycles. More specifically, he is interested in the connections between the value of labour and the value of the firm.

== Early life ==
Eran Yashiv was born in Israel in 1959. He spent his childhood traveling with his family, with his father working for an Israeli airline. His childhood in different countries made him curious about diverse cultures, and especially interested in Eastern religions, philosophy, and arts. In High School he was a reporter for an Israeli youth weekly and active in student reps bodies at the school and at the national level.

== Academic career ==
Eran Yashiv studied Psychology and Economics at the Hebrew University of Jerusalem, and graduated with distinction in 1986. He received his PhD in economics from the Hebrew University in 1992, followed by postdoctorate studies at MIT, under the supervision of Stanley Fischer.

Yashiv is a professor of economics at The Eitan Berglas School of Economics at Tel Aviv University. His work pioneered empirical tests and structural estimation of the canonical framework for the analysis of unemployment, the search and matching model, as best exemplified by his most influential article, The Determinants of Equilibrium Unemployment. Yashiv's work blends theory of the labour market with data on firms and workers. His work informs other parts of macroeconomics, especially tying asset pricing to the labour market.

Within this line of work, in joint work with Renato Faccini (dated 2020), the authors study hiring as a costly activity reflecting firms' investment in their workforce. Because it generates disruption to production, cyclical fluctuations in the value of output, induced by the presence of price rigidities, have consequences for the optimal intertemporal allocation of hiring activities over the cycle. This mechanism generates strong propagation and amplification in the responses to technology shocks, and mutes the traditional transmission of monetary policy shocks. These results—reflecting the confluence of frictions − run counter to conventional arguments, whereby hiring frictions do not matter per se, but only insofar as they engender wage rigidity.

In earlier work, joint with Monika Merz, published in the American Economic Review in 2007, the authors pose the question: what role does labor play in firms' market value? They use a production-based asset pricing model with factor adjustment costs and forward-looking agents to explore this question. They posit that the hiring of labor is akin to investment in capital and that the two interact, with the interaction being a crucial determinant of the dynamic behavior of market value. Using aggregate US corporate sector data, they estimate firms' optimal hiring and investment decisions and the consequences for firms' value. They show that the model can well account for the evolution of stock prices in the U.S.

Yashiv is also interested in the labour market outcomes of Israeli and Palestinian Arabs. With Nitsa (Kaliner) Kasir from The bank of Israel he published a body of work on the (mis)fortunes of this important minority.

In joint work with Gadi Perets, dated 2020, he examines the issue of invariance, which plays a key role in structural models used for policy design and evaluation. Their paper shows how the algebraic method of Lie symmetries of differential equations can derive the full set of conditions for invariance. In doing so, key problems in the formulation of such models are resolved. The authors demonstrate an application of this algebra in a widely used Macro-Finance model and outline a diverse set of models at the research frontier, which would be amenable to similar analysis, thereby providing a road map for a potentially important new literature.

In 2020 he was engaged in work on the COVID-19 with Uri Alon and Ron Milo, systems biologists from the Weizmann Institute of Science, on a proposed COVID-19 lockdown exit strategy. They published a scientific paper and three OpEds to bring it to the attention of policymakers: In the New York Times on May 11, 2020. In the Financial Times on April 21, 2020. In a CEPR forum on April 27, 2020.

Austria will be implementing it in its education system beginning May 18, 2020.

== Positions ==
Yashiv served as chair of the Department of Public Policy at Tel Aviv University (2012-2013), head of the Economics and National Security Program at the INSS (2014-2018), and as a visiting researcher and a consultant to the Bank of Israel (2007-2012) and the Bank of England.

Yashiv is a fellow researcher in leading economics research institutes, such as CfM of the London School of Economics, CEPR, CReAM at University College London, and IZA.

He has been a visiting professor at MIT, NYU Stern School of Business, LSE, UCL, DELTA, Ecole Normale Superieure (Paris), and HEC School of Business (Paris).

== Selected works ==
=== Scholarly articles ===
Title	Author(s)	Publication	Year
The determinants of equilibrium unemployment	E Yashiv	American Economic Review 90	2000
Labor and the market value of the firm	M Merz, E Yashiv	American Economic Review 97	2007
Labor search and matching in macroeconomics	E Yashiv	European Economic Review 51	2007
Evaluating the performance of the search and matching model	E Yashiv	Contributions to Economic Analysis 275	2006
US labor market dynamics revisited	E Yashiv	The Scandinavian Journal of Economics 109	2007
Capital values and job values	E Yashiv	Review of Economic Dynamics 19	

=== Op-eds ===
- "Breaking the taboo: The political economy of COVID-motivated helicopter drops". voxeu.org. Archived from the original on March 28, 2020.
- A Practical Solution to the Crisis in Gaza (Haaretz)
- Israelis Without a Country (Haaretz)
- Dan and Judea: Time to Explore the 'Two States for One People' Solution (Haaretz)
