= Eran Hadas =

Israeli poet

- ערן הדס
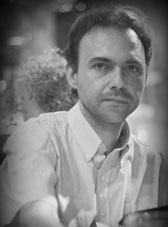
- Website: https://eranhadas.com/english

Eran Hadas (Hebrew: ערן הדס) is an Israeli poet, software developer, new media artist, the author of seven books, and one of the two co-founders of Gnat Micropress. Hadas also creates hypermedia poetry and develops software based poetry generators. Among his collaborative projects is a headset that generates poems from EEG brain waves, and a documentarian robot that interviews people about what it means to be human.

== Career ==
His literacy career started under the female pseudonym of Tzeela Katz who made an impact on Israeli poetry. Hadas stopped using the pseudonym "Tzeela Katz" when she was invited by Israel's national theatre to curate a poetry event series. Her second book, "Era?" got Hadas into the Ten Most Prominent Israeli Poets 2001-2010 Anthology in Haaretz. His fifth book, "The Space Bar", was selected in 2013 as poetry book of the year in Time Out Tel Aviv as well as in Yekum magazine. In 2014, Hadas took part as a poet-performer in "The Lost Paradise" show, which won best show at Acre Theatre Festival. His sixth book, “Code”, which is a software based re-write of the Torah in Haiku Verse, got the Tel Aviv Foundation For The Arts Grant for adaptation of a book, and was composed by Dganit Elyakim as a nine-hour concert which debuted in Hateiva, Jaffa, in 2015.

Hadas’ computational poetry projects have been featured in The Israel Museum, Tel Aviv Museum of art, Bloomfield Science Museum, as well as international festivals such as Text Festival, UK, Paraflows and Ars Electronica, Austria, and AIOP, NY. Hadas is a lecturer at the Midrasha, Greater Tel Aviv and the College of the Literary Arts in Jerusalem. He is the 2016 poet-in-residence at Binyamin Gallery, Tel Aviv, and the 2017 Schusterman Visiting Artist at Caltech. He was interviewed in 2020 for the Shaping Business Minds Through Art podcast.

== Books ==
- "Heavy Meta" (as Tzeela Katz, Self/Mendele 2009)
- "Era?" (as Tzeela Katz, Self/Mendele 2010)
- "People You May Know" (Plonit, 2011)
- "Center" (Online, 2012)
- "The Space Bar" (Maayan, 2013)
- "Code” (Pardes, 2015)
- "Testimony" (Gnat Micropress, 2016)
