= Eran Prion =

Israeli musical artist

Eran Prion ערן פריאון
- Born: April 18, 1974 (age 51)
- Origin: Tel Aviv, Israel
- Genres: Hip hop, electronica, alternative, classical, tv scores and theme music
- Occupations: Musician, TV composer, producer, songwriter
- Instruments: Guitar, keyboard, bass, drum machine
- Years active: 1996–present
- Website: prion-music.com

Eran Prion (Hebrew: ערן פריאון; born April 18, 1974), professionally known as Prayon, is an Israeli musician and music producer based in Tel Aviv and New York. He has composed scores and theme music for many TV shows, most notably ABC's Rising Star.

Prion was born in Tel Aviv and played in a number of bands during the 90's, most notably Hayevaniya releasing the hit song Hayevaniya hagdola in 1996. thereafter founding in 2006 the Israeli-based Prion Music, specializing in composing music scores mainly for television shows.

As a music producer, Prion has written and produced scores for many of the leading prime time TV shows in Israel, including "Big Brother", "Eretz Nehederet", "Raid the Cage", "BOOM!" and others. He has also worked on soundtracks for movies such as Charlie Wilson's War, and a number of international and United States television shows such as Without a Trace (CBS), Make It or Break It (ABC), The Hills (MTV), Rising Star (ABC), NCIS (CBS) and others.

== Musical career ==
Prion was born and raised in Tel Aviv, Israel. At the age of 16 he formed the punk metal band "Scaffold", having a debut release in 1991. In 1995 after serving in the Israeli Army, he went on to form the band "Hayevaniya" (the Greek) releasing a year later their lead single "Hayevaniya Hagdola" which had reached the number one spot in the Israeli music charts for a number of weeks, reaching number 30 in the Israeli Annual Hebrew Song Chart of 1997.

In 1999, Prion moved to the United States and begun producing records for local Hip-Hop artists, sharing a studio with producer RedOne. This collaboration led among other things to producing the single "Fredrik snortare & Cecilia Synd" by the Swedish artist Petter (reaching 11th place in the SWE charts). In these years Prion worked with a number of Pop and Hip-Hop musicians including Sean Paul, Beyoncé, Mobb Deep, Empire ISIS, G-UNIT, Pitbull and Beenie Man. During 2004, he started working with the New York-based 'Soundtrack' studio, producing and writing TV and Movie scores on a number of projects.

After having worked on a number of soundtracks and scores, in 2006 Prion returned to Israel and set up his own production company "Prion Music". The company headed by Prion had produced and written a large number of musical scores for television commercials; including for Levi's, Bratz, Motorola, Citroën, and a number of Israeli companies namely Tnuva, Strauss and Teva Pharmaceutical Industries. Also in recent years the company wrote and produced musical scores for television shows mostly Israeli, and mostly prime time family entertainment shows. Among these is the show Rising Star (HaKokhav HaBa in Israel), The USA version of which aired on ABC in the summer of 2014 including music produced by Prion. The studio has also produced the score music for the international game show Who's Still Standing? producing for 6 of the versions (Germany, Spain, Turkey, Hungary, Israel and Brazil; around 1,800 episodes up to date). Major Israeli musical projects include Eretz Nehederet, the Israeli version of Big Brother, Boom! and Raid the Cage. International projects include shows such as Without a Trace (CBS), Make It or Break It (ABC), The Hills (MTV), NCIS (CBS) and others.

== Selected television and movie credits ==
=== Featured music ===
- NCIS (2013), CBS.
- Make It or Break It (2012, 2009), ABC.
- Without a Trace (2011), CBS.
- Khloé & Lamar (2011), E!.
- Notes from the Underbelly (2008), Warner Bros. Television.
- The Hills (2008), MTV.
- Welcome to The Captain (2008), CBS Paramount.
- Charlie Wilson's War (2007), Universal Studios.

=== Original scores and theme music ===
Title	Genre	Country	Year
Rising Star	Music reality	USA	2014
HaKokhav HaBa (Rising Star)	Music reality	Israel	2013
Rising Star	Music reality	Portugal	2014
Superstar	Music reality	Brazil	2014
Big Brother	Reality/Drama	Israel	2008–2014 7 seasons
Eretz Nehederet	Comedy	Israel	2011–2014 3 seasons
Boom!	Game show	Israel	2014
Lauf al ha milion	Game show	Israel	2011–2014 4 seasons
Ahora Caigo	Game show	Spain	2011–2014 3 seasons
Maradj Talpon	Game show	Hungary	2011–2013 2 seasons
Quem Fica Em Pe	Game show	Brazil	2012–2014 3 seasons
Eyvah Düşüyorum	Game show	Turkey	2012–2014 2 seasons
Abdurch die Mitte	Game show	Germany	2012
The Money Pump	Game show	Israel	2012
Raid the Cage	Game show	Israel	2013–2014 3 seasons
Nireh Otcha	Game show	Israel	2010 2 seasons
Sansli Masa	Game show	Turkey	2011–2014 2 seasons
Plaka Kaneis	Game show	Greece	2011
Issoder Quizz	Game show	Germany	2011
Deterlǿgen	Game show	Denmark	2011
Faḉa e Disfarḉa	Game show	Brazil	2012–2014 3 seasons
