= Journal of Chinese Political Science =

- Discipline: Political science
- Language: English
- Edited by: Sujian Guo

Publication details
- History: Since 1995
- Publisher: Springer Science+Business Media on behalf of the Association of Chinese Political Studies
- Frequency: Quarterly
- Open access: Hybrid
- Impact factor: 5.4 (2025)

Standard abbreviations
- ISO 4: J. Chin. Polit. Sci.

Indexing
- ISSN: 1080-6954 (print); 1874-6357 (web)
- LCCN: 95646203
- OCLC no.: 1057915584

Links
- Journal homepage; Online archive

Journal of Chinese Political Science
- Traditional Chinese: 中國政治學刊
- Simplified Chinese: 中国政治学刊
Transcriptions
Standard Mandarin
- Hanyu Pinyin: Zhōngguó Zhèngzhì Xuékān

The Journal of Chinese Political Science is a quarterly peer-reviewed hybrid open-access academic journal published by Springer Science+Business Media on behalf of the Association of Chinese Political Studies, covering theoretical and empirical research articles on Chinese politics across the whole spectrum of political science. Its editor-in-chief is Sujian Guo (San Francisco State University).

== Abstracting and indexing ==
The journal is abstracted and indexed in:

- Current Contents/Social and Behavioral Sciences
- EBSCO databases
- International Bibliography of Periodical Literature
- Index Islamicus
- ProQuest databases
- Scopus
- Social Sciences Citation Index

According to the Journal Citation Reports, the journal has a 2025 impact factor of 5.4.

== See also ==
- The Chinese Journal of International Politics
