= Eran Ortal =

Israeli general (born 1971)

- ערן אורטל
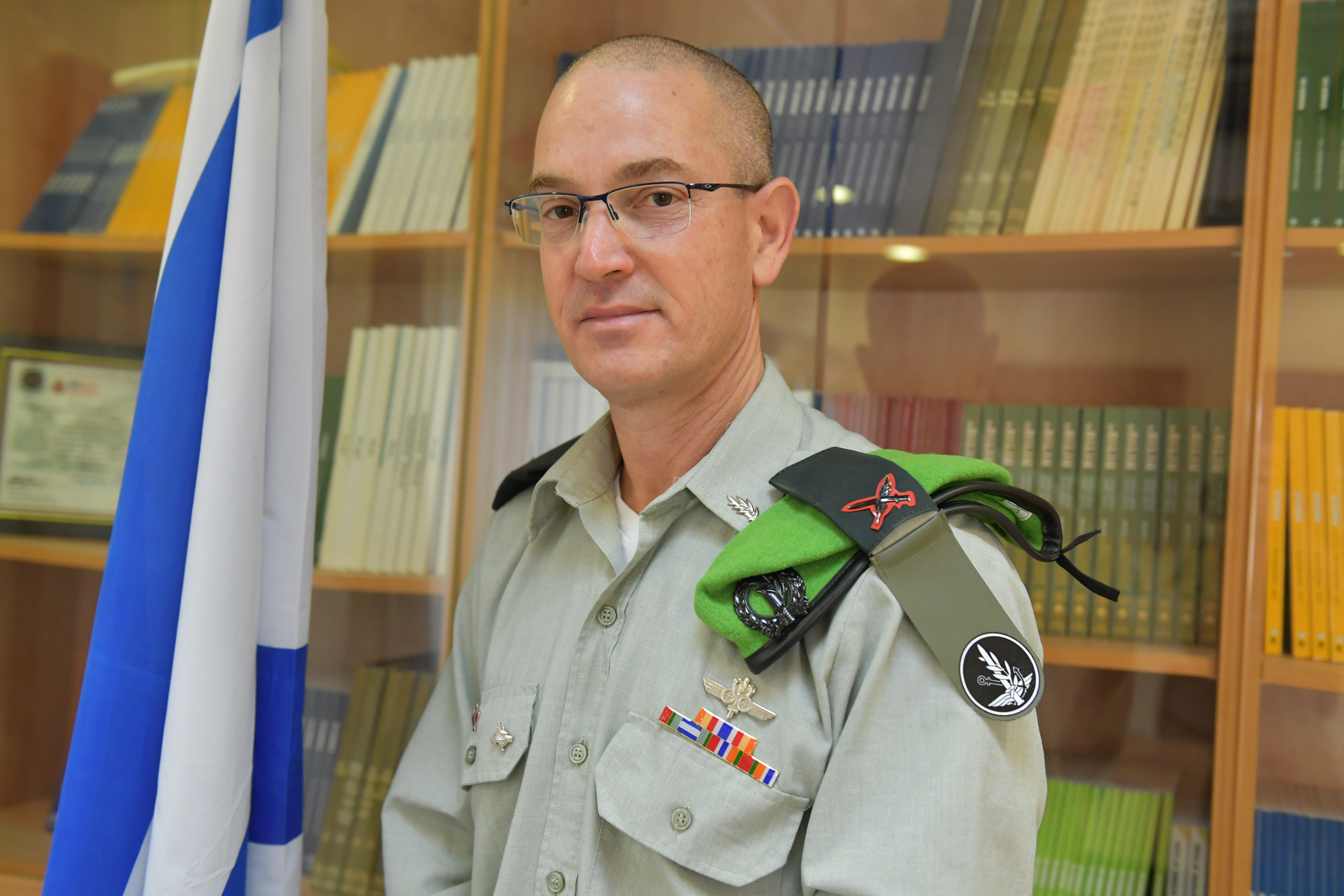
- Brig. Gen. Eran Ortal
- Born: October 22, 1971 (age 54); Bat Yam, Israel
- Military career
- Allegiance: Israel
- Branch: Israel Defense Forces
- Service years: 1989–1993, 1999-2023
- Rank: Tat aluf - Brigadier General
- Unit: Operations Directorate
- Commands: The Dado Center for Interdisciplinary Military Studies; Military Intelligence Directorate
- Conflicts: South Lebanon conflict (1985–2000); First Intifada; Second Intifada; 2006 Lebanon War; Operation Cast Lead; Operation Pillar of Defense; Operation Protective Edge

Eran Ortal (Hebrew: ערן אורטל; born 22 October 1971) is an Israeli brigadier-general (Res) and military theorist, served as the commander of The Dado Center for Interdisciplinary Military Studies. Ortal is also the founder and editor of the Israel Defense Force Dado Center journal named "Bein Ha-ktavim" (Hebrew: בין הקטבים, "In between the Poles").

== Biography ==
Ortal was born in Bat Yam, Israel. He was drafted into the IDF Nahal Brigade in 1989, and served in southern Lebanon and the west Bank in the Combat Intelligence Collection Corps. In 1993, he completed his active service and studied history and political science, He then did a master's degree in security studies at TAU.

In 1999, Ortal returned to the IDF as an operations researcher in the Planning Branch/J5 of the IDF General Staff. In 2004, he transferred to the Operations Division, where he served in a variety of positions in operational planning. Ortal attended the IDF brigade commanders course in 2012, and the next year began studying in the Israel National Security College while also serving as a research fellow. In 2013, Ortal was promoted to the rank of colonel and became the Dado Center's deputy commander and head of think tank. He was promoted to brigadier-general in 2019 and replaced BG Dr. Meir Finkel as commander of the Dado Center. Retired from the IDF at the end of 2023, Ortal advises on strategy military and technology, teaches at Raichman University and is a senior fellow and participant in think tanks like BESA Israel and the Hoover Institution. His first book "The Battle Before The War" (Modan 2022 Hebrew) published in 2025 is the 2025 second place winner of the Chechik award for being "Impressive and of world-class quality in its analysis of contemporary battlefield trends" (...) “The book analyzes prior to the current war the crisis in Israel’s security doctrine“ (...) "The book demonstrates an exceptionally high level in its treatment of historical cases of technological revolutions around the world and their connection to the current case".

== Scholarship ==
Ortal's published work focuses on operational planning and IDF force design at the general staff level. He is regarded as prominent self-critical voice within the IDF, challenging core beliefs and methods at the operational and strategic levels within the organization. He advocates an operational art approach, and founded the Dado Center Journal that features senior officers examining and critiquing IDF strategy, force employment, and force design.

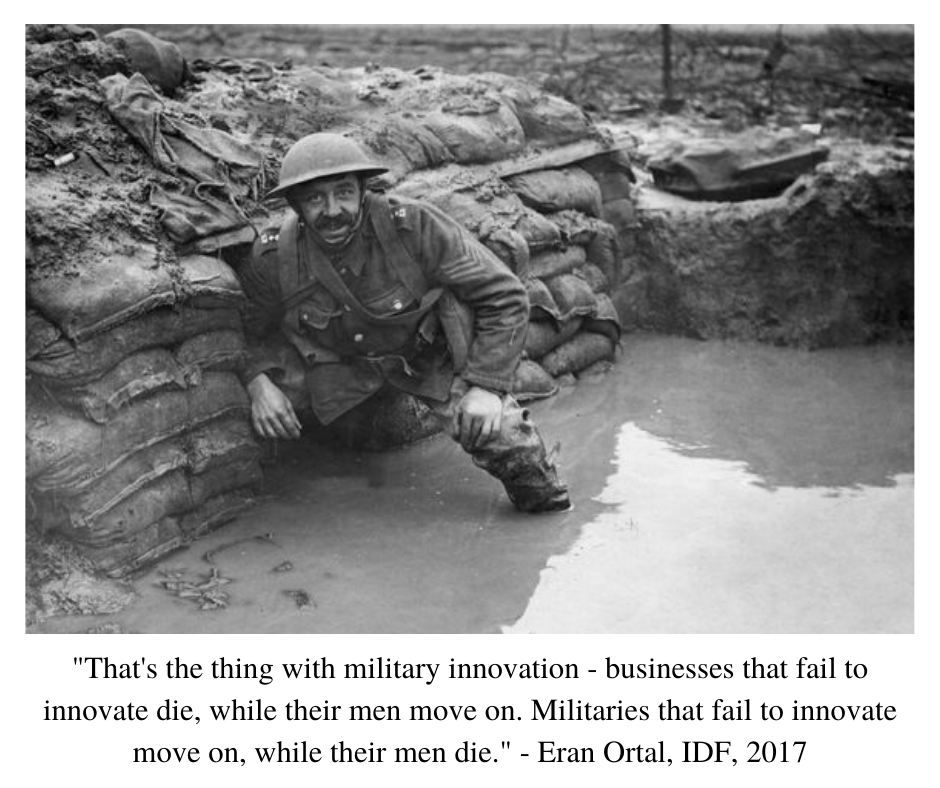
Brig. Gen. Eran Ortal's Quote

Ortal, along with Gen. Tamir Yadai, argued that since Operation Accountability in 1993, the IDF has pursued a de facto doctrine they call the "deterrence operations paradigm." They wrote that the reasons for the emergence of this paradigm are the rise of stand-off fires capabilities, a perceived reduction in the relevance of the battlefield victory idea, and a parallel rise in the belief of the coercion and punishment approach against state actors. Ortal and Yadai claim that this paradigm has been shown to be a failure that does not achieve its aims. They propose a conceptual and practical framework to restore the battlefield victory approach in the IDF. During the Gaza war Ortal has published works about the lessons learned and the coming war in Lebanon. In some interviews he spoke of the defense principles needed for Gaza after the war and the Israeli defense strategy broader principals.

In recent years, the two officers have adapted their approach to deal with the challenge of "missile-based terror armies", like Hezbollah and Hamas. In a series of articles, Ortal stressed the strategic significance of the rocket threat on Israel, and the imperative of developing a new offensive approach to defeat the new threat. Gen. Aharon Haliva, head of the IDF Operations Directorate during Operation Guardian of the Walls in May 2021, published an article in DCJ calling for the "Extinguish of the fire" approach that Ortal advocated, as a means of stopping the adversary's fires offensive across the border and taking away his ability to pursue a campaign against Israel. Ortal has also analyzed core issues the IDF has dealt with in recent years, including ground maneuver, subterranean threats, the rocket threat, and the IDF's learning and transformation system. In a Res Militaris article called "Israel's Strategic Border Challenge – The Growth of the Tunnel Threat under the Cover of Rockets," Ortal highlighted the connection between rockets in Gaza and the freedom to dig Hamas has enjoyed since 2014.

His critique of the IDF's General Staff force design system and strategic learning system led to practical changes in the IDF, many of which are reflected in Chief of Staff Aviv Kochavi's Momentum Multi-Year Plan. Some of these reforms include the creation of the Shiloach Division, and the division of the Planning Directorate into two branches, one that deals with force design and the other that deals with strategy and Iran. Ortal's work is also reflected in IDF's Operational Concept for Victory.

Ortal played a central role in strategic thought processes in the Military Intelligence Directorate (Ma’aseh Aman) and in the Ground Forces (Land Ahead). Both processes describe a critical evaluation of the performance of these arrays in light of change, and offer a solution based on the potential in the changing world, especially in technological development. In both cases, Ortal looks at both processes several years later and asks why the desired change did not occur to the extent desired. a decade after, MG Yadai and BG Ortal published a new call for change in IDF's concept. In "Decentralizing the Israel Defense Forces" they Call for the building of a modernized more anti-fires capable ground forces that will enable the IDF to be decisive at war in Lebanon and Gaza and at the same time allow the IAF and other IDF long range capabilities to be better focused on Iran. That work refers to Ortal's critic of aspects of the Israeli strategy vis-a-vis Iran. Times of Israel's Lazar berman wrote that "The fact that Ortal and Yadai, both now generals, are in 2023 still calling in print for the change to occur is a sign that they still see plenty of reason to worry". Ortal is also Known for his concerns regarding IDF's defensive posture prior to the Oct 7 attack by Hamas on Israel.

Ortal has also been involved in digitization and turning the world of networks into a combat paradigm that takes advantage of the fourth industrial revolution. He dealt with these subjects in his work on Ma’aseh Aman and Land Ahead.

Ortal's latest theoretical framework for the military change needed was published at the Hoover Institution in Stanford. In that publication "Fighting Fires With Data" he also referred to the war in Ukraine as yet another evidence to the dangers of the evolving nature of war as war of attrition to the world order.

Ortal is also known as a critic of Israel's defense approach on the borders. His latest warning on that issue was published just 7 months before Hamas attack of October 7, 2023

== Published books ==
- Eran Ortal, the Battle The before War: The Inside Story of the IDF's Transformation, (Hebrew) Israel Ministry of Defense Publishing House and The Dado Center for Interdisciplinary Military Studies, 2022

== More English Publications ==
- Brigadier General Eran Ortal Biography at The Dado Center English website.
- Ortal, TURN ON THE LIGHT, EXTINGUISH THE FIRE: ISRAEL’S NEW WAY OF WAR, War on The Rocks · Jan 19, 2022
- Ortal, Going on the Attack: The Theoretical Foundation of the Israel Defense Forces’ Momentum Plan, the Jerusalem strategic tribune · Mar 22, 2022/
- Lazar Berman, ‘Time is not on our side’: Retiring IDF general calls for urgent army overhaul, The Times of Israel, 15 February 2023.
- https://resmilitaris.net/wp-content/uploads/2021/10/res_militaris_article_ortal_israel_strategic_border_challenge.pdf
- Israeli Military Thinking: Insights and Analysis, Centre on Radicalisation & Terrorism (CRT), March 8, 2023.
- Lazar Berman, After years of dead-end air campaigns, pinpoint use of ground forces may offer way out, Times of Israel, 17 May 2023.
- Ortal, Fighting fires with data, Hoover institution Stanford · Aug 8, 2023 https://www.hoover.org/research/fighting-fires-data
- Ortal. Wearing Out The Iranian Tiger, Hoover institution. Stanford · Aug 9, 2023 https://www.hoover.org/research/wearing-out-iranian-tiger
- Ortal, Hoover Institution, Stanford, Decentralizing the Israel Defense Forces, November 2023
- Ortal& others, Manoeuvre or Defence? Israeli Experiences of Responding to Missile Threats, RUSI, Oct 2023
- Ortal & others, Integrating Offence and Defence: Lessons from the Israeli Experience, RUSI, Oct 2023
- Eran Ortal, The War of October 7 – and the One to Follow, THE BEGIN-SADAT CENTER FOR STRATEGIC STUDIES BAR-ILAN UNIVERSITY Mideast Security and Policy Studies No. 204, Feb 2024
- Eran Ortal, Israel's first total war, Hoover Institution. April 202 4
- Ortal, Reconstruction of Gaza Is the Way to Regain Initiative in the Iron Swords War, BESA, May 2024
- Ortal, A Sustainable Strategy: Principles for Updating Israel's Strategy and Security Concept, BESA. July 2024
- Ortal, War in the North, the Defense Budget, and Strategy, BESA July 2024
- Ortal, How to Win the Thirty Years’ War with Iran, BESA July 2024
- Ortal, It's Not a Border. It's a Front, BESA. August 2024
- Ortal, The Secret War Behind the Exchanges of Fire in the North, BESA, August 2024
- Ortal, To Defend Israel, Rearrange the Sky, BESA Aug 2024
- Ortal, Hezbollah Must Be Fought Like a State Army, Not Like a Terrorist Organization, Begin Sadat center Bar Ilan University · Sep 26, 2024.
- Ortal, Bleak October, Hoover Digest, Hoover Institution, Stanford University, Oct 9, 2024
- Ortal, Rapid capability advancement can enable Israel to decisively defeat Hizbullah and break its strategic stalemate, Janes October 2024
- Ortal, Hezbollah Must Be Fought Like a State Army, Not Like a Terrorist Organization, BESA, Sept 26, 2024
- Ortal, The IDF's Gamble in Lebanon, BESA, Oct 2024.
- Ortal, Levy's Anti-IDF Argument Shows a Loss of Moral Direction, BESA, Nov, 2024
- Ortal, The October 7 War Is Only the First Act, BESA - Begin Sadat Center for Strategic Studies Feb 12 2025.
- Ortal, After Iran, the Houthis Should Be Enemy No. 1, National interest, Jul 15 2025.
- Ortal, Operation Rising Lion a military perspective, BESA center and the Jerusalem Post, Oct 16 2025.
- Ortal, After the Gaza War, Israel Faces a New Region, The National Interest · Dec 2, 2025.
