= Eran Rabani =

Israeli theoretical chemist

- ערן רבני
- Born: April 17, 1967 (age 59); Jerusalem, Israel
- Education: Hebrew University of Jerusalem
- Known for: Theory of nanomaterials Stochastic density functional theory
- Scientific career
- Workplaces: Hebrew University of Jerusalem University of California, Berkeley Tel Aviv University
- Thesis: Dynamics and Kinetics of Molecular Rydberg States: A Dynamic and Dissipative Approach
- Doctoral advisor: Raphael David Levine
- Website: http://www.cchem.berkeley.edu/ergrp/

Eran Rabani (Hebrew: ערן רבני) is an Israeli theoretical chemist. He is a professor of theoretical chemistry and applied physics at the Hebrew University of Jerusalem. Previously, he held the Glenn T. Seaborg Chair in Physical Chemistry at the University of California, Berkeley and was a professor of chemistry at Tel Aviv University, where he also served as director of the Sackler Center for Computational Molecular and Materials Science.

== Education ==
Rabani received his B.Sc. in chemistry from the Hebrew University of Jerusalem in 1991. Under the supervision of Raphael David Levine, Rabani studied molecular Rydberg states, completing his PhD. in 1996. Having completed his post-doctoral fellowship at Columbia University in 1999 he joined the faculty of the School of Chemistry at the Tel Aviv University.

== Career ==
Rabani's interest in the theory of nanomaterials rose during his post-doctoral stay in the group of Bruce J. Berne at Columbia University, studying the electronic properties of cadmium selenide nanocrystals. This work included the first application of the filter-diagonalization method for the study of electronic structure, as well as the first quantitative study interactions between nanocrystals. Later early work in Rabani's independent career included further the study of the latter, the highlight of which is the theoretical study of drying-induced self-assembly of nanocrystals.

Starting in 2012, Rabani has been working extensively with Roi Baer (Hebrew University of Jerusalem) and Daniel Neuhauser (University of California, Los Angeles) on applying stochastic methods for the study of the electronic structure of large systems, such as nanocrystals, including stochastic formulations of the random-phase approximation, second order Møller–Plesset perturbation theory and density functional theory. Such methods have allowed the calculation of GW self-energies of 10,000 electrons-large systems with linear scaling.

Rabani became a full professor at Tel Aviv University in 2008. In 2014 he joined the faculty of the department of chemistry at University of California, Berkeley and later the faculty of the Lawrence Berkeley National Laboratory in 2015. Rabani has held various positions, including serving as the Vice President for Research and Development at Tel Aviv University and director of The Sackler Center for Computational Molecular and Materials Science. In 2015, Rabani joined the editorial board of the American Chemical Society journal Nano Letters as an associate editor, a position he held until 2021. In 2026, Rabani moved to the Hebrew University of Jerusalem, joining the Institute of Applied Physics and the Department of Chemistry.

Rabani has an h-index of 62 as of 2026, having published more than 230 papers which were cited more than 13000 times. Among his doctoral students throughout the years is Oded Hod, a faculty member at Tel Aviv University.

== Awards ==
- Visiting Miller Research Professorship, University of California, Berkeley 2010
- Marie Curie IOF, 2010 - 2013
- J.T. Oden Faculty Fellow, University of Texas, Austin 2009
- Invited Professorship, Ecole Normale Superieure, Paris 2008 - 2009
- The Michael Bruno memorial award, Yad Hanadiv, 2006
- ICS Prize for Excellent Young Chemists, Israel Chemical Society, 2003
- The Friedenberg Foundation Award, Israel Science Foundation, 2002
- The Bergmann Memorial Research Award, United States-Israel Binational Science Foundation, 2000
- The Yigal Alon Fellowship, The Israeli Council of Higher Education, 1999 - 2002
- The Fulbright Postdoctoral Fellowship, 1997
- The Rothschild Postdoctoral Fellowship, Yad Hanadiv, 1996

== Community activity ==
Rabani served as a council member and the vice mayor of Har Adar, an Israeli settlement, between the years 2008–2010.
