= New Iran Party =

New Iran Party is a translation used for the name of two distinct political parties in Iran:

- Iran-e-No Party (1927)
- Iran Novin Party (1963–1975)
