= Iran (given name) =

Iran is a unisex given name. Notable people with the name include:

== Female ==
- Iran Darroudi (1936–2021), Iranian artist
- Irán Castillo (born 1977), Mexican actress and singer
- Irán Eory (1939–2002), Spanish actress

== Male ==
- Iran Barkley (born 1960), American retired professional boxer
- Iran Andrielle de Oliveira (born 1979), Brazilian football player
- Iran Sidny Freitas de Almeida (born 1995), Brazilian football player
