= Eran Elinav =

Israeli immunologist

- ערן אלינב
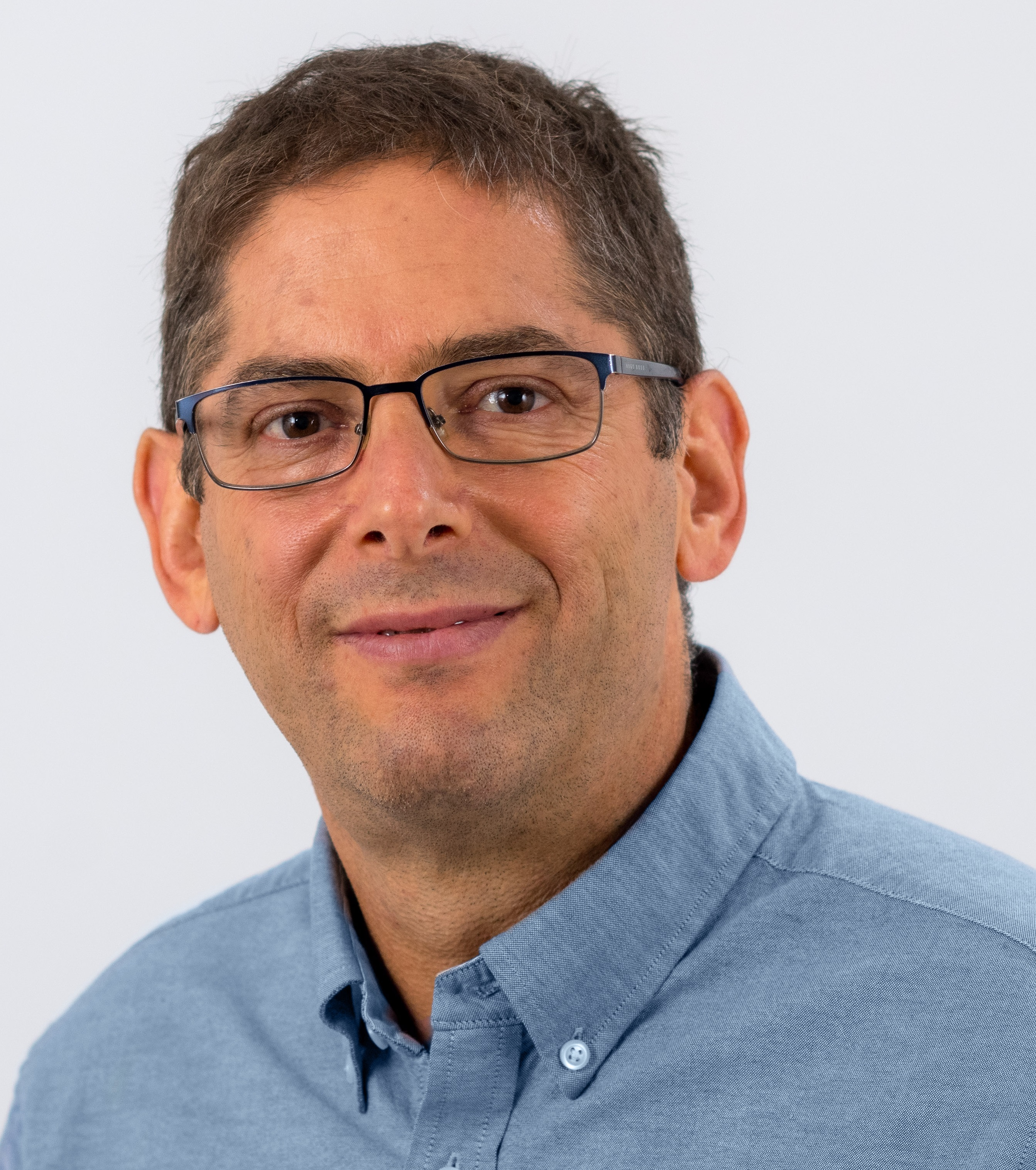
- Eran Elinav
- Born: June 22, 1969; Jerusalem
- Citizenship: Israeli
- Education: Hebrew University in Jerusalem, Hadassah-Hebrew University Medical Center, Weizmann Institute of Science
- Organization(s): Weizmann Institute of Science, German Cancer Research Center
- Spouse: Hila
- Children: Shira, Omri, Inbal
- Awards: Rappaport prize for biomedical research, Levinson award for basic science research, Landau prize of Immunology, The EFSD and the Novo Nordisk Foundation Precision Diabetes Medicine Award
- Website: www.weizmann.ac.il/immunology/elinav/

Eran Elinav (Hebrew: ערן אלינב; born 22 June 1969 in Jerusalem, Israel) is an Israeli immunologist and microbiota researcher at the Weizmann Institute of Science and the German Cancer Research Center. He is an international scholar at the Howard Hughes Medical Institute and the Bill & Melinda Gates Foundation, a senior fellow of the Canadian Institute for Advanced Research, and a partner at Novo Nordisk Foundation Microbiome Health Initiative.

== Academic and medical career ==
Elinav earned a M.D. from the Hebrew University in Jerusalem in 1999. Following an internship and residency in internal medicine at the Hadassah-Hebrew University Medical Center in 2000–2004.

He served as a senior physician-scientist at the Tel Aviv Sourasky Medical Center Institute of Gastroenterology and Liver Disease in 2005–2009.

In 2009 Elinav earned a Ph.D. in immunology from the Weizmann Institute of Science, advised by Zelig Eshhar, after developing the Chimeric Antigen Receptor Regulatory T cell (CAR-Treg) approach, as treatment of inflammatory bowel disease and autoimmunity. In 2009-2012 he followed by a post-doc at Yale University, advised by Richard Anthony Flavell, in which he discovered the NLRP6 inflammasome.

In 2012 Elinav moved to the Weizmann Institute of Science and in 2016 was made a professor. He heads the Institute of Microbiome research and the Center of Host-Pathogen Interaction Research at the Weizmann Institute of Science and the Microbiome & Cancer Division at the German Cancer Research Center. He is the head of the Department of Systems Immunology at the Weizmann Institute of Science.

== Research ==
Elinav studies the molecular basis of host-microbiota interactions, and the effects of diet, environmental factors, immune function and host genetics on the intestinal microbiome and associated multi-factorial metabolic, inflammatory, malignant and neurogenerative disease. His most-cited papers have more than 2,000 cites each.

Elinav developed precision microbiota interventions, including personalized nutrition, precision probiotics, small molecule ″postbiotics″, phage therapy, autologous fecal microbiome transplantation, vaginal microbiome transplantation and gut epithelial interventions.

=== Personalized Nutrition ===
In 2014 Elinav discovered that people consuming identical foods and additives, such as non-nutritive sweeteners, general foods and bread, feature a unique and personalized glycemic response, thereby potentially explaining the lack of uniform metabolic responses to generalized dietary approaches. Personalized dietary recommendations, based on individualized dietary, clinical and microbiota data, improved pre-diabetes control. He similarly showed, that consumption of probiotics leads to a person-specific colonization resistance and physiological patterns.

=== Nutritional timing and the Microbiota ===
Elinav discovered, that the gut microbiota features a compositional and functional diurnal activity during a 24-hour cycle, which is dictated by host and environmental factors, mainly by the timing in food consumption. These microbiota diurnal activities are tightly coordinated with the host gastrointestinal and systemic circadian activity, while disruption of circadian activity by jet-lag or shift work may lead to alterations in the microbiota behavior, which contribute to the development of common metabolic, immune and liver diseases.

== Awards and recognition ==
Elinav was awarded the Rappaport prize for biomedical research in 2015, the Levinson award for basic science research in 2016, the Landau prize of Immunology in 2018 and The EFSD and the Novo Nordisk Foundation Precision Diabetes Medicine Award in 2023. Elinav was inducted into the European Molecular Biology Organization (EMBO) in 2017, the American Academy of Microbiology in 2021, the German National Academy of Sciences Leopoldina and The European Academy for Cancer Sciences in 2025.
