= Pittsburgh Quantum Institute =

Coordinates: 40°26′40″N 79°57′12″W

- Former names: Pitt Quantum Initiative (2012–2013)
- Established: 2012
- Director: Dr. Michael Hatridge and Dr. Benjamin Hunt
- Location: Pittsburgh, Pennsylvania, U.S.
- Website: www.pqi.org
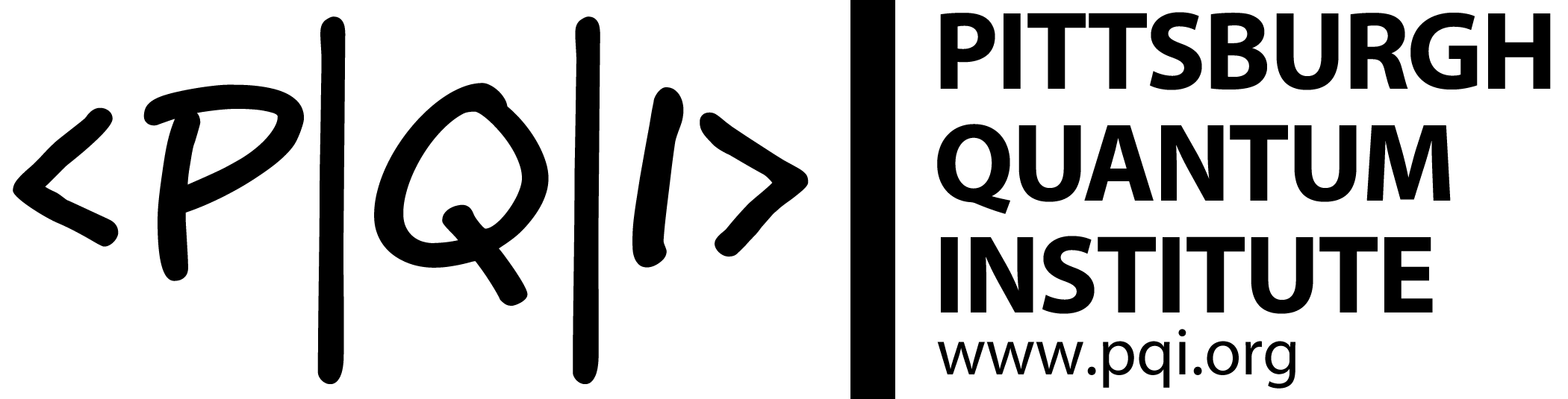

The Pittsburgh Quantum Institute (PQI) is a multidisciplinary research institute that focuses on quantum sciences and engineering in the Pittsburgh region. It is a research-intensive cluster.

The Pittsburgh Quantum Institute (PQI) was founded in 2012 with the mission “to help unify and promote quantum science and engineering in Pittsburgh”. With financial support from the Dietrich School of Arts and Sciences at the University of Pittsburgh, PQI provides leadership throughout Pittsburgh in areas that impact the “second quantum revolution”.

PQI members have faculty appointments from Duquesne University, Carnegie Mellon University, and the University of Pittsburgh in physics, chemistry, and engineering disciplines. The Pittsburgh Quantum Institute currently consists of 100 professors and their groups, a number that keeps growing every year with faculty appointments in the various departments of the member institutions.

PQI sponsors and organizes research seminars, panel discussions, public lectures, and outreach activities, and a signature event (PQI20XX in April) that brings in a dozen plenary speakers and a public lecture.

PQI supports graduate students with research and travel awards, and sponsors two well-attended poster sessions per year. The PQI website (www.pqi.org) highlights research and researchers, hosts multiple videos, and provides a regular feed of information relevant to the PQI community.

PQI also coordinates with other important centers and facilities (Pittsburgh Supercomputing Center, Petersen Institute for Nanoscience and Engineering, Carnegie Mellon University Nanofabrication Facility, and the Center for Research Computing).

== Scientific Outreach ==
PQI faculty and student members participate by delivering lectures at the annual PQI symposium as well as participating in other external events where they showcase their research in an effort to promote quantum sciences. The institute is also involved in outreach programs that target high schools, undergraduate colleges, and the general public.

In addition to hosting guest speakers from around the world in the field of quantum science, PQI hosts or participates in a number of notable Pittsburgh educational events:

- PQI2022
- PQI2018
- Science2017 - poster session
- PQI2017: Quantum Revolutions
- Women in Quantum Science and Engineering Lecture Series
- Science2016: Game Changers - poster session
- PQI2016: Quantum Challenges
- Science2015: Unleashed! - poster session
- PQI2015: Quantum Coherence
- PQI2014: Quantum Technologies
- PQI2013: Quantum Matter

== History ==
Initially defined as the Pitt Quantum Initiative, PQI was established in 2012 to help unify and promote quantum science and engineering in Pittsburgh. The Pitt Quantum Initiative was supported and funded by the Office of the Provost for Research of the University of Pittsburgh. Then vice-provost Dr. George Klinzing acted with cofounders Drs. Jeremy Levy and Andrew Daley to officially launch the initiative in September 2012. PQI finally became institutionalized in 2014.

“Quantum physics is an area where Pitt not only has a well-established reputation, but where its strength and reputation are growing rapidly with the introduction of many new groups over the course of the last few years,” said PQI advisory committee member Andrew Daley, then assistant professor in Pitt’s Department of Physics and Astronomy.

== Organization ==
Staff offices for the Pittsburgh Quantum Institute currently occupy space in the historic Thaw Hall on the University of Pittsburgh's campus. During its inception, PQI staff shared workspace with Dr. Jeremy Levy's research group until dedicated office space was provisioned in the summer of 2015.

PQI faculty and students reside in the offices and laboratories provided by their respective parent universities.

=== Executive Board ===
The executive board, led by director Dr. Jeremy Levy, includes a dozen faculty from all three institutions, as well as Dr. Andrew Daley, who kept his honorary cofounder seat despite moving his lab to the University of Strathclyde, Scotland, in the fall of 2013.

=== Logo ===
The PQI logo was designed using the widely used Dirac notation, which makes it instantaneously recognizable by the quantum community.
