= Global supply chain governance =

Global supply-chain governance (SCG) is a term that originated around the mid-2000. It is a governing system of rules, structures and institutions that guide, control, and lead supply chains, through policies and regulations, with the goal of creating greater efficiency. Governing systems are put into place by different actors, such as international organizations and individual firms, within the global supply chain. The global supply chain is the process of transforming raw materials into an end product, which often occurs in several different countries, moving products and services from producers to consumers. Through increased globalization and international codependency, this process is expanding. This has led to the idea that there should be governing system in place to help guide these global supply chains to perform more efficiently.

There is not always a distinction made between supply-chain management and global supply-chain governance though they are fundamentally different. Supply-chain management (SCM) is the actions taken to manage the system from within. It deals with the flow of materials through the global supply chain to ensure that the system produces efficiently per capita. Both systems are working to improve the efficiency of the global supply chain, the difference is that SCM deals with the products in the system and their efficiency in the system. SCG focus on the system as a whole and the interactions between firms.

While the objective to SCG is to govern supply chains to operate in an efficient manner, not all actors implement the same models of governance to do this. The main conflicting models of governance strategy differ in how they understand the global supply chain. They put emphasis on different external and internal factors and how these differences affect policy decisions. These policies may come up against barriers in several different ways, such as when attempting to integrate policies across different cultures. While there are barriers to effective SCG, there are also facilitators that help in its promotion, such as collaborative planning across firms.

== Objectives ==
Governance strategies are defined as a “firm’s objective to attain operational and strategic efficiencies through collaboration among internal functions and with other firms”. The various stakeholders that work together to encourage good governance are looking to ensure sustainability and Corporate Social Responsibility in the international system. These stakeholders have vested interest in the capacity of the system to be sustainable and thus lobby for governance strategies that will support this goal. Different types of stakeholders will support the system in different capacities. Activists groups supporting a variety of causes are often engaged in promoting good governance.

A guideline for ‘good governance’ has been developed by the United Nations Development Programme (UNDP). This outline was created in reference to democratic governance and the governance of human development. However, the principals are applicable to the global supply chain as well. The five main principal that are identified as critical for good governance are; legitimacy, direction, performance, accountability, and fairness.

Legitimacy is the principal that the governance strategy is built on a consensus of participation. Corporations must allow stakeholders to be involved in the policy formulation process in the global supply chain and their objectives and concerns must be represented in the final governance strategy.

Direction refers to the strategic vision that the corporation has for the supply chain. It identifies what the true goal of a governance strategy is (cost reduction, corporate social responsibility, etc.).

Performance measures the responsiveness of the institutions and the underlying structure that is being governed. It is a measure of effectiveness and whether the outcomes observed are desirable. Corporations must engage in this so they can verify that they are being successful at every level of the global supply chain.

Accountability refers to the transparency of the policy as well as the process in which it was developed.

Fairness considered the impartially of the governance strategy and an evaluation of the winners and losers. Within the global supply chain good governance looks like corporations at every level of production and distribution having autonomy within the governance formulation process. Everyone one of these good governance principles contributes to a sustainable and well functioning global supply chain.

== Benefits ==
Corporations will engage in a governance strategy in order to achieve greater benefits from the global supply chain. While these decisions are most often in search of cost reduction strategies there are also some corporations that consider environmental factor and good corporate social relationships when creating a global supply-chain governance strategy.

O'Shea, Golden, and Olander identify risks from global supply-chain disruptions as another of the primary pressures that influence governance strategy formulation and implementation. Supply of resources is critical in the global supply chain and any risks to the availability of resources must be seriously considered. Climate change and extreme weather patterns have a growing impact on the supply of key supply-chain inputs, this forces firms to take action in terms of preserving these resources and innovating around the problem (i.e. Finding a substitution). Environmental considerations being made in global supply-chain governance are also often an attempt to promote good corporate social relationships.

Corporations wanting to engage in strong corporate social relationships may look to organizations such as the World Social Forum for governance advice. The world social forum is a civil society organizations that criticizes corporate governance organizations for their profit driven perception of the system creates winners and losers. The world social forum advocates for the groups that they feel are oppressed or exploited by the global supply chain. In the global supply-chain decision making is primarily profit driven. The strategies promoted by the World Social help to mitigate possible exploitation and ensure that corporations are implementing ethical as well as profitable governance strategies.

== External pressures ==
The global supply chain is a complex and intricate system where goods are produced and distributed internationally. It is a system made up of a wide variety of actors and the interactions and cooperation of these actors determines the efficiency and effectiveness of this system. The ideology behind creating governance strategies to support this system is to improve the efficiency and to hold actors accountable to a certain standard.

Governance strategies will look different depending on the actors and the situation they are created to guide. Each strategy must be created specifically for the situation and will be a result of the balance of powers between actors. The efficiency of the global supply-chain governance cannot be commented on as a whole, each corporation will instate their own governance strategy. That being said there is a basic theoretical understanding that supports the merits of having a governance strategy in place and encourages actors to take part in one.

O’Rourke argues that there are two main external pressures being placed on actors in the global supply chain that contribute to the formulation of governance strategies. Regulatory pressures are placed on corporations engaging in the global supply chain to ensure best practises. Ranging from trade regulations to sustainability goals these pressure are enforced throughout the international community. Failing to uphold agreements at this level will affect a firm’s reputation and credibility. International institutions may not hold a lot of direct power but as a result of international legitimacy they have the ability to enforce regulations. Governance strategies can arise out of these regulations in order to uphold international ideas of best practice among actors. Competitive pressures are highly determinant in the global supply chain. Decisions made are primarily profit based and so governance strategies are highly dependent on what competition does. Lesson drawing between firms is a highly effective way for innovation to spread throughout the system and best practices to be identified. This can also be somewhat restrictive as regulator chill may result in the abandonment of some governance strategies. The final goal of these pressures is to create sustainability within the system meaning that it is a system that can withstand political, economic, social, environmental, and whatever challenges that it may face.

== Just in Time ==
Just in time is a demand driven global supply-chain governance model. Corporations use this model to eliminate wastefulness in the global supply chain. While the model strives to save money there are other inherent benefits. The main objective of the Just in Time model is to eliminate the need for stocking inventory at every level of production in the global supply chain. By supplying materials only when they are needed corporations save on the cost of storage and the potential for overproduction of a product is eliminated. This models gives individuals within the global supply chain the autonomy to get the specific amount of stock.

== Walmart's success ==
Walmart’s rise to dominance has been attributed to the global supply-chain governance strategies that have been employed. As the corporation has grown and the global economy changed around it, Walmart has consistently implemented successful global supply-chain governance strategies that ensure the highest profit is achieved. Walmart began by cutting out as many links in the supply chain as possible. By working directly with manufacturers Walmart was able to eliminate the cost of dealing with a middleman. Walmart also follows a model called Strategic Vendor Partnership where it they are ensure the lowers price by entering into a long-term partnership with the producer. This is a mutually beneficial partnership protecting the interesting of both actors. By streamlining this process of collaboration the corporation is able to secure a sustainable and efficient global supply chain.

== Integration ==
Global supply-chain governance becomes more efficient with greater integration both internally and externally. Internal integration is defined as integration within a firm’s boundaries whereas external integration occurs "between a firm and its external partners, which highlights the importance of buyer/seller cooperation." Internal integration focuses on coordination and collaborative efforts between all the different departments of the firm, such as HR and Marketing, Purchasing and Manufacturing etc. It is the unity of the firm. External integration focus is on its relationship with its partners and occurs when "two or more companies share the responsibility of exchanging common planning, management, execution, and performance measurement information." This type of integration helps to establish competitiveness in the global business environment by allowing firms "to pool resources, exploit complementary skills and share information across firms." External integration can be seen in the Just in Time model, where inventory is eliminated at the unnecessary levels of production. Firms that chose to have inventory at every level do not do this for efficiency but because of a lack of external integrated governance across the supply chain.

Integration can be seen by firms involved in global supply chains as beneficial and thus worth the effort to implement. Studies have found that both integration types are beneficial to efficiency but when firms only focus on internal integration and ignore external integration, sub-optimal performance is likely to occur. Without the teamwork of external integration efforts, internal integration only focuses on individual efficiencies despite being a part of a larger supply chain.

=== Barriers to integration ===
Several explanations for why internal and external integration efforts within supply-chain governance may come up against barriers. Ellinger, Keller and Hansen argue the following are barriers to integration. Attempting to create a more integrated structure is limited when there is insufficient knowledge. Internal integration is limited when insufficient knowledge exists across different functions of the firm. External integration is limited when insufficient knowledge exists across different firms and levels of the supply chain. Lack of communication internally and across the entire supply chain is another barrier to integration. Poor working relationship is also an issue to integration efforts. When conflict or power struggles exists between different functions of the firm or between different levels of the supply-chain integration becomes challenging. Barriers can occur when there is not agreement on end goals between the different areas attempting to integrate. Finally, lack of direction from senior management can disrupt the efficiency of integration both internally and externally. These barriers to integration are found in the structuring and governing of global supply chains. Other barriers exist in the actual implementation of these systems. Such as “ lack of trust, failure to understand the importance of supply-chain integration, fear associated with losing control, misaligned goals and objectives, poor information systems, short-term as opposed to long-term focus, and supply-chain complexity issues”. Though these barriers to implementation are more an issue for supply-chain management, rather than supply-chain governance.

=== Facilitators of integration ===
Many of the barriers to integration efforts can be resolved and become facilitators to internal and external integration. Rickey, Roath, Whipple and Fawcett outline some of the facilitators to integration both internally and externally. Internal integration can be facilitated by encouraging inclusive communication within the firm, reducing inter-firm conflict and encourage strong working relationships, structure the different functions of the firm to foster joint accountability and encourage senior management involvement. External integration can be facilitated by encouraging collaborative efforts. By encouraging interdependence, firms are better able to eliminate inefficiencies because they both depend on each other. Common goals and objectives also facilitate this. Effective communication and information sharing also help to facilitate external integration through strong firm relationship.

=== Benefits to integration ===
Efficiencies are created when integration is done effectively. The benefits to creating greater integration allows for the same benefits that come from implementing supply-chain governance strategies in a broader sense (as integration is a part of that governance strategy). Disruptions in the supply chain are lessened, inventories are reduced to only exist at the necessary levels, unnecessary middlemen and levels of the supply chain are eliminated, transportation costs lessen, cycle times are improved, and customer service levels are heightened.
