= Timeline of the Gaza war (12 January 2024 – 6 May 2024) =

- Initial attacks; (7–27 October 2023); Invasion of the Gaza Strip; (28 October 2023 – 23 November 2023); First ceasefire; (24 November 2023 – 11 January 2024); Yemen airstrikes; (12 January 2024 – 6 May 2024); Rafah offensive; (7 May 2024 – 12 July 2024); Al-Mawasi attack; (13 July 2024 – 26 September 2024); Attack on Hezbollah headquarters; (27 September 2024 – 16 October 2024); Killing of Yahya Sinwar; (17 October 2024 – 26 November 2024); Israel–Lebanon ceasefire agreement; (27 November 2024 – 18 January 2025); Israel–Hamas ceasefire agreement; (19 January 2025 – 17 March 2025); March 2025 Israeli attacks on the Gaza Strip; (18 March 2025 – 15 May 2025); May 2025 Gaza offensive; (16 May 2025 – 19 August 2025); August 2025 Gaza offensive; (20 August 2025 – 2 October 2025); October 2025 Israel–Hamas ceasefire agreement; (3 October 2025 – present)

== January 2024 ==
=== 12 January ===
- The Gaza Health Ministry reported that 151 Palestinians were killed by Israeli attacks in the past 24 hours, bringing its count of the death toll to 23,708.
- The US and UK conducted airstrikes against over a dozen Houthi targets in Yemen, killing five fighters and wounding six others.
- 11 Palestinians were killed in an Israeli airstrike targeting a house hosting displaced people south of Deir el-Balah.
- An Israeli airstrike killed at least eight Palestinians in the Al-Manara neighbourhood in Khan Yunis.
- Israel reached an agreement with Qatar to deliver medicine to hostages in Gaza. It was later shown the medicine never reached the hostages.
- Speaking at the United Nations Security Council, UN humanitarian aid relief chief Martin Griffiths stated colleagues who had reached northern Gaza in recent days had described "scenes of utter horror: Corpses left lying in the road. People with evident signs of starvation stopping trucks in search of anything they can get to survive."
- The UN stated Israel was blocking medical supplies to northern Gaza.
- Newborn babies at Al-Aqsa hospital in Deir al-Balah were at risk due to the blackout.
- Israel paused operations in the Al-Shaboura neighborhood to allow the delivery of humanitarian aid.

=== 13 January ===
- The Gaza Health Ministry reported that 135 Palestinians were killed by Israeli attacks in the past 24 hours, bringing its count of the death toll to 23,843.
- An 18-year-old Palestinian teenager was reportedly beaten to death by Israeli soldiers during a raid in Zeita, Tulkarm.
- A Palestinian grandmother was shot and killed by an Israeli sniper in northern Gaza.
- The US carried out a second air raid in Houthi-controlled Yemen, with no casualties or damages according to the Houthis.
- The Badr Organization announced the submission of a draft law that would require the expulsion of US troops in Iraq.

=== 14 January ===
- The IDF announced a soldier of the Combat Engineering Corps was killed the day before in fighting in southern Gaza, bringing the IDF death toll in Gaza to 188.
- Al Jazeera reported that an Israeli strike hit a house in Rafah, killing 14 Palestinians, including a two-year-old girl.
- The Gaza Health Ministry reported that 125 Palestinians were killed in Israeli attacks in the Gaza Strip in the last 24 hours, bringing its count of the death toll to 23,968.
- Al Jazeera reported that two Paltel employees were killed in Israeli operations on Gaza.
- TRT reported that Israeli troops opened fire on Palestinian civilians attempting to access the limited amount of humanitarian aid in Gaza.

=== 15 January ===
- The Gaza Health Ministry reported that at least 132 Palestinians were killed in Israeli attacks in the past 24 hours, bringing the Gaza death toll to 24,100.
- At least 33 Palestinians were killed by morning Israeli airstrikes on houses in Khan Yunis. A further 22 others were killed in airstrikes in the central Gaza Strip that same morning.
- Armed Israeli settlers attacked the Palestinian village of Burin, south of Nablus, after midnight.
- Israeli forces bulldozed two Palestinian houses during a midnight raid in Qalqilya.
- The Houthis fired an anti-ship cruise missile towards a US destroyer in the Red Sea, which was shot down by a US fighter jet.
- A woman was killed while 17 others were injured in a series of car-ramming attacks in Raanana, Israel. Two Palestinians from Hebron who were suspected to have conducted the attacks using stolen vehicles were arrested.
- At least 25 Palestinians were killed in evening Israeli airstrikes in the Gaza Strip.
- A video released by the Qassam Brigades appeared to show two Israeli hostages killed by Israeli airstrikes.
- Israel announced the withdrawal of its 36th Division from the Deir al-Balah Governorate of the Gaza Strip.
- The Houthis announced that they would expand their attacks to include US and UK naval and commercial vessels.
- The World Health Organization reported a rise in Hepatitis A cases in Gaza.

=== 16 January ===
- Iran said it launched missile strikes against a Mossad base in Erbil, in Iraq's Kurdistan Region, killing four people and injuring six.
- Israel announced that a soldier of the 55th Paratroopers Brigade was killed fighting in Gaza the day prior. Another soldier also died from injuries sustained in December, bringing the IDF death toll in Gaza to 190.
- The Gaza Health Ministry reported that at least 158 Palestinians were killed in Israeli attacks in the past 24 hours. Some bodies were also recovered from rubble in the northern Gaza Strip, bringing its count of the death toll to 24,285.
- The UN's OCHA reported that 378,000 people in Gaza were facing 'phase 5' or catastrophic levels of hunger and that 939,000 others were facing 'phase 4' or emergency levels of hunger.
- The Malta-flagged, Greek-owned ship Zografia was hit by a missile in the Red Sea with no injuries reported, The Houthis claimed responsibility.
- Shelling from a nearby attack damaged the al-Amal hospital.
- The Health Ministry reported that 350,000 chronically ill patients were deprived of medication.
- According to UNOCHA, "Lack of fuel for water, sanitation and hygiene increases risks of health and environmental hazards," while "Lack of medicine debilitated the functionality of the six partially functioning hospitals".

=== 17 January ===
- At least 23 Palestinians were killed in early morning airstrikes in Rafah and Khan Younis.
- An Israeli bulldozer was targeted by Palestinians with an explosive device in Tulkarm after Israeli bulldozers destroyed streets and infrastructure in the city.
- The Gaza Health Ministry reported that 168 Palestinians were killed in Israeli attacks in the past 24 hours, bringing its count of the death toll to 24,448.
- Four Palestinians were killed in an Israeli drone strike in Tulkarm. Another Israeli drone strike killed three Palestinians in Nablus.
- An Israeli drone strike on a car in the Balata refugee camp killed one Palestinian. The Palestine Red Crescent Society said Israeli forces fired at ambulances trying to reach the burning vehicle.
- The US re-designated the Houthi movement as a "Specially Designated Global Terrorist" following their attacks on shipping in the Red Sea.
- The Jordanian army said its military field hospital in Khan Yunis was badly damaged by Israeli shelling nearby.
- Israel reported that two soldiers of the 14th Armoured Brigade and a third from the Givati brigade was killed during the fighting in Gaza, bringing the IDF death toll there to 193.
- The mother of a recovered deceased captive accused the IDF of killing her son by filling the tunnel he was held in with poison gas.
- Israeli forces blew up and destroyed the Israa University in Gaza City.
- The Jordanian field hospital in Khan Younis was severely damaged by Israeli shelling.

=== 18 January ===
- In the early hours of the morning, 16 Palestinians were killed by Israeli shelling in Rafah.
- The Gaza Health Ministry reported that 172 Palestinians were killed in Israeli attacks in the past 24 hours, bringing its count of the death toll to 24,620.
- The US launched another air strike on Houthi territory in Yemen and claimed to have destroyed 14 missiles.
- Israeli forces arrested 46 people from one family in Teqoa village near Bethlehem.
- Six Palestinians was killed in an Israeli raid in Tulkarm.
- The IDF said that it had reached the southernmost parts of Khan Yunis.
- The Secretary General of Kata'ib Hezbollah, Abu Hussein al Hamidawi, said that the group said it would interpret an attack on the Houthis as an attack on their group.
- The Aqsa Martyrs' Brigades clashed with Israeli forces in Zawata, west of Nablus, and Qalqilya, injuring an Israeli Border Police officer.
- An attacker wounded two people before being killed by Israeli police in Jerusalem.
- The Islamic Resistance in Iraq claimed responsibility for a drone attack targeting US forces in Himu, Syria.
- Families of Hamas captives in Gaza staged a protest and blocked the Ayalon Highway in Tel Aviv.
- The Palestinian foreign ministry accused Israel of committing 15 "massacres" killing 172 people in 24 hours under the cover of a communications blackout in the Gaza strip.
- Israeli Prime Minister Benjamin Netanyahu told the White House that he rejects any moves to "establish a Palestinian state".
- The Al-Qassam Brigades fired rockets from the Gaza Strip towards Kissufim in southern Israel.

=== 19 January ===
- Israel announced a soldier of the Givati brigade was killed the day prior while fighting in southern Gaza, bringing the IDF death toll to 194.
- The Gaza Health Ministry reported that 142 Palestinians were killed in Israeli attacks in the past 24 hours, bringing its count of the death toll to 24,762.
- An Israeli siege of Tulkarm stretched for more than 40 hours, claiming that they are attempting to root out resistance in the city.
- An Israeli air strike hit a residential building west of Khan Younis, killing five people.
- An Israeli air strike on an apartment block near the al-Shifa Hospital killed 12 people and injured more.
- The Al-Nasser Salah al-Deen Brigades released a video of an Israeli captive who it claimed was killed by an Israeli airstrike in the Gaza Strip.
- Jordan stated Israel had again targeted its field hospital, shooting inside at sheltering staff.
- The Red Crescent stated Israeli gunfire wounded displaced people at al-Amal hospital.

=== 20 January ===
- Suspected Israeli airstrikes in Damascus killed at least ten people, including the head of intelligence of the IRGC in Syria, his deputy, and two other IRGC officers.
- The Gaza Health Ministry reported that 165 Palestinians were killed in Israeli attacks in the past 24 hours, bringing its count of the death toll to 24,927.
- A 17-year-old with American citizenship was killed by Israeli forces east of Ramallah. The US said it was investigating the incident.
- Clashes broke out between Israeli forces and Palestinians resisting a raid in Balata refugee camp, and an IDF bulldozer destroyed civilian infrastructure.
- A 20-year-old Palestinian man was shot and injured by Israeli forces during a raid on the Rafidia area, west of Nablus.
- The IDF shelled the al-Katiba area and the al-Amal neighbourhood in Khan Yunis.
- Thousands of Yemenis demonstrated in Sana'a to support Palestine and protest against Western attacks on Yemen.
- The Islamic Resistance in Iraq claimed responsibility for a missile attack targeting US forces in Al-Asad Airbase.
- Airstrikes in Khan Younis were reportedly concentrated in the areas around Nasser Medical Complex and likewise the Jordanian field hospital.

=== 21 January ===
- The Gaza Health Ministry reported that 178 Palestinians were killed in Israeli attacks in the past 24 hours, bringing its count of the death toll to 25,105.
- Israel announced that a soldier of the Kiryati Brigade was killed in the fighting in Gaza, bringing the IDF death toll there to 195.
- US intelligence agencies estimated that Israeli forces killed 20–30% of Hamas's total fighters throughout the war.
- A protest was held in Tel Aviv demanding the release of Hamas captives and elections to replace Netanyahu's government.
- The IDF dropped leaflets in southern Gaza offering benefits for those who would provide information on captives taken by Hamas.
- Israel shelled the eastern part of the Jabalia refugee camp, killing four Palestinians and injuring 21 more, according to the Palestine Red Crescent Society.

=== 22 January ===
- The Gaza Health Ministry reported that 190 Palestinians were killed by Israeli attacks in the past 24 hours, bringing its count of the death toll to 25,295.
- Israel announced that three soldiers of the Paratroopers Brigade were killed fighting in the Gaza Strip, while at least 21 soldiers were killed after an explosion caused the building they were in to collapse, bringing the total IDF death toll in Gaza to 219.
- The Red Crescent reported at least 50 deaths from Israeli attacks in western Khan Yunis.
- Israel's war cabinet reportedly approved a plan coordinated by Egyptian and Qatari negotiators that could see the release of over 130 hostages in exchange for a temporary ceasefire of up to two months.
- Egypt warned Israel that any attempt to seize control of the Philadelphi Corridor would cause a "serious threat" to diplomatic relations between the two countries.
- Protesters stormed the Knesset to demand the Israeli government do more to secure the release of captives held in the Gaza Strip.
- The Abu Ali Mustafa Brigades with the al Aqsa Martyrs' Brigades claimed that it conducted an attack south of Jenin.
- The Houthis claimed to have fired missiles at the US-flagged heavy load carrier Ocean Jazz but did not state whether they hit the vessel. And the US and the UK conducted combined strikes on eight Houthi military targets that was supported by Australia, Bahrain, Canada, and the Netherlands.
- According to UNOCHA, Israeli troops raided the al-Khair Hospital in the west of Khan Younis, arrested staff and ordered civilians at the hospital to move further south.
- The Palestinian Red Crescent reported that Nasser Hospital was under attack. It also reported the IDF was attacking its ambulance center in Khan Younis and had lost contact with staff there, preventing paramedics from reaching wounded people.

=== 23 January ===
- The IDF said it had encircled Khan Yunis and deepened its operations in the area.
- The Gaza Health Ministry reported that 195 Palestinians were killed in Israeli attacks in the past 24 hours, bringing its count of the death toll to 25,490.
- The IDF fired artillery shells at al-Amal hospital and the headquarters of the Palestine Red Crescent Society in Khan Yunis, killing one person.
- Israeli settlers stormed the Al-Aqsa Mosque in Jerusalem under the protection of Israeli police and set fire to a car showroom near the village of Beitin, east of Ramallah.
- Hamas urged the UN, Red Cross and World Health Organization to step in "immediately" and "shoulder their responsibilities" to stop Israel's attacks on Gaza's hospitals.
- A Palestinian man was shot and killed by Israeli reservists near a checkpoint in Tulkarm.
- Hamas claimed that its fighters seized three drones south of Zeitoun and detonated a mine field targeting Israeli vehicles in Juhor ad Dik.
- The PIJ and the al Aqsa Martyrs' Brigades fired missiles at Nahal Oz.
- Hezbollah launched at least 15 rockets targeting an IDF base on Mount Meron "in retaliation" for Israeli attacks in Syria.
- The Islamic Resistance in Iraq launched a drone targeting the port of Ashdod.
- Israeli settlers stormed the Al-Aqsa Mosque located in Jerusalem under the protection of Israeli police, and set fire to a car showroom near the village of Beitin, east of Ramallah.
- Hamas urged the UN, Red Cross and World Health Organization to step in "immediately" and "shoulder their responsibilities" to stop Israel's attacks on Gaza's hospitals.

=== 24 January ===
- The Gaza Health Ministry reported that at least 210 Palestinians were killed and 354 injured in Israeli attacks in the past 24 hours, bringing its count of the death toll to 25,700.
- A crowd of Israeli protesters gathered to stop aid trucks from entering Gaza at the Karab Abu Salem border crossing.
- The US conducted airstrikes on three Kata'ib Hezbollah facilities in al-Qaim and the 46th and 47th PMF brigades in Jurf al-Nasr, Iraq in response to the attack on Ain al Assad Airbase on 20 January.
- The Islamic Resistance in Iraq claimed responsibility for an attack against US forces at Erbil International Airport and Ain al Assad Base in Iraq and at Conoco Mission Support Site in Deir ez-Zor Governorate in Syria.
- At least 13 people were killed and 56 injured after Israel struck a UNRWA training centre.
- People fleeing Nasser Hospital were reportedly killed by Israeli tanks and drones.
- Three civilians were killed in an airstrike on the Palestine Red Crescent Society headquarters.
- The Red Crescent reported the IDF had imposed a curfew on Al-Amal Hospital.

=== 25 January ===
- The Gaza Health Ministry reported that at least 200 Palestinians were killed by Israeli attacks in the past 24 hours, bringing its count of the death toll to 25,900.
- The UN said that 12 people were killed by tank fire on a UN shelter housing thousands of displaced civilians in Khan Yunis. Israel denied responsibility and said it was investigating the incident.
- Hundreds of protesters called on the Netanyahu government to secure the immediate release of captives held in the Gaza Strip, blocking Tel Aviv's Ayalon Highway before rallying outside the nearby IDF headquarters.
- Four children were killed when Israeli warplanes bombed a residential area in the Nuseirat refugee camp.
- 20 Palestinians were killed and 150 seriously injured, after Israeli troops opened fire on a crowd gathering to receive humanitarian aid at a roundabout in Gaza City.
- The PIJ and the PFLP conducted a combined attack targeting an Israeli supply line in the Central Governorate of the Gaza Strip.
- Hezbollah launched two one-way attack drones at Iron Dome batteries in Kfar Blum.
- The United States and United Kingdom sanctioned four Houthi officials, namely "defense Minister" Mohamed al-Atifi, "maritime forces commander" Muhammad Fadl Abd-al-Nabi, "coastal defense forces chief" and "naval college director" Muhammad Ali al-Qadiri and "procurement director" Mohammad Ahmad al-Talibi.
- Israeli forces assaulted Palestinian police officers at the Manger Square in Bethlehem.
- The Gaza Health Ministry reported bombing near the Nasser Hospital.
- UNOCHA reported three hospitals and the Red Crescent ambulance center were besieged.

=== 26 January ===
- The Gaza Health Ministry reported that 183 Palestinians were killed by Israeli attacks in the past 24 hours, bringing its count of the death toll to 26,083.
- Israel announced that a soldier of the Combat Engineering Corps was killed fighting in Gaza, bringing the death toll there to 220.
- The PIJ fired rockets targeting five locations in southern Israel, including Ashkelon, Nir Am, and Sderot while the Mujahideen Brigades fired rockets at what it claimed was an IDF headquarters for the Gaza Division's "Northern Brigade" and at Nahal Oz.
- The al-Aqsa Martyrs' Brigades and PIJ's "Tubas Battalion" claimed that they targeted Israeli forces with explosives and small arms fire in Tubas, and clashes took place in Jenin and Qalandiya between Hamas and Israeli forces.
- Hezbollah targeted Israeli barracks in Gonen using an Iranian-made Falaq-1 rocket system, saying that this was the first attack using the weapon during the war.
- An Israeli overnight air raid on a house in the al-Hassayna neighbourhood of the Nuseirat refugee camp killed at least 11 people.
- The International Court of Justice issued a ruling on South Africa's genocide case against Israel over the Gaza conflict, ordering the latter to do all it can to prevent death, destruction and acts of genocide. However, it did not order Israel to stop military operations there.
- A Houthi missile attack on the British-linked oil tanker Marlin Luanda caused a fire on board which lasted several hours but did not cause injuries. The USS Carney and other coalition ships responded to the attack and provided assistance.
- The Palestinian Red Crescent reported a third day of bombing around its headquarters.
- A Gaza Health Ministry spokesman stated Israel was deliberately paralyzing Al-Amal and Nasser Hospitals.
- The gate of Al-Amal Hospital was reportedly hit by Israeli tank fire.
- An Israeli overnight air raid on a house in the al-Hassayna neighbourhood of the Nuseirat refugee camp killed at least 11 people.

=== 27 January ===
- The Gaza Health Ministry reported that 174 Palestinians were killed in Israeli attacks in the past 24 hours, bringing its count of the death toll to 26,257.
- The US and UK launched two airstrikes on the port of Ras Issa, Yemen.
- A 27-year-old Palestinian man was shot and killed by Israeli forces northeast of Jenin.
- UN Commissioner-General Philippe Lazzarini said that UNRWA aid for Palestinian refugees may end due to the suspension of funding from several countries in response to allegations that members of its staff participated in the 7 October attack.
- The Islamic Resistance in Iraq claimed a rocket attack targeting US forces at Conoco in Syria, and at Ain al Assad airbase in Iraq.
- Hezbollah conducted 14 attacks primarily targeting Israeli military forces and infrastructure.
- The CEO of the International Federation of Red Cross stated, "Heavy fighting continue to escalate in the surroundings of Palestine Red Crescent Al-Amal Hospital in Khan Yunis, resulting in several injuries and hindering PRCS teams from reaching those in need."
- Snipers outside al-Amal Hospital were reportedly preventing anyone from leaving the hospital.
- The Gaza Health Ministry mentioned that Israeli drone fire had destroyed Nasser's water tanks.

=== 28 January ===
- The Gaza Health Ministry reported that at least 165 Palestinians were killed in Israeli attacks in the past 24 hours, bringing its count of the death toll to 26,422.
- A protest was held in Tel Aviv calling for Netanyahu's resignation and early elections, some protestors were arrested by police.
- The Qassam Brigades said that fighters successfully targeted two Merkava tanks with two Yassin 105 RPGs in the Jourat al-Aqqad area west of Khan Younis, and two other Merkava tanks were hit by RPGs in the al-Amal neighbourhood.
- A drone attack on Tower 22, a small US Army outpost in Jordan, killed three American service personnel and wounded at least 34 others. Biden said the attack was carried out by Iran-backed militias from Iraq and Syria.
- The Islamic Resistance in Iraq claimed to have fired unspecified munitions at an Israeli naval facility in the Zvulun Valley.

=== 29 January ===
- The Gaza Health Ministry reported that at least 215 Palestinians were killed in Israeli attacks in the past 24 hours, bringing its count of the death toll to 26,637.
- An Israeli tank attacked a car in Tal al-Hawa, killing a 6-year-old girl and five of her family members, a cousin and two PRCS paramedics attempted to help her but were later killed by Israeli forces.
- Sky News reported that Israel agreed to a framework for a hostage release deal during a meeting in Paris with US, Qatari, and Egyptian officials.
- At least ten rockets were fired toward central Israel.
- Two Palestinian brothers were shot and killed by Israeli forces in the streets of the al-Amal neighbourhood while evacuating and carrying a white flag.
- Israeli cabinet ministers attended the "Return to Gaza" conference to plan illegal settlements in the Strip.
- The PIJ claimed that it conducted an indirect fire attack targeting a "major [IDF] logistical support" position near the Sudaniya area, north of Al-Shati refugee camp.
- The Al-Qassam Brigades fired one rocket salvo targeting Tel Aviv.
- Pro-Iran fighters in Lebanon conducted 15 attacks into northern Israel.
- Israel conducted an airstrike targeting an "Iranian military advisor center" in Sayyidah Zaynab, Damascus. Iran's ambassador to Syria denied that the targeted location was an Iranian military advisory center and claimed that no Iranian citizens died in the strike. However, Syrian opposition media reported that the airstrike killed four people, including IRGC members.
- Unspecified militants conducted a rocket attack targeting US forces at al Shaddadi, Al-Hasakah Governorate, Syria.
- The Islamic Resistance in Iraq claimed a drone attack targeting an unspecified "military target" in Israel. Israeli officials did not confirm the attack.
- Israeli forces shot and killed a man in the town of Al-Yamoun, west of Jenin.
- Five Palestinians were arrested by the IDF during a raid on Jenin.
- Israeli cabinet ministers attended the "Return to Gaza" conference to plan illegal settlements in the Strip.
- The Islamic Resistance in Iraq claimed a drone attack targeting an unspecified "military target" in Israel. Israeli officials did not confirm the attack.

=== 30 January ===
- The Gaza Health Ministry reported that 114 Palestinians were killed in Israeli attacks in the past 24 hours, bringing its count of the death toll to 26,751, including at least 11,000 children.
- Israeli forces dressed as women and medics stormed the Ibn Sina Hospital in Jenin, executing three Palestinian militants in their sleep.
- The Al-Farouq Mosque in Khan Yunis refugee camp was bombed by Israeli forces.
- Israeli warplanes targeted a house in the Sabra neighbourhood of Gaza City, killing at least 20 civilians and injuring several others.
- Kata'ib Hezbollah said it would suspend all military operations against the US, and instead stated that they would "continue to defend our people in Gaza in other ways."

=== 31 January ===
- Israel announced that three soldiers were killed in Gaza the day prior, bringing the IDF death toll there to 223.
- The Gaza Health Ministry reported that 150 Palestinians were killed in Israeli attacks in the past 24 hours, bringing its count of the death toll to 26,900.
- Palestinian officials accused Israel of further summary killings after a mass grave was discovered, containing the bodies of 30 people that had been shot dead whilst blindfolded and with their hands bound.
- The IDF declared the Nitzana Border Crossing with Egypt a closed military zone.
- The Palestinian Mujahideen Movement conducted two rocket attacks from the Gaza Strip targeting Reim military base and Beer Sheva.
- The IAF struck Syrian military infrastructure in Daraa.
- The militant group Faylaq al Waad al Sadiq said that it will continue attacks targeting US and "Israeli forces" in Iraq after Kata'ib Hezbollah announced that it suspended its military operations against US forces.
- EU foreign policy chief Josep Borrell said that the EU was planning to launch a naval mission in the Red Sea within three weeks to help defend cargo ships against Houthi attacks.
- Armed Israeli settlers injured two Palestinian children near the village of Susya, south of Hebron.
- Israeli settlers assaulted an elderly man in Masafer Yatta, south of Hebron.
- The Gaza Ministry of Health reported that both the Nasser Medical Complex and Al Amal Hospital had run out of food.
- The Al Amal hospital was completely out of service.

== February 2024 ==
=== 1 February ===
- The Gaza Health Ministry reported that 119 Palestinians were killed in Israeli attacks in the past 24 hours, bringing its count of the death toll to 27,019.
- Dozen bodies of alleged "torture victims" were found in a school in Beit Lahia.
- The Al Quds Brigades fired mortars targeting Israeli forces in Kissufim and the Mujahideen Brigades fired rockets at an Israeli military base and "airstrip" in Reim.
- The Tubas Battalion of Hamas and the Tubas Battalion of the al Aqsa Martyrs' Brigades conducted multiple attacks on Israeli forces during an Israeli raid in the city.
- Iranian-backed militias conducted six cross-border attacks from southern Lebanon into northern Israel.
- The Islamic Resistance in Iraq claimed a drone attack targeting the port of Haifa.
- The Houthis conducted at least four attacks on ships and US naval vessels in the past 24 hours.
- The Palestine Red Crescent Society said Israeli forces stormed al-Amal hospital for the third time.
- Biden signed an executive order that aims to punish settlers who attack Palestinians in the occupied West Bank.
- Protesters blocked aid trucks from leaving the Port of Ashdod.

=== 2 February ===
- The Gaza Health Ministry reported that 112 Palestinians were killed in Israeli attacks in the past 24 hours, bringing its count of the death toll to 27,131.
- The US carried out a series of strikes in Iraq and Syria in retaliation to the attack on Tower 22, striking over 85 targets and killing at least 39 pro-Iran fighters.
- The Houthis launched a surface-to-surface missile targeting Eilat that was intercepted by Israel's Arrow air defense system over the Red Sea.
- Iranian-backed militias conducted five attacks from southern Lebanon into northern Israel.
- Turkey arrested seven people on suspicion of selling information to the Mossad.
- Israeli forces fired at and injured a Palestinian man in Hebron.
- Israeli settlers tried to set a car on fire on the outskirts of as-Sawiya, south of Nablus.

=== 3 February ===
- The Gaza Health Ministry reported that 107 Palestinians were killed in Israeli attacks in the past 24 hours, bringing its count of the death toll to 27,238.
- The US announced new sanctions and charges targeting the IRGC.
- Two Palestinian men in their 20s were hospitalized after being beaten by Israeli forces during a raid in Jenin.
- The al-Aqsa Martyrs' Brigades, DFLP and Hamas conducted attacks west of Gaza city.
- Iranian-backed militias conducted nine attacks from southern Lebanon into northern Israel.
- The Islamic Resistance in Iraq conducted four drone and rocket attacks targeting US forces in Harir Air Base and Ain al Assad Airbase in Iraq and in al Tanf garrison and Rumaylan Landing Zone in Syria.

=== 4 February ===
- Israel announced that a reservist of the Harel Brigade was killed fighting in southern Gaza, bringing the IDF death toll there to 225.
- The Gaza Health Ministry reported that 127 Palestinians were killed in Israeli attacks in the past 24 hours, bringing its count of the death toll to 27,365.
- Two children were killed in an Israeli airstrike on a kindergarten in Rafah. At least 92 people were killed overnight by Israeli attacks in the city.
- Iranian-backed militias conducted at least eight attacks from southern Lebanon into northern Israel.
- Israeli settlers gathered at the entrance of the town of Turmus Ayya, north of Ramallah, and set rubber tyres on fire.
- Israel was accused of withholding the body of a 14-year-old Palestinian boy killed by Israeli forces in the occupied West Bank.
- The Palestinian Red Crescent stated food and fuel at al-Amal hospital were depleted and that "medical supplies and medicines are at zero stock, with a significant shortage of essential drugs for chronic diseases".
- At least eight attacks were conducted from southern Lebanon into northern Israel.

=== 5 February ===
- The Gaza Health Ministry reported that 113 Palestinians were killed in Israeli attacks in the past 24 hours, bringing its count of the death toll to 27,478.
- The al-Aqsa Martyrs' Brigades battalions in Nablus, Tulkarm, and Tubas clashed with Israeli forces while unspecified Palestinian militia fighters fired small arms targeting Israeli forces in Hebron.
- Iranian-backed militias conducted six attacks from southern Lebanon into northern Israel.
- A convoy of trucks waiting to bring food into the Gaza Strip was hit by Israeli fire, damaging several goods.
- A Barbados-flagged, UK-owned cargo ship was attacked by a drone in the Red Sea west of Hodeida, Yemen.
- Israeli forces arrested a minor from the village of Aqqa and two young brothers from the village of Asfi, both in the hamlet of Masafer Yatta, south of Hebron.

=== 6 February ===
- The Gaza Health Ministry reported that 107 Palestinians were killed in Israeli attacks in the past 24 hours, bringing its count of the death toll to 27,585.
- IDF spokesman Daniel Hagari said that 31 additional captives in Gaza had died.
- Canada announced sanctions targeting top officials of Hamas and the PIJ over the 7 October attacks.
- The Palestine Red Crescent Society said that Israeli forces arrested two volunteers with the group near the al-Amal Hospital.
- Ten people were killed and 10 wounded in an Israeli airstrike on a home east of Jabalia refugee camp.
- Israel announced that a soldier of the Combat Engineering Corps had been killed in northern Gaza, bringing the IDF death toll there to 226.
- Six people were killed in Israeli shelling of a police vehicle in Rafah.

=== 7 February ===
- The Gaza Health Ministry reported that 123 Palestinians were killed in Israeli attacks in the past 24 hours, bringing its count of the death toll to 27,703.
- The Houthis fired six anti-ship ballistic missiles towards the southern Red Sea and the Gulf of Aden. No one was injured and only minor damage was reported.
- The IDF stormed Tulkarem, imposing a siege on the Nur Shams camp, killing two Palestinian men.
- An Israeli convoy of military vehicles and bulldozers stormed Jenin.
- Crowds demonstrated outside the US Embassy in Baghdad following social media calls to storm the embassy.
- Israel rejected a Hamas three-stage proposal for a ceasefire.
- Iranian-backed militias conducted four attacks from southern Lebanon into northern Israel.
- The Gaza Health Ministry stated 11,000 people were in urgent need of a medical evacuation.

=== 8 February ===
- The Gaza Health Ministry reported that 130 Palestinians were killed in Israeli attacks in the past 24 hours, bringing its count of the death toll to 27,833.
- The Palestine Red Crescent Society reported that a paramedic was killed and two others were injured after the IDF opened fire directly at them in an area between Al-Ahli Arab Hospital and al-Shifa Hospital while on their way to evacuate the injured.
- Israeli air strikes on two homes killed at least 12 Palestinians and injured many more in the Tel al-Sultan and Saudi neighbourhoods of Rafah.
- Two Palestinians were killed and 10 were injured in an Israeli air raid on a home in Deir el-Balah.
- Armed Israeli settlers attacked Palestinian shepherds and prevented their access to pastures south of Hebron.
- A Palestinian man was wounded and another arrested during a large-scale incursion into Wadi al-Far'a, south of Tubas Governorate.
- A 14-year-old Palestinian girl was shot and killed outside of the besieged Nasser Hospital by an Israeli sniper.
- Two American brothers were detained in Gaza and held in prison in Ashkelon for suspected collaboration with Hamas.

=== 9 February ===
- The Gaza Health Ministry reported that 107 Palestinians were killed in Israeli attacks in the past 24 hours, bringing its count of the death toll to 27,947.
- Israeli snipers killed at least 21 Palestinians near the Nasser Hospital.
- Unspecified Palestinian fighters conducted three attacks targeting Israeli forces in Beit Furik, Tulkarm, and Kafr Qaddum.
- Iranian-backed militias conducted nine cross-border attacks from southern Lebanon into northern Israel. The commander of the IDF Northern Command said that the IDF is preparing for an "expansion of the war" in Lebanon during a meeting with northern Israeli town councils.
- UNRWA director Philippe Lazzarini said that Israel had blocked food for 1.1 million Palestinians in Gaza.
- Israeli forces raided Al-Amal hospital.
- Moroccan hashish suppliers announced that they will no longer selling hashish to Israeli smugglers as a response against Israel's war on Gaza.

=== 10 February ===
- The Gaza Health Ministry reported that 117 Palestinians were killed in Israeli attacks in the past 24 hours, bringing its count of the death toll to 28,064.
- The IDF killed at least 28 Palestinians in strikes on Rafah.
- A Hamas senior official survived an Israeli assassination attempt in Lebanon which killed two civilians.
- Two people were killed in an Israeli attack on a police car in Rafah.
- The Islamic Resistance in Iraq claimed an attack on an unspecified target near the Dead Sea.
- West Bank residents held an anti-Israeli demonstration in Nablus.
- The al-Aqsa Martyrs' Brigades clashed with Israeli forces in Faraa, Tubas.
- Iranian-backed militias conducted six attacks from southern Lebanon into northern Israel.
- Hezbollah claimed that it took control of an IDF Skylark UAV.
- Israel uncovered an underground datacenter used by Hamas for intelligence and communications under UNRWA's HQ in Gaza.

=== 11 February ===
- The Gaza Health Ministry reported that 112 Palestinians were killed in Israeli attacks in the past 24 hours, bringing its count of the death toll to 28,176.
- After the raid on Al-Amal hospital, the IDF took 20 terror operatives hiding in the hospital into custody.
- The Al-Qassam Brigades said on Telegram that Israeli strikes in Gaza killed two Israeli hostages and seriously injured eight others in the past 96 hours.
- Netanyahu said that Israel was "working out a detailed plan" to move Palestinians to areas north of Rafah ahead of an expected ground offensive into the city.
- A senior leader of Hamas said that any Israeli ground offensive into Rafah would end hostage negotiation talks.
- Israeli forces shot and injured a young Palestinian in Battir, west of Bethlehem,
- Unknown militants launched an unsuccessful drone attack targeting US forces at the Conoco Mission Support Site in Deir ez-Zor Governorate, Syria.
- A Jordanian plane with King Abdullah II on board air dropped aid over the Gaza Strip.
- The Palestine Red Crescent Society stated three patients had died at Al-Amal hospital due to Israeli forces preventing oxygen supplies from reaching the hospital. The IDF stated they facilitated delivering 20 oxygen tanks and other medical supplies to the hospital after the raid.

=== 12 February ===
- The IDF said it had rescued two hostages held in Rafah, and conducted "waves of attacks" in the city. Local health officials said 67 people were killed and dozens were injured. Israeli forces hit houses, hospitals and three mosques.
- The Hague Court of Appeals ruled that the Netherlands must ban exports of F-35 fighter jet parts to Israel, citing concerns that they could be used to violate international humanitarian law.
- The Gaza Health Ministry reported that 164 Palestinians were killed in Israeli attacks in the past 24 hours, bringing its count of the death toll to 28,340.
- cargo ship was struck by two Houthi missiles in the Red Sea while it was bound for a port in Iran.
- Israel announced that two soldiers of the Maglan unit were killed fighting in Gaza, bringing the IDF death toll there to 229.
- The Al-Qassam Brigades stated three hostages had been killed and eight wounded during Israeli airstrikes.
- Hezbollah claimed that it targeted a police building in Kiryat Shmona, injuring two people.
- The IAF unsuccessfully targeted a Hezbollah field commander who was responsible for the region of Maroun al-Ras in an airstrike near Bint Jbeil in southern Lebanon.
- Senior Kata'ib Hezbollah official and Popular Mobilization Forces Chief of Staff, Abu Fadak al Mohammadawi said that the "greatest revenge" for the US strike in 7 February will be the expulsion of "foreign forces" from Iraq.
- The Palestinian Mujahideen Movement fired rockets from the Gaza Strip targeting southern Israel.
- Israeli settlers from Rehelim entered as-Sawiya and attacked shepherds by pelting rocks. Another group of settlers from Yitzhar entered the village of Madama, attacking residences and smashing windows.
- Israeli forces in Asira al-Qibliya, south of Nablus, shot and seriously injured a young man and a 16-year-old boy.
- The deputy head of the Russian Center for Reconciliation in Syria claimed that the Israeli air force conducted an airstrike targeting Nairab Airport in Aleppo.

=== 13 February ===
- Israel announced that three soldiers of the Gaza Division were killed fighting in Gaza the day prior, bringing the IDF death toll there to 232, and two other soldiers were injured.
- The US Senate approved an aid package that would provide Israel with US$14 billion, and US$9.15 billion in humanitarian aid to citizens in the Palestinian Territories and other conflict zones.
- The Gaza Health Ministry reported that 133 Palestinians were killed in Israeli attacks in the past 24 hours, bringing its count of the death toll to 28,473.
- France imposed travel bans on 28 Israeli settlers who it said were guilty of violence against Palestinian citizens in the West Bank.
- Israeli snipers killed three people at Nasser Hospital, while a 10-year-old girl died in the intensive care room of the hospital after electricity was cut off overnight.
- At least five people were killed in the Nuseirat camp, while four more were killed by an Israeli bomb in the Al-Brazil neighbourhood of Rafah.
- Israel set a Palestinian truck ablaze in Huwara.
- UK Foreign Secretary David Cameron announced asset freezes and travelbans against Israeli settlers, saying that "Israel must also take stronger action and put a stop to settler violence."
- Hassan Nasrallah said that Hezbollah's cross-border shelling into Israel would only end when Israel's "aggression" on the Gaza Strip stops.
- The Wall Street Journal reported that Israel showed Egypt a plan to evacuate Rafah involving the transfer of residents to 15 sites along Gaza containing 25,000 tents.
- The Palestinian Mujahideen Movement fired a rocket salvo from the Gaza Strip targeting a town in Southern Israel adjacent to Beit Lahia.
- Hezbollah fired anti-tank guided missiles targeting Kiryat Shmona, injuring two Israeli civilians. It also fired rockets targeting the al-Marj site.
- Israel conducted a drone strike targeting an IRGC missile storage facility in Mayadin, Syria.
- Unspecified Iran-backed militias targeted US forces stationed at the al Omar oil field in eastern Syria.

=== 14 February ===
- The Gaza Health Ministry reported that 103 Palestinians were killed in Israeli attacks in the past 24 hours, bringing its count of the death toll to 28,576.
- Israel carried out its heaviest attack on Lebanon since the start of the war, killing four Hezbollah members and ten civilians in response to an attack from Lebanon at the IDF Northern Command headquarters in Safed which killed a female Israeli soldier and wounded eight others. Hezbollah did not claim the attack.
- The al-Aqsa Martyrs' Brigades and PIJ both claimed small arms fire targeting Mairav, a town near the West Bank, there were no injuries.
- CENTCOM conducted a pre-emptive strike that targeted one Houthi mobile anti-ship cruise missile in Yemen.
- The Houthis launched an anti-ship ballistic missile into the Gulf of Aden which landed in open water.
- The IDF arrested three men during raids in Qalqilya. A man was also arrested in Ni'lin, west of Ramallah.

=== 15 February ===
- Israeli troops raided Nasser Medical Complex in what it described as a "limited operation against Hamas", claiming it had credible evidence that Hamas held hostages there. Spokesperson of the Gaza Health Ministry Ashraf al-Qudra said one person was killed and several were wounded.
- The US Army announced that the US Coast Guard seized a Houthi-bound vessel in the Arabian Sea which came from Iran and was carrying weapons and other military aid.
- The Gaza Health Ministry reported that at least 87 Palestinians were killed in Israeli attacks in the past 24 hours, bringing its count of the death toll to 28,663.
- Israel announced that a soldier of the Paratroopers Brigade was killed fighting in Gaza, bringing the IDF death toll there to 233.
- Hezbollah fires at Israel in response to Israel's attacks that killed 10 people in Lebanon.
- At least 11 people were killed in an intense bombardment on the Nuseirat refugee camp.
- Israel arrested at least 20 Palestinians in the West Bank, including a child and a former prisoner.
- The Wall Street Journal reported that Egypt was building a refugee camp surrounded by concrete walls south of Rafah.

=== 16 February ===
- Israel announced that another soldier of the Paratroopers Brigade was killed fighting in southern Gaza the day prior and several others injured, bringing the IDF death toll there to 234.
- At least four people died in the Nasser Hospital after electricity was severed and oxygen supplies were cut.
- Lebanon filed a complaint to the UN Security Council over the series of Israeli attacks on civilian targets on 14 February.
- A gunman killed two people and wounded four others during a mass shooting at a bus stop on near Kiryat Malakhi before being killed by a bystander.
- The Gaza Health Ministry reported that 112 Palestinians were killed in Israeli attacks in the past 24 hours, bringing its count of the death toll to 28,775.
- The New York Times and al-Jazeera reported that Israel was behind two attacks on major gas pipelines in Iran earlier in the week, citing Western intelligence officials and an IRGC strategist.
- Riots broke out near Gaza's border with Egypt after Hamas policemen shot and killed a teenager who was attempting to gather humanitarian aid.
- The al-Quds Brigades fired at Israeli forces stationed at the Dotan checkpoint, south of Mevo Dotan settlement in the West Bank.
- Unidentified Palestinian fighters threw improvised explosive devices at Israeli forces around Aqaba and separately clashed with Israeli forces in Aboud.
- Hezbollah conducted five attacks from southern Lebanon into northern Israel.
- The al-Aqsa Martyrs' Brigades fired rockets and Palestinian Islamic Jihad targeted an IDF site and Ashkelon from the northern Gaza Strip.

=== 17 February ===
- The International Court of Justice rejected South Africa's request for new constraints aimed at preventing an Israeli incursion in Rafah, saying instead that the "perilous situation" in Rafah and all of Gaza required Israel to observe its January ruling, which demanded Israel take "all measures within its power" to prevent the crime of genocide by its forces.
- The Gaza Health Ministry reported that at least 83 Palestinians were killed in Israeli attacks in the past 24 hours, bringing its count of the death toll to 28,858.
- Israel attacked a pregnant woman's house in the Tal az-Zaatar area of the Gaza Strip, leading to the child's stillbirth.
- Eight Palestinians were killed in Israeli air strikes on homes in the al-Zawaida and Dier el-Balah refugee camps, with dozens more injured.
- The Houthis claimed an "accurate and direct" missile strike on a Panamanian-flagged oil tanker carrying crude bound for India.
- The IDF said it attacked a Syrian army position in response to shelling from Syrian territory towards the south of the occupied Golan Heights.
- The US ambassador to the UN said the US would likely veto a UN vote calling for a ceasefire, scheduled for 20 February, saying the text of the resolution proposed by Algeria could jeopardise negotiations aimed at brokering a pause in the war. The veto was criticized by many countries.

=== 18 February ===
- The Gaza Health Ministry reported that 127 Palestinians were killed in Israeli attacks in the past 24 hours, bringing its count of the death toll to 28,985.
- WHO chief Tedros Adhanom Ghebreyesus said Nasser hospital was no longer functional due to the IDF's "week-long siege followed by the ongoing raid".
- Netanyahu said remarks by Brazilian President Lula da Silva comparing Israel's conduct to the Holocaust and Hitler crossed a red line.
- Israel's government unanimously approved a resolution rejecting unilateral international recognition of a Palestinian state.
- Netanyahu stated that he vows to invade Rafah "no matter what". he also rejected calls for an early election as thousands of protesters took to the streets in Tel Aviv and Jerusalem, demanding he step down.
- Hamas chief Ismail Haniyeh blamed Israel for a lack of progress in achieving a ceasefire deal in Gaza.
- At least 10 Palestinians were killed overnight after Israeli forces launched attacks on Deir el-Balah and farmlands on the edges of Rafah.
- Intensive shelling was reported in Beit Hanoon while Israeli raids hit Al-Sekka Street and the Zeitoun neighbourhood in Gaza City.
- Palestinians in Jabalia gathered outside UNRWA headquarters in a protest calling for food to be delivered to the refugee camp.
- Israeli settlers entered the Palestinian village of Turmus Ayya, setting vehicles on fire.
- Israeli war cabinet member Benny Gantz warned that a ground offensive will be launched in Rafah on 10 March unless Hamas has freed all hostages by then. Gantz added Israel would act in "a co-ordinated manner, facilitating the evacuation of civilians in dialogue with our American and Egyptian partners to minimise civilian casualties".
- A Belize-flagged cargo vessel suffered "catastrophic damage" following a Houthi attack in the Bab el-Mandeb strait, which forced her crew to evacuate.
- Al-Amal hospital was shelled by the Israeli military.

=== 19 February ===
- The Gaza Health Ministry reported that 107 Palestinians were killed in Israeli attacks in the past 24 hours, bringing its count of the death toll to 29,092.
- The Palestinian foreign minister accused Israel of "colonialism and apartheid" at the start of a week of International Court of Justice hearings, called by the UN general assembly to assess the legality of Israel's 57-year occupation of Palestinian lands.
- Israel announced that a soldier of the Paratroopers Brigade was killed fighting in Gaza the day prior, bringing the IDF death toll there to 235.
- Reuters reported that the US proposed an alternative draft resolution for the United Nations Security Council calling for a temporary ceasefire and opposing a major Israeli ground offensive in Rafah.
- The European Union announced the start of Operation Aspide, a naval mission to protect shipping in the Red Sea and surrounding waters from Houthi attacks.
- The IAF conducted an airstrike on the Lebanese city of Sidon and Ghazieh.
- The Houthis destroyed a US MQ-9 drone over Hodeida.
- WHO representative Rik Peeperkorn stated, "The degradation of health services needs to stop. A number of countries in the region and even in Europe have reached out and are willing to accept patients. We estimate that at least 8,000 patients need to be referred out of Gaza."

=== 20 February ===
- The Gaza Health Ministry reported that 103 Palestinians were killed in Israeli attacks in the past 24 hours, bringing its count of the death toll to 29,195.
- Israel announced that a soldier of the Paratroopers Brigade died of wounds sustained fighting in Gaza, bringing the IDF death toll there to 236.
- At least one person was killed and many others injured after Israeli forces opened fire on a Palestinian crowd waiting for food aid in northern Gaza.
- A man was injured by bullet fragments during Israeli raids in the Arroub refugee camp, north of Hebron.

=== 21 February ===
- At least two people were killed in a suspected Israeli airstrike on a residential building in the Kafr Sousa neighborhood of Damascus.
- The Gaza Health Ministry reported that 118 Palestinians were killed in Israeli attacks in the past 24 hours, bringing its count of the death toll to 29,313.
- Israel announced that a soldier of the Nahal Brigade was killed the day prior fighting in Gaza, bringing the IDF death toll there to 237.

=== 22 February ===
- The Gaza Health Ministry reported that at least 97 Palestinians were killed in Israeli attacks in the past 24 hours, bringing its count of the death toll to 29,410.
- The Houthis announced a ban on vessels linked to Israel, the United States and United Kingdom from sailing in seas surrounding Yemen.
- At least three people were killed and more injured by Israeli airstrikes on Rafah.
- Sirens were heard in Eilat.
- Israeli settlers attacked the village of Asira al-Qibliya, south of Nablus, wounding a Palestinian man while throwing stones and attempting to set a home on fire.
- Israeli forces killed a Palestinian child in Azzun, east of Qalqilya.
- Local authorities reported that Israeli shelling on residential homes in central Gaza killed at least 40 people.
- One Israeli was killed and eight others were injured when three Palestinian gunmen fired at motorists on Highway 1. The attackers were killed by armed Israeli civilians.
- Chris Lockyear, the director of Doctors Without Borders, spoke to the United Nations Security Council, stating, "There is no health system to speak of left in Gaza. Israel's military has dismantled hospital after hospital. What remains is so little in the face of such carnage".
- The Doctors at al-Shifa reported that conditions were getting "worse and worse, day by day".

=== 23 February ===
- The Gaza Health Ministry reported that 104 Palestinians were killed in Israeli attacks in the past 24 hours, bringing its count of the death toll to 29,514.
- Netanyahu revealed his plans for post-war Gaza, saying that Israel would be able to operate militarily in the area indefinitely to prevent the resurgence of Hamas and adding that the UNRWA must be closed.
- One person was killed and fifteen others were injured when an Israeli bomb targeted a car in Jenin.
- The UNRWA said it could no longer provide services in north Gaza.
- At least 24 people were killed in an Israeli strike on a home hosting displaced people in Deir el-Balah.
- Hezbollah said it attacked several Israeli bases and targeted two buildings where troops had gathered in Metula and Manara.
- An Israeli airstrike hit a vehicle in the Jenin refugee camp, killing at least one person.
- Israeli Finance Minister Bezalel Smotrich said that the country's defence ministry would allow the construction of 3,344 new homes in illegal Israeli settlements.
- Israeli forces demolished two homes, a water well and the electricity network in Khallet al-Farra, south of Hebron.
- The Gaza Health Ministry stated that 350,000 chronic patients, 60,000 pregnant women, and 700,000 children in Gaza were facing severe health complications due to malnutrition, dehydration, and the collapse of the healthcare system.

=== 24 February ===
- The Gaza Health Ministry reported that at least 92 Palestinians were killed in Israeli attacks in the past 24 hours, bringing its count of the death toll to 29,606.
- Israel announced that a Major of the Givati Brigade was killed whilst fighting in the northern Gaza strip, bringing the IDF death toll there to 238.
- The IAF killed at least seven people, including a child in Rafah.

=== 25 February ===
- Israel announced that two soldiers of the Givati Brigade were killed fighting in the southern Gaza strip and three others were seriously injured, bringing the IDF death toll there to 240.
- An Israeli attack targeting a home caused a large fire in Beit Lahia.
- Israeli forces beat eight Palestinians during a raid on Hebron.
- The Gaza Health Ministry reported that at least 86 Palestinians were killed in Israeli attacks in the past 24 hours, bringing its count of the death toll to 29,692.
- A serviceman of the United States Air Force, Aaron Bushnell, set himself on fire in front of the Israeli Embassy in Washington, D.C., to protest against Israel's war in Gaza. He later died because of his injuries.

=== 26 February ===
- The Gaza Health Ministry reported that at least 90 Palestinians were killed in Israeli attacks in the past 24 hours, bringing its count of the death toll to 29,782.
- Palestinian Prime Minister Mohammad Shtayyeh announced his resignation, citing problems brought about by the war, including the "genocide" in Gaza.
- Israel conducted an airstrike in the Lebanese city of Baalbek for the first time since the war began, killing two people according to Hezbollah.

=== 27 February ===
- The Gaza Health Ministry reported that at least 96 Palestinians were killed in Israeli attacks in the past 24 hours, bringing its count of the death toll to 29,878.
- The Jordanian Air Force dropped food aid on the Gaza Strip.
- Protests were held in Tel Aviv against the war and in support of a ceasefire in Gaza.
- Hezbollah conducted 14 attacks primarily targeting Israeli military forces and infrastructure.

=== 28 February ===
- Israel announced that two soldiers of the Givati Brigade were killed and seven others were injured whilst fighting in Gaza the day prior, bringing the IDF death toll there to 242.
- The Gaza Health Ministry reported that at least 76 Palestinians were killed in Israeli attacks in the past 24 hours, bringing its count of the death toll to 29,954.
- Six Palestinian children died of malnutrition in Gaza following warnings that thousands of Palestinians could die of starvation in the near future as a result of the Israeli blockade.

=== 29 February ===
- The Gaza Health Ministry reported that at least 81 Palestinians were killed in Israeli attacks in the past 24 hours, bringing its count of the death toll to 30,035.
- Israeli soldiers opened fire on a crowd, killing at least 118 Palestinians and injuring 760 people waiting for food aid near Al-Rashid Street, south of Gaza City. The IDF admitted to the shootings, claiming it 'fired on Gazans who endangered troops in a stampede', but said it was only responsible for fewer than ten of the deaths. An IDF probe and a local journalist reported that a majority of the deaths were caused by aid trucks which rammed people as they attempted to flee Israeli fire, but Wafa reported that Israeli tanks fired at thousands of people with machine guns.
- New Zealand designated Hamas as a terrorist entity. It also imposed travel bans on extremist Israeli settlers who committed attacks against Palestinians in the West Bank.
- Two Israelis were killed after three attackers, including a Palestinian Authority policeman, opened fire at a gas station near the West Bank settlement of Eli. All three attackers were killed.
- Four Palestinian children died of starvation in the Kamal Adwan hospital in northern Gaza.

== March 2024 ==
=== 1 March ===
- The Gaza Health Ministry reported that 193 Palestinians were killed in Israeli attacks in the past 24 hours, bringing its count of the death toll to 30,228.
- Iranian media reported that an IRGC member was killed in a suspected Israeli attack in Baniyas, Syria.
- Israeli settlers attacked the homes of Palestinians with stones on the outskirts of Jalud, southeast of Nablus.
- The Al-Qassam Brigades said that Israeli bombardment killed seven hostages.
- A Palestinian man was assaulted and detained by Israeli police while trying to pray at the al-Aqsa mosque.

=== 2 March ===
- The Gaza Health Ministry reported that at least 92 Palestinians were killed in Israeli attacks in the past 24 hours, bringing its count of the death toll to 30,320.
- Fifteen people were killed in an Israeli attack on a home in Deir el-Balah, while another eleven were killed in an attack on a tent housing displaced Palestinians near Tal Al-Sultan Hospital in Rafah.
- The MV Rubymar, which was struck by a Houthi anti-ship missile on 18 February, sunk off the coast of Yemen.
- The US conducted a humanitarian aid airdrop in Gaza, dropping 66 pallets containing 38,000 meals.
- Israeli soldiers killed a 16-year-old Palestinian after a raid on the village of Kafr Ni'ma in Ramallah.
- Israel announced that three soldiers of the Bislamach Brigade were killed fighting in southern Gaza, bringing the IDF death toll there to 245.
- A 13-year-old Palestinian child was shot and killed by Israeli forces near the West Bank barrier near Jalazone, West Bank.

=== 3 March ===
- The Gaza Health Ministry reported that at least 90 Palestinians were killed in Israeli attacks in the past 24 hours, bringing its count of the death toll to 30,410.
- At least eight people were killed after the IDF bombed an aid truck in Deir el-Balah.
- An IAF strike on Rafah killed 14 Palestinians, mostly children.
- 55 people were arrested by Israeli forces during overnight raids in several locations across the West Bank.

=== 4 March ===
- The Gaza Health Ministry reported that at least 124 Palestinians were killed in Israeli attacks in the past 24 hours, bringing its count of the death toll to 30,534.
- The Al-Asqa martyrs' brigades detonated an IED that destroyed an IDF bulldozer in Tulkarm and claimed to have injured an Israeli soldier in Ramallah.
- The PIJ launched two rockets from the Gaza Strip into southern Israel.
- Hezbollah claimed that it repelled two Israeli ground operations into southern Lebanon.
- Iran executed an alleged Mossad-affiliated individual for allegedly aiding Israeli sabotage of Iranian defense ministry facilities in January.
- Pro-Houthi media claimed that the US and UK conducted three airstrikes in northern Yemen.
- Unspecified Iranian-backed fighters conducted an anti-tank guided missile attack that killed a foreign farmer and injured seven others near the Israel-Lebanon border.
- After the World Health Organization visited al-Awda and Kamal Adwan hospitals, Tedros Adhanom Ghebreyesus reported "severe levels of malnutrition, children dying of starvation, serious shortages of fuel, food and medical supplies, hospital buildings destroyed".

=== 5 March ===
- The IDF announced that they had completed the destruction of the largest Hamas tunnel found in Gaza after its discovery in December 2023.
- The Gaza Health Ministry reported that at least 97 Palestinians were killed in Israeli attacks in the past 24 hours, bringing its count of the death toll to 30,631.
- Israeli forces bombed a mosque sheltering civilians in Deir el-Balah, killing one Palestinian woman and injuring 20.
- Israeli forces opened fire on Palestinians seeking aid from a supply convoy entering Gaza City.
- An Israeli air strike on a home in Khan Yunis killed at least eight people and injured several more.

=== 6 March ===
- The Barbados-flagged, Greek-owned cargo ship MV True Confidence was hit by a missile near the port of Aden, killing three sailors and injuring four others. The Houthis claimed responsibility for the attack.
- The Gaza Health Ministry reported that at least 86 Palestinians were killed in Israeli attacks in the past 24 hours, bringing its count of the death toll to 30,717.
- Israel announced a soldier of the Oketz Unit was killed fighting in southern Gaza, bringing the IDF death toll there to 247.
- The World Health Organization stated 8,000 wounded people in Gaza needed referrals to receive treatment outside of Gaza.

=== 7 March ===
- The Gaza Health Ministry reported that at least 83 Palestinians were killed in Israeli attacks in the past 24 hours, bringing its count of the death toll to 30,800.
- An Israeli settlement planning authority approved permits for 3,500 new illegal settlement housing units in the occupied West Bank.
- At least five people were killed in an Israeli bombing of a mosque in Jabalia.

=== 8 March ===
- The Gaza Health Ministry reported that at least 78 Palestinians were killed in Israeli attacks in the past 24 hours, bringing its count of the death toll to 30,878.
- Five people were killed in Rafah after they were crushed by airdropped aid packages. and two were killed in Gaza City by faulty air packages.
- Three rockets were fired from Gaza to Sderot.
- Seven Israeli soldiers were wounded by an IED explosion near the Homesh outpost in the West Bank.
- A first cousin of Israeli finance minister Bezalel Smotrich and soldier of the Oz Brigade, Amishar Ben David, was killed fighting in Gaza, bringing the IDF death toll there to 248.
- The middle east eye said that A father and son were found executed by the IDF and left on the street at Farhana School in Khan Yunis.

=== 9 March ===
- The Gaza Health Ministry reported that at least 82 Palestinians were killed in Israeli attacks in the past 24 hours, bringing its count of the death toll to 30,960.
- IAF airdrops booklets in Southern Gaza blaming Hamas for the humanitarian crisis.
- A group of settlers wounded two Palestinians, including an elderly man in Masafer Yatta, and attempted to set a house on fire in Burqa.
- At least 20 people were killed in Israeli attacks on residential buildings in central and southern Gaza, with many more wounded and missing under the rubble.
- Israeli forces infrastructure and prompted clashes during raids in the Nur Shams camp near Tulkarm.
- The US military support ship USAV General Frank S. Besson Jr. departed from Virginia for the Middle East, carrying supplies to construct a temporary pier off the coast of Gaza.
- A pro-Netanyahu rally was held in Tel Aviv where demonstrators advocated for the total burning of Gaza.
- The World Health Organization delivered trauma supplies and fuel to Al Ahli hospital, which had been operating at 30% capacity and functioning on solar power.
- WHO chief Tedros Adhanom Ghebreyesus stated, "Almost 31,000 people have lost their lives, 72,000+ have been injured, and thousands are missing. 406 attacks on health care, 118 health workers are in detention, and 1 in 3 hospitals is only partially or minimally functional. When is enough enough?"

=== 10 March ===
- The Gaza Health Ministry reported that at least 85 Palestinians were killed in Israeli attacks in the past 24 hours, bringing its count of the death toll to 31,045.
- 15 people were killed by Israeli attacks in the Nuseirat refugee camp and the al-Mawasi area.
- Two people, including an infant, died of malnutrition in northern Gaza.
- At least 13 Palestinians seeking refuge in Khan Yunis were killed by Israeli shelling on their tents.
- Five people were killed in attacks on Deir el-Balah, including an aid worker from a US charity.
- An Israeli strike killed a family of five and injured nine other people in a village in southern Lebanon near the border.
- A group of Israeli settlers installed a mobile home on Palestinian land in Sinjil, north of Ramallah.
- In Masafer Yatta, Israeli soldiers seized a tractor and chased Palestinian farmers and shepherds off their pasture as they attempted to reclaim occupied land.
- Israeli settlers destroyed tombstones in the Bab al-Rahma Cemetery, adjacent to Al-Aqsa Mosque in Jerusalem.
- Israeli forces assaulted Muslim worshippers in Al-Asqa Mosque, arresting 20 people.
- The IDF carried out a "massacre" in the Al Mawasi area of Khan Yunis, killing the Abdul Ghafour family and their animals.
- An overnight Israeli airstrike targeting a building in Nuseirat refugee camp reportedly killed five Palestinians in an attempt to assassinate Hamas third-in-command Marwan Issa.
- The Al-Aqsa Martyrs Hospital reported that they could not accept new patients due to a lack of medical supplies, stating they could no longer provide quality care.

=== 11 March ===
- The Gaza Health Ministry reported that at least 67 Palestinians were killed in Israeli attacks in the past 24 hours, bringing its count of the death toll to 31,112.
- Mohammed Barakat, who played for the Palestine national football team, was killed in an Israeli airstrike in Khan Yunis.
- Three Palestinians who had set up a cell linked to the Al-Aqsa Martyrs Brigades in L'Aquila, Italy were arrested for planning attacks in an unspecified country.
- An Israeli airstrike on a house in Gaza City killed 16 people and injured several others.
- Israeli forces bombed a home belonging to the Ashour family in the Tal al-Hawa neighbourhood, killing at least 10 people.
- Israeli forces prevented hundreds of Muslim worshippers from entering Al-Aqsa Mosque for prayers to mark the start of Ramadan.
- The non-profit charity organization SOS Children's Villages evacuated 68 children and 11 employees and members of their families from Rafah to the Israeli-occupied West Bank.
- Israeli forces shot and killed two people north of Tulkarm, accusing one of them of being armed and planning to carry out an attack.
- UNOCHA reported that 2 hospitals namely al-Ahli Hospital and the Sahaba Hospital in Gaza City were overwhelmed by structural damage, understaffing, and being undersupplied.
- The Gaza Health Ministry stated that 2,000 of its medical staff in northern Gaza faced starvation due to famine.
- Diabetic patients reported difficulty finding and receiving dialysis treatment due to shortages of supplies and staff.

=== 12 March ===
- The Gaza Health Ministry reported that at least 72 Palestinians were killed in Israeli attacks in the past 24 hours, bringing its count of the death toll to 31,184.
- Israeli forces attacked Palestinians waiting for aid trucks at the Kuwait Roundabout south of Gaza City, killing seven people.
- The Houthis fired two antiship ballistic missiles at the Singaporean-owned and Liberian-flagged ship Pinocchio.
- The IDF shot and killed two Palestinian men near Attil, north of Tulkarem.

=== 13 March ===
- The Gaza Health Ministry reported that at least 88 Palestinians were killed in Israeli attacks in the past 24 hours, bringing its count of the death toll to 31,272.
- An Israeli attack on a UN aid distribution center in Rafah killed five people including a UN staffer, and wounded 22 people.
- Israeli forces killed three people in separate incidents in the West Bank, including a Palestinian who was suspected of a stabbing attack at a military checkpoint which wounded two personnel.
- A 13-year-old Palestinian boy was shot dead by Israeli troops in East Jerusalem.
- The IDF launched air attacks throughout the Gaza Strip, killing and wounding dozens, including ten people in Deir el-Balah.
- Hezbollah said two of its fighters were killed by Israeli airstrikes in the Bekaa Valley.
- Israeli forces stormed the Jenin Government Hospital, shooting and killing one Palestinian man and wounding five.
- An Israeli drone strike in southwestern Lebanon killed a Hamas member and another person.

=== 14 March ===
- The Gaza Health Ministry reported that at least 69 Palestinians were killed in Israeli attacks in the past 24 hours, bringing its count of the death toll to 31,341.
- An Israeli attack on aid seekers in Gaza City killed twenty people and injured 155 others, according to the Gaza Health Ministry.
- A Fatah secretary and another person was arrested during an Israeli raid in Abu Dis.
- The US imposed sanctions on two Israeli outposts in the West Bank and three Israeli settlers.
- A non-commissioned IDF soldier was killed and three others were wounded during a stabbing attack at a gas station in Beit Kama. The assailant was fatally shot by the victim.
- In Gaza, the IDF opened fire on a bicycle which it mistook to be an RPG, killing two Palestinians.

=== 15 March ===
- The Gaza Health Ministry reported that at least 149 Palestinians were killed in Israeli attacks in the past 24 hours, bringing its count of the death toll to 31,490.
- The private aid ship Open Arms arrived off the coast of Gaza carrying 200 tons of food after departing from Cyprus.
- Hamas unveiled a new proposal aimed at ending the war.
- Israeli strikes killed at least 29 people waiting for aid during two attacks on Gaza.
- Israeli settlers carried out attacks in the occupied West Bank, setting a car on fire and raiding a school.

=== 16 March ===
- The Gaza Health Ministry reported that at least 63 Palestinians were killed in Israeli attacks in the past 24 hours, bringing its count of the death toll to 31,553.
- At least 36 Palestinians were killed in an overnight Israeli airstrike on a residential building in the Nuseirat camp.
- Israeli settlers assaulted Palestinian farmers and shepherds in Masafer Yatta, preventing access to their grazing fields. A 14-year-old Palestinian boy was injured in the attack.
- Israeli soldiers shot and killed a Palestinian man who was reportedly affiliated with Hamas after he opened fire at an Israeli settlement in Hebron.
- The head of the International Federation of Red Cross and Red Crescent Societies stated, "The healthcare situation is on the brink of collapse with hospitals facing desperate conditions".

=== 17 March ===
- The Gaza Health Ministry reported that at least 92 Palestinians were killed in Israeli attacks in the past 24 hours, bringing its count of the death toll to 31,645.
- At least 12 people were killed and others were wounded during Israeli attacks in Deir-el-Balah.

=== 18 March ===
- The Gaza Health Ministry reported that at least 81 Palestinians were killed in Israeli attacks in the past 24 hours, bringing its count of the death toll to 31,726.
- The IDF conducted an overnight raid into al-Shifa Hospital, saying that senior Hamas leaders had regrouped inside the facility and were using it to launch attacks. According to the IDF, one Israeli soldier was killed, while 20 Palestinian gunmen were killed, including senior Hamas operative Faiq Mabhouh, and dozens were apprehended during clashes within the area of the hospital.
- Israel announced that a soldier of the Nahal Brigade was killed fighting in the northern Gaza strip, bringing the IDF death toll there to 250.
- The Islamic Resistance in Iraq said that it launched a drone attack at an Israeli airbase in the occupied Golan Heights.
- The IDF shelled a house in Jabalia, killing at least eight Palestinians, including children.
- Israeli airstrikes in Rafah killed five senior Hamas operatives.

=== 19 March ===
- The Gaza Health Ministry reported that at least 93 Palestinians were killed in Israeli attacks in the past 24 hours, bringing its count of the death toll to 31,819.
- Israel announced that a soldier of the 401st Brigade was killed fighting in northern Gaza, bringing the IDF death toll there to 251.
- The Gaza Health Ministry said that 20 Palestinians were killed by Israeli airstrikes in Rafah and central Gaza.
- At least six people were killed in an Israeli attack on a house in the Nuseirat refugee camp.

=== 20 March ===
- The Gaza Health Ministry reported that at least 104 Palestinians were killed in Israeli attacks in the past 24 hours, bringing its count of the death toll to 31,923.
- The IDF confirmed that a Houthi missile entered Israeli airspace for the first time and landed near Eilat.
- The IDF said it killed 90 gunmen and arrested 160 as it continued operations in Al-Shifa hospital.
- An Israeli airstrike on a car in Jenin killed three Palestinians and wounded one. Israel later claimed that they were militants planning to lead an attack.
- A small group of Israeli protesters picketed outside the UNRWA office in occupied East Jerusalem, calling for it to be disbanded.
- Two Palestinian men were killed by an Israeli drone strike at the Nur Shams refugee camp.
- Shin Bet and Israeli Border Police arrested 34 people wanted throughout the West Bank.

=== 21 March ===
- The Gaza Health Ministry reported that at least 65 Palestinians were killed in Israeli attacks in the past 24 hours, bringing its count of the death toll to 31,988.
- The US submitted a draft resolution to the UNSC calling for an immediate ceasefire and the release of Israeli hostages.
- The IDF announced the killing of 50 gunmen in Al-Shifa Hospital, bringing the total amount of Hamas fighters reportedly killed at the complex to 140.
- A Palestinian convert to Judaism was fatally shot by Israeli soldiers in Elazar. The IDF ordered a criminal probe in response to the killing. Ten people were killed by Israeli forces during separate incidents in the West Bank.
- The Islamic Resistance in Iraq said it targeted a power plant in Tel Aviv with a drone.

=== 22 March ===
- The Gaza Health Ministry reported that at least 82 Palestinians were killed in Israeli attacks in the past 24 hours, bringing its count of the death toll to 32,070.
- Seven people were wounded during clashes with a Palestinian gunman near Dolev. The gunman was killed by an Israeli airstrike.
- An Israeli airstrike on a residential building in northwest Gaza City killed ten people. Four people were also killed by Israeli airstrikes in Khan Yunis.
- Air strikes on residential homes in the Nasser neighbourhood north of Gaza city killed at least eight people.
- A Palestinian was killed and at least seven Israeli soldiers were injured in fighting near Deir Bzayeh, west of Ramallah.
- Far-right Israeli finance Minister Bezalel Smotrich declared that Israel had appropriated 800 hectares (1,977 acres) of the occupied West Bank as "state land".
- A US-sponsored resolution in the UN Security Council was vetoed by Russia and China; Algeria also voted against and Guyana abstained. The draft was criticized for failing to call explicitly for a ceasefire, for implying that any ceasefire was conditional on a prior release of hostages, and for the deletion of a statement present in an earlier version that had expressed clear opposition to a ground offensive in Rafah.

=== 23 March ===
- The Gaza Health Ministry reported that at least 72 Palestinians were killed in Israeli attacks in the past 24 hours, bringing its count of the death toll to 32,142.
- At least three patients died in the Al-Shifa hospital from a lack of medical supplies. Hamas and the PIJ said their fighters clashed with Israeli forces around the complex, while Israel updated the death toll of Palestinian gunmen at the hospital to 170.
- At least 10 people were killed by shelling on a family home northwest of Gaza City. Three people were also killed by targeted missile attacks that hit az-Zanna neighbourhood in Khan Yunis.
- Hamas said that an Israeli hostage died from a lack of medicine and malnutrition.
- The Gaza health ministry claimed that 19 Palestinians were killed and 23 injured after Israeli forces opened fire on a crowd of people waiting for aid trucks in the Zaytoun neighborhood.
- A Houthi ballistic missile struck a Chinese-owned oil tanker near Yemen.

=== 24 March ===
- The Gaza Health Ministry reported that at least 84 Palestinians were killed in Israeli attacks in the past 24 hours, bringing its count of the death toll to 32,226.
- Israel announced a soldier of the Nahal Brigade was killed fighting in Gaza, bringing the IDF death toll there to 252.
- The Palestinian Red Crescent said that one of its staff members were killed after Israeli tanks besieged the area around the Al-Amal and Nasser hospitals.
- Three people were wounded by Israeli air strikes on Baalbek.
- Israeli air strikes in Rafah and Deir el-Balah killed at least 14 Palestinians.

=== 25 March ===
- The Gaza Health Ministry reported that at least 107 Palestinians were killed in Israeli attacks in the past 24 hours, bringing its count of the death toll to 32,333.
- An Algerian-sponsored resolution in the UN Security Council calling for a ceasefire in Gaza was passed with 14 members in support and the US abstaining.
- Israeli settlers assaulted several Palestinians and attacked homes and vehicles in Beit Ummar, north of Hebron.
- The British Royal Air Force airdropped more than 10 metric tons of food supplies into the Gaza Strip for the first time since the war began.

=== 26 March ===
- At least 15 people, including 14 IRGC members, were killed in suspected Israeli airstrikes on a military garrison and other targets in Deir ez-Zor, Syria.
- The Gaza Health Ministry reported that at least 81 Palestinians were killed in Israeli attacks in the past 24 hours, bringing its count of the death toll to 32,414.
- The IAF bombed a house in Rafah, killing at least 15 people.
- Hundreds of Palestinians marched in the Nur Shams refugee camp against the war on Gaza and IDF incursions in the West Bank.
- A Palestinian man drowned while trying to collect aid that fell to the sea off the coast of northern Gaza.

=== 27 March ===
- The Gaza Health Ministry reported that at least 76 Palestinians were killed in Israeli attacks in the past 24 hours, bringing its count of the death toll to 32,490.
- Hezbollah claimed that it launched dozens of rockets at Kiryat Shmona in response to Israeli bombing on al-Habbariyeh that killed seven people.
- Two Palestinians were killed and nine people were injured by an Israeli drone strike on the Jenin refugee camp, Israeli forces also fatally shot a 19-year-old during a raid into Jenin.
- The Spanish air force dropped tons of aid to the Gaza Strip. The Spanish foreign ministry later called on Israel to open land border crossings to prevent a famine.

=== 28 March ===
- The Gaza Health Ministry reported that at least 62 Palestinians were killed in Israeli attacks in the past 24 hours, bringing its count of the death toll to 32,552.
- Gunfire was reported at Nasser Hospital, and clashes took place around Al-Shifa Hospital, where Israel updated the death toll of Palestinian gunmen to around 200.
- Eight Palestinians were killed during an Israeli airstrike on a house in the Maghazi refugee camp.
- Israeli soldiers shot and killed two Palestinian men who were walking along the Gaza coast and then buried by an Israeli bulldozer.

=== 29 March ===
- The Gaza Health Ministry reported that at least 71 Palestinians were killed in Israeli attacks in the past 24 hours, bringing its count of the death toll to 32,623.
- At least 52 people were killed, including 38 Syrian Arab Army soldiers, seven Hezbollah fighters and seven Pro-Assad militiamen in an Israeli airstrike on a Hezbollah weapons depot in the Jabrin area of Aleppo.
- Israel banned Palestinian Christians from entering Jerusalem's Old City during Easter.
- An Israeli soldier of the Egoz commando unit was killed and 16 others were wounded when a Hamas militant fired an RPG at the building they were in near Nasser Hospital, raising the IDF death toll to 254.
- Israeli airstrikes hit the Saad bin Abi Waqqas Mosque in the Jabalia refugee camp, injuring two Palestinians.

=== 30 March ===
- The Gaza Health Ministry reported that at least 82 Palestinians were killed in Israeli attacks in the past 24 hours, bringing its count of the death toll to 32,705.
- The US authorized the transfer of US$2.5 billion in weapons and warplanes to Israel.
- In Qabatiya, south of Jenin, Israeli forces killed a 13-year-old Palestinian boy and injured several other young people during a raid.
- An Israeli airstrike on a sport centre in Gaza City killed 15 Palestinians. Another airstrike on a police station in Shujaiya killed at least 17 Palestinians.

=== 31 March ===
- The Gaza Health Ministry reported that at least 77 Palestinians were killed in Israeli attacks in the past 24 hours, bringing its count of the death toll to 32,782.
- The Islamic Resistance in Iraq claimed to have launched a drone strike at Eilabun.
- At least four Palestinians were injured in an attack by Israeli forces on Rashayida, north of Jericho.
- At least four people were killed and 18 injured during an Israeli airstrike on the courtyard of the Al-Aqsa Martyrs Hospital.

== April 2024 ==
=== 1 April ===
- Israel announced that a soldier of the 7th Armoured Brigade was killed fighting in southern Gaza, bringing the IDF death toll there to 256.
- The IDF withdrew from the al-Shifa hospital. The World Health Organization said 21 patients died throughout the operation.
- The Gaza Health Ministry reported that at least 63 Palestinians were killed in Israeli attacks in the past 24 hours, bringing its count of the death toll to 32,845.
- A drone from Iraq struck a hangar in the Eilat naval base, causing slight damage.
- The Iranian embassy in Damascus, Syria was struck by a missile, killing at least seven people, including IRGC Brig. Gen. Mohammad Reza Zahedi. Syrian and Iranian officials blamed Israel for the attack.
- Israeli officials agreed to acknowledge US concerns about the planned Rafah offensive.
- An Israeli strike on a vehicle in Deir al-Balah killed four World Central Kitchen aid workers from Australia, Britain, Ireland, and Poland along with their Palestinian driver.
- An Israeli helicopter pilot accidentally pressed the wrong button and shot towards Israeli soldiers inside the Gaza Strip, nearly hitting them.

=== 2 April ===
- The Gaza Health Ministry reported that at least 71 Palestinians were killed in Israeli attacks in the past 24 hours, bringing its count of the death toll to 32,916.

=== 3 April ===
- The Gaza Health Ministry reported that at least 59 Palestinians were killed in Israeli attacks in the past 24 hours, bringing its count of the death toll to 32,975.
- A resident of Arab-Israeli town Tira performed a car ramming and attempted stabbing west of Qalqilya injuring four Israeli soldiers.

=== 4 April ===
- The Gaza Health Ministry reported that at least 62 Palestinians were killed in Israeli attacks in the past 24 hours, bringing its count of the death toll to 33,037.
- Israeli soldiers shot dead a 28-year-old Palestinian man during a house raid in Ya'bad, West Bank.
- The Shin Bet announced the arrests of seven Arab Israelis and four Palestinians, including at least one in contact with Hamas, who planned to carry out a wave of attacks against IDF bases, government complexes, and other sensitive sites in Israel and the West Bank, including an assassination of Israeli National Security Minister Itamar Ben-Gvir.
- At least eight Palestinians were killed by Israeli bombings on houses in Rafah. Two people were killed and 15 injured by an Israeli airstrike in the Maghazi refugee camp.
- Ambulances were temporarily blocked from reaching two Palestinians that were injured by live bullets as Israeli forces raided Kafr Ra'i, southwest of Jenin.

=== 5 April ===
- A 31-year-old Palestinian man was shot and killed by an Israeli sniper during a raid in Nur Shams, West Bank. Two other Palestinian men were arrested.
- The Gaza Health Ministry reported that at least 54 Palestinians were killed in Israeli attacks in the past 24 hours, bringing its count of the death toll to 33,091.
- Israel agreed to open the Erez Crossing and the Port of Ashdod to allow an increased amount of humanitarian aid into Gaza.
- An Israeli soldier shot and killed a Palestinian man who tried to collect aid in northern Gaza.
- The IDF sacked two officers over the strikes on the World Central Kitchen convoy on 1 April.

=== 6 April ===
- The Gaza Health Ministry reported that at least 46 Palestinians were killed in Israeli attacks in the past 24 hours, bringing its count of the death toll to 33,137.
- An Israeli air raid on a house in southern Lebanon killed three members of the Amal Movement.
- An Israeli investigation found that one Israeli hostage was "most likely" killed when an Israeli helicopter fired on her captors' car.

=== 7 April ===
- Israel announced that four soldiers of the Egoz were killed by Hamas in a tunnel ambush in southern Gaza the day prior, raising the IDF death toll to 260.
- The Gaza Health Ministry reported that at least 38 Palestinians were killed in Israeli attacks in the past 24 hours, bringing its count of the death toll to 33,175.
- Israeli forces withdrew from the western parts of Khan Yunis, leaving the Nahal Brigade as the only Israeli brigade stationed in Gaza.
- A young Palestinian man died after being shot in the head by Israeli forces during a raid in Ramallah.
- Five rockets were fired from Khan Yunis at communities in southern Israel.
- The IDF announced that it uncovered and destroyed a 900-meter-long tunnel in Al-Amal neighborhood, Khan Yunis.
- Two people were wounded during a shooting in the West Bank.
- At least 23 Palestinians were arrested by Israeli forces during raids in Hebron Governorate.

=== 8 April ===
- Three people including a fighter of Hezbollah's Redwan Force were killed in an Israeli airstrike on as-Sultaniyah village in southern Lebanon.
- Israeli forces shot and killed a Palestinian woman at a checkpoint in the occupied West Bank, after she allegedly tried to stab Israeli soldiers.
- The Gaza Health Ministry reported that at least 32 Palestinians were killed in Israeli attacks in the past 24 hours, bringing its count of the death toll to 33,207.
- Following the Israeli withdrawal, at least 84 bodies of dead Palestinians were retrieved by Palestinian paramedics from underneath the rubble of destroyed buildings in Khan Yunis.

=== 9 April ===
- The Gaza Health Ministry reported that at least 153 Palestinians were killed in Israeli attacks in the past 24 hours, bringing its count of the death toll to 33,360.
- Turkey imposed export restrictions on 54 products from Israel, which it said would take place until a ceasefire is reached.
- Israel said it killed Hamas' governmental Emergency Committee Chairman Hatem al-Am'ari while he was in a refugee camp.
- The INS Magen intercepted a drone that entered Israeli airspace near Eilat.
- An Israeli airstrike in Nuseirat camp killed 14 Palestinians, including four children.
- UNOCHA stated Israel denied approval for their convoy to provide medical care to a man shot in the head, and that he died after more than two hours without medical treatment.

=== 10 April ===
- The Gaza Health Ministry reported that at least 122 Palestinians were killed in Israeli attacks in the past 24 hours, bringing its count of the death toll to 33,482.
- Three sons and four grandchildren of Hamas leader Ismail Haniyeh were killed by an Israeli airstrike near the Shati refugee camp. Israel claimed that the sons were Hamas operatives.
- Irish foreign minister Micheál Martin stated to local media The Journal that Ireland will move to recognize a Palestinian state in "the next couple of weeks."

=== 11 April ===
- The Gaza Health Ministry reported that at least 63 Palestinians were killed in Israeli attacks in the past 24 hours, bringing its count of the death toll to 33,545.
- Israeli airstrikes in Jabalia killed two senior Hamas members.
- A Palestinian man was killed and two others were injured during Israeli raids in the West Bank.

=== 12 April ===
- The Gaza Health Ministry reported that at least 89 Palestinians were killed in Israeli attacks in the past 24 hours, bringing its count of the death toll to 33,634.
- At least 29 Palestinians were killed in an Israeli airstrike on a building in Gaza City's Daraj neighbourhood.
- Israeli forces shot and killed two Palestinian men during a raid in Tubas and the nearby refugee camp of Farah, West Bank, including the son of a Hamas member who died in Israeli custody.
- Australia, Canada, France, India, Poland, and Russia issued warnings to their citizens advising against travel to Israel, the Palestinian territories, and some countries in the Middle East. The US also announced restrictions on its diplomats traveling in Israel.
- The EU imposed sanctions on the armed wings of Hamas and the PIJ over their sexual and gender-based violence during 7 October.
- Hundreds of armed Israeli settlers stormed al-Mughayyir, Ramallah, killing a Palestinian man and wounding at least 25, as well as setting houses ablaze. The attack occurred as Israeli forces searched for a missing 14-year-old boy who was last seen around 2 kilometres (1.2 mi) from the village.
- Israeli forces targeted the minaret of the Al-Qassam Mosque in Nuseirat Camp during the Islamic call of prayer.

=== 13 April ===
- The Gaza Health Ministry reported that at least 52 Palestinians were killed in Israeli attacks in the past 24 hours, bringing its count of the death toll to 33,686.
- The IRGC Navy seized the Portuguese-flagged and Israel-linked MSC Aries off the coast of the UAE, claiming it had violated maritime laws.
- The IDF found the body of the teen whose disappearance sparked the attack in al-Mughayyir, who they said died in a terrorist attack.
- An Israeli attack on the Zarqa area of Gaza City killed five people and injured more than 30.
- Israel announced restrictions prohibiting educational activities and gatherings of up to 1,000 people due to threats of an Iranian attack.
- Iran launched dozens of drones carrying explosives towards Israel.
- The al Aqsa Martyrs' Brigades attacked an IDF checkpoint, an illegal Israeli settlement near Tulkarm, and an Israeli town on the West Bank border in retaliation for settler violence in the West Bank.

=== 14 April ===
- The Gaza Health Ministry reported that at least 43 Palestinians were killed in Israeli attacks in the past 24 hours, bringing its count of the death toll to 33,729.
- Israel's plan to initiate its first steps in a ground offensive in Rafah during the week was postponed to consider its response to the Iranian strikes on Israel.
- Israeli forces conducted an air raid near the European Hospital south of Khan Yunis, injuring five people.
- Israeli settlers uprooted 30 olive trees and some almond trees in Qarawat Bani Hassan, west of Salfit.

=== 15 April ===
- The Gaza Health Ministry reported that at least 68 Palestinians were killed in Israeli attacks in the past 24 hours, bringing the Palestinian death toll to 33,797.
- A Palestinian man was shot dead by undercover Israeli forces in Nablus.
- Israeli forces fatally shot a young girl in the face during an attempt by some displaced Palestinian civilians to return to northern Gaza.
- The Gaza health ministry and Palestinian Civil Defence Forces discovered two mass graves, one at the Al-Shifa hospital and one in Beit Lahia.
- An Israeli airstrike hit a house west of Rafah, killing four people including a child.
- IDF vehicles surrounded a school where civilians had taken shelter in Beit Hanoun.

=== 16 April ===
- The Gaza Health Ministry reported that at least 46 Palestinians were killed in Israeli attacks in the past 24 hours, bringing the Palestinian death toll to 33,843.
- An Israeli attack in Gaza City killed seven Palestinian law enforcement officials and two bystanders.
- Israeli attacks on homes in Rafah, Maghazi and Gaza City killed more than 20 people.
- An IDF bulldozer was caught in a large explosion in Tubas.
- Fighters of the Palestinian Mujahideen Movement detonated an IED that targeted Israeli troops in the Al Askar refugee camp in the West Bank.

=== 17 April ===
- The Gaza Health Ministry reported that at least 56 Palestinians were killed in Israeli attacks in the past 24 hours, bringing the Palestinian death toll to 33,899.
- Israeli airstrikes hit a playground and a busy market in the Maghazi refugee camp.
- Hezbollah launched missile and drones strikes into northern Israel, wounding 14 soldiers and 4 civilians. One of the wounded soldiers died of his injuries four days later. An Israeli counter-battery radar on Mount Meron was destroyed in one of the attacks.

=== 18 April ===
- The Gaza Health Ministry reported that at least 71 Palestinians were killed in Israeli attacks in the past 24 hours, bringing the Palestinian death toll to 33,970.
- Israeli airstrikes in Rafah killed 11 people including five children.
- The US imposed sanctions on Iran, targeting 16 people and seven companies, including two linked to the production of drones.
- The US vetoed a UN Security Council resolution for Palestine to gain full membership at the UN, 12 countries approved while two abstained.

=== 19 April ===
- The Gaza Health Ministry reported that at least 42 Palestinians were killed in Israeli attacks in the past 24 hours, bringing the Palestinian death toll to 34,012.
- Israel launched drones into Iran's Isfahan province.
- The EU imposed sanctions against four people and two entities over violence by Israeli settlers in the West Bank.
- Between 18 and 19 April, at least five Palestinians were killed by Israeli forces during an Israeli raid in Tulkarm, including a 16-year-old boy, and a senior Islamic Jihad terrorist.
- Barbados officially recognizes the State of Palestine.

=== 20 April ===
- The Gaza Health Ministry reported that at least 37 Palestinians were killed in Israeli attacks in the past 24 hours, bringing the Palestinian death toll to 34,049.
- Israeli airstrikes on Rafah killed at least 10 people, mostly women and children.
- A 50-year-old Palestinian medic was shot dead by armed Israeli settlers in the village of As-Sawiya, West Bank.
- Nine Palestinians were killed on the third day of an Israeli raid in Tulkarm, bringing the total to 14 Palestinians killed since 18 April.
- The US House of Representatives passed an aid package that would provide Israel with US$17 billion in military aid and Gaza with around US$2 billion in humanitarian aid.

=== 21 April ===
- The Gaza Health Ministry reported that at least 48 Palestinians were killed in Israeli attacks in the past 24 hours, bringing the Palestinian death toll to 34,097.
- Emergency services in Gaza and Palestinian Civil Defence crews uncovered a mass grave at the Nasser Medical Complex in Khan Yunis and recovered at least 310 bodies as of 23 April.
- A pregnant woman and six children were among eight people killed by waves of Israeli strikes on Rafah, doctors managed to save the unborn child.
- Rockets were launched from the Iraqi town of Zummar towards a US base, the Rumaylan Landing Zone, in northwest Syria, in the first such attack by Iraqi groups since February.
- An Israeli settler from Hashahar settlement in the West Bank kicked a Palestinian flag unknowingly rigged with explosives, injuring him.

=== 22 April ===
- The Gaza Health Ministry reported that at least 54 Palestinians were killed in Israeli attacks in the past 24 hours, bringing the Palestinian death toll to 34,151.
- The head of IDF Intelligence, Major General Aharon Haliva announced that he would retire from his position and take responsibility for Israel's failures leading up to the 7 October attacks.
- Kata'ib Hezbollah announced that Iraqi armed groups had decided to resume their attacks on US bases in Iraq and Syria after seeing little progress on talks to achieve the exit of American troops during the Iraqi prime minister's visit to Washington, D.C.

=== 23 April ===
- The Gaza Health Ministry reported that at least 32 Palestinians were killed in Israeli attacks in the past 24 hours, bringing the Palestinian death toll to 34,183.
- Israel announced that a soldier of the Gaza Division was killed fighting the day prior in the northern Gaza strip, bringing the IDF death toll there to 261.
- Hezbollah claimed that it launched drone attacks on Israeli bases north of Acre in retaliation for the killing of one of its fighters in southern Lebanon.
- Two people were killed and four others were injured after an Israeli airstrike destroyed a residential house in the village of Hanine, in southern Lebanon.
- Jamaica officially recognized the State of Palestine.

=== 24 April ===
- The Gaza Health Ministry reported that at least 79 Palestinians were killed in Israeli attacks in the past 24 hours, bringing the Palestinian death toll to 34,262.
- Israeli airstrikes on the home of the Hamid family near Shati refugee camp killed a mother and her 12-year-old son.
- Israeli forces shelled a house in the Nassr neighbourhood of Gaza City, killing least three people and injuring more.
- Israeli strikes on the Ma'an and al-Mawasi areas in Khan Yunis killed two people.
- An anti-aircraft missile fell near Yaron on the Lebanese border, causing a small fire.
- Gazan militants fired mortar rounds at Israeli forces assisting in preparations for the US-led project to construct a humanitarian aid pier off the coast of Gaza. No damage was caused.
- The director of the Kuwaiti hospital in Rafah stated, "Rafah governorate has become a continuous target... The Israeli occupation uses internationally prohibited weapons, and the type of injuries we receive is unprecedented, such as amputation of limbs and laceration of the body".

=== 25 April ===
- The Gaza Health Ministry reported that at least 43 Palestinians were killed in Israeli attacks in the past 24 hours, bringing the Palestinian death toll to 34,305.
- Officials in Gaza claimed that some of the 392 bodies recovered from mass graves in Al-Shifa and Nasser hospitals showed signs of "torture and execution".
- The IDF announced the withdrawal of the Nahal Brigade from the Gaza Strip.

=== 26 April ===
- The Gaza Health Ministry reported that at least 51 Palestinians were killed in Israeli attacks in the past 24 hours, bringing the Palestinian death toll to 34,356.
- The al Aqsa Martyrs' Brigades detonated IEDs and clashed with Israeli forces during their operation at the Balata refugee camp in Nablus.
- The Palestinian Mujahideen Movement launched rockets from Gaza targeting Sderot.

=== 27 April ===
- The Gaza Health Ministry reported that at least 32 Palestinians were killed in Israeli attacks in the past 24 hours, bringing the Palestinian death toll to 34,388.
- The sole Catholic priest in the Gaza Strip, Gabriel Romanelli, reported that at least 33 Christians were killed since the start of the war, which is three percent of the total Christian population in the Strip.
- Israeli forces opened fire on people at the Salem checkpoint west of Jenin, killing two Palestinian men and injuring two others.
- An Israeli bombing on the Sultan neighborhood of the Nuseirat camp killed four people including a baby girl. Four other people were killed and at least 30 were injured by a strike on another house on the same camp.
- Israeli strikes on the Saudi neighborhood west of Rafah killed five people including two children.
- A Houthi missile hit and damaged the British-owned Oil-Tanker MV Andromeda Star and downed a US MQ-9 Reaper drone.

=== 28 April ===
- The Gaza Health Ministry reported that at least 66 Palestinians were killed in Israeli attacks in the past 24 hours, bringing the Palestinian death toll to 34,454.
- More than 270 Israeli settlers entered the Al-Asqa compound with IDF protection.

=== 29 April ===
- The Gaza Health Ministry reported that at least 34 Palestinians were killed in Israeli attacks in the past 24 hours, bringing the Palestinian death toll to 34,488.
- At least 20 Palestinians were killed in strikes in Rafah and four Palestinians were killed in strikes in Gaza City.
- Israel announced that a soldier of the Yiftach Brigade and a soldier of the Carmeli Brigade were killed the day prior fighting in central Gaza, bringing the IDF death toll there to 263.

=== 30 April ===
- The Gaza Health Ministry reported that at least 47 Palestinians were killed in Israeli attacks in the past 24 hours, bringing the Palestinian death toll to 34,535.
- The Palestinian Civil Defence stated that over 10,000 missing bodies were buried under rubble inside the Gaza Strip, causing disease outbreaks and epidemics across the strip.
- A 34-year-old Turkish man was shot dead by Israeli forces in Jerusalem's Old City after attempting to stab an Israeli police officer.
- An Israeli attack on al-Zahra in central Gaza killed at least two people.
- Israeli forces assaulted and killed a Palestinian man in Ad-Dhahiriya, southwest of Hebron.

== May 2024 ==
=== 1 May ===
- The Gaza Health Ministry reported that at least 33 Palestinians were killed in Israeli attacks in the past 24 hours, bringing the Palestinian death toll to 34,568.
- An overnight Israeli airstrike on a house in Rafah killed two children.
- Two Jordanian aid convoys were attacked by Israeli settlers while on their way to Gaza. Israeli settlers also blocked humanitarian aid trucks heading towards Gaza from Ashdod Port.
- Israeli forces raided the village of Berin, east of Hebron, where they demolished a Palestinian family home and a water well.
- One person was killed after Israeli forces opened fire on al-Rashid street near the Wadi Gaza checkpoint.
- The Islamic Resistance in Iraq claimed two drone strikes targeting "vital targets" in the occupied Golan Heights and Eilat.

=== 2 May ===
- The Gaza Health Ministry reported that at least 28 Palestinians were killed in Israeli attacks in the past 24 hours, bringing the Palestinian death toll to 34,596.
- A 58-year-old Israeli man was arrested for trying to attack Netanyahu's convoy in Tel Aviv.
- An Israeli airstrike on a group of people in Bureij camp killed five people, including a child.
- Iran announced sanctions on several American and British individuals and entities for their support on Israel in its war on Gaza.
- Israeli shelled agricultural land in the north of Nuseirat refugee camp, injuring at least 10 people.
- The IAF bombed a residential building in the Zeitoun neighbourhood near Gaza City, killing at least two civilians.
- Israeli forces struck the city of az-Zahra, north of Nuseirat camp, killing at least six people. It also targeted the Qaa al-Qurain, Bani Suheila, Abasan al-Kabira and Khuza'a neighborhoods in Khan Yunis, killing one civilian and injuring more.
- Turkey suspended trade with Israel due to the humanitarian situation in Gaza.
- Colombian president Gustavo Petro announced the cutting of diplomatic ties with Israel over its war on Gaza
- The Islamic resistance in Iraq claimed a two long ranged missile attack targeting Beer Sheva and Tel Aviv.
- The Iran-backed Bahraini group Al-Ashtar Brigades claimed a strike that targeted the headquarters of the Israeli transportation company Trucknet Enterprise in Eilat. It also claimed that it was a part of a larger group called the Islamic Resistance in Bahrain and promised more attacks on Israel until the end of the war.
- The al Aqsa Martyrs' Brigades clashed with Israeli troops using IEDs in Jalzone, near Ramallah.
- Trinidad and Tobago officially recognized the State of Palestine.

=== 3 May ===
- The Gaza Health Ministry reported that at least 26 Palestinians were killed in Israeli attacks in the past 24 hours, bringing the Palestinian death toll to 34,622.
- Israeli forces recovered a body of a man under rubble of a house it demolished in Deir al-Ghusun, north of Tulkarm. The IDF blocked ambulances from reaching the person eight hours before.
- The UK imposed sanctions on four Israeli settlers and two settler groups for inciting and perpetrating violence against Palestinians in the West Bank.

=== 4 May ===
- The Gaza Health Ministry reported that at least 32 Palestinians were killed in Israeli attacks in the past 24 hours, bringing the Palestinian death toll to 34,654.
- Five Palestinians were killed by Israeli forces during an ongoing raid on a house in Deir al-Ghusun, near Tulkarm, bringing the total to six Palestinians killed since 3 May.
- A young Palestinian man was critically injured after Israeli forces shot him in the chest in Shuweika, near Tulkarm.
- Israeli forces shelled a mosque in Al-Fukhari, east of Khan Yunis.
- The Islamic Resistance in Iraq claimed to have used an "Arqab" cruise missile to conduct a long range missile attack targeting the Port of Haifa.

=== 5 May ===
- Hamas fired 10 rockets from Rafah onto Kerem Shalom, killing four Israeli soldiers of the Nahal Brigade and wounded ten others, raising the IDF death toll to 267. Israel closed the Kerem Shalom border crossing in response. Gaza health officials said that Israel's retaliation in Rafah killed at least 19 people, including the comannder of the PIJ in Rafah, who also invaded Israel and stormed the Sufa outpost in the October 7 Attacks.
- The Gaza Health Ministry reported that at least 29 Palestinians were killed in Israeli attacks in the past 24 hours, bringing the Palestinian death toll to 34,683.
- The Israeli cabinet voted to shut down Al-Jazeera's operations in Israel and the Occupied Territories. Police subsequently raided its offices.

=== 6 May ===
- The Gaza Health Ministry reported that at least 52 Palestinians were killed in Israeli attacks in the past 24 hours, bringing the Palestinian death toll to 34,735.
- Overnight Israeli bombardment killed 22 people in Rafah, including eight children.
- The Palestinian Mujahideen Brigades claimed that its fighters along with the Abu Ali Mustafa Brigades destroyed an IDF site in the Netzarim Corridor with a barrage of short-range rockets.
- The IAF dropped leaflets on the eastern parts of Rafah, telling the Palestinians sheltering in the Brazil Camp, al-Shabura and al-Zohour neighborhoods to flee to al-Mawasi, claiming that the displacements will be "temporary".
