= Technological and Logistics Directorate =

Directorate of the Israel Defense Forces

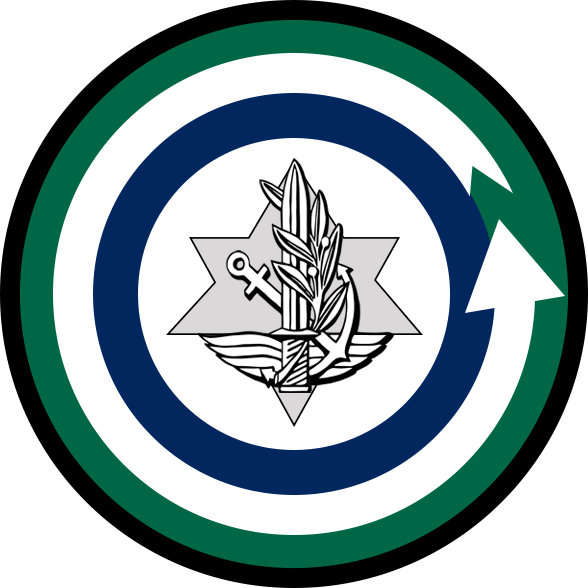
Logistics, Medical, and the Centers Directorate logo

The Israeli The Technological and Logistics Directorate (Hebrew: אט"ל, romanized: ATAL, abbreviation of אגף הטכנולוגיה והלוגיסטיקה, Agaf HaTeknologia VeHaLogistika, lit. 'Technological and Logistics Directorate') is a directorate in the General Staff of the Israel Defense Forces, responsible for its logistics responses and tasks, and in particular: the building and maintenance of military bases, maintaining a medical infrastructure during peacetime and times of war and emergencies, caring for the nutrition of soldiers, purchasing and distributing spare parts and equipment, storing and conveying weapons and ammunition, as well as for the fuel and maintenance of the managerial and military vehicle fleet of the IDF.

The Directorate is the third manifestation of the Technological and Logistics Directorate, overseeing the Logistics Corps, which saw many of its units and much of its authority transferred to the Ground Forces. During an emergency, the directorate is also responsible for the deployment of most non-combat reserve units. As of 2024, it is headed by Aluf Michel Yanko.

== History ==
The directorate was established in February 1948 under the name Quartermasters Directorate (Hebrew: אג"א, romanized: AGA, abbreviation of אגף אפסנאות, Agaf Afsa'na'ot, lit. 'Ordnance Directorate'). In the early period of the IDF, logistics and ordnance were highly centralized, with the General Staff maintaining almost complete control over the allocation of resources — including transport, fuel, construction materials, and food — to battalions and brigades under strict rationing. During the 1948 War of Independence, as combat formations organized and expanded, logistical systems developed within them to meet operational needs, with the General Staff-level ordnance system consolidating gradually thereafter.

In its early years, the Quartermasters Directorate drew heavily on the expertise of soldiers who were veterans of the British Army and the Jewish Brigade. The structure of the directorate, along with the broader logistics system, was modeled closely on the British Army, with forms and terminology likewise adopted from British military practice.

During the first decade of Israeli statehood, the directorate was organized into two departments: the Organization Department, responsible for setting standards, procurement plans, oversight, and procedures, including the training system; and the Maintenance Department, responsible for operating the logistics system through the Supply Corps — later renamed the Maintenance Corps and today known as the Logistics Corps — as well as the Ordnance and Equipment Corps and the Technicians Corps. In 1950, the Ordnance and Equipment Corps was dissolved; its equipment functions were transferred to the Supply Corps, while its ordnance functions passed to the Technicians Corps, which was renamed the Ordnance Corps in 1953. In 1951, the Supply and Transport Corps was split into separate Supply and Transport Corps; responsibility for transport was subsequently returned to the Supply Corps in 1953.

A special General Staff planning team established in late 1952, tasked with reviewing the IDF's force structure and formulating a new order of battle, debated the division of authority between AGA, its subordinate corps, and the Ministry of Defense. A proposal to centralize all procurement within the Ministry of Defense was ultimately rejected in favor of the principle, associated with Prime Minister David Ben-Gurion, that the IDF determines its own requirements and priorities, with the Ministry of Defense responsible for fulfilling them within budgetary constraints.

In 2016, the directorate was merged with the Ground Forces Command. The insignia used by the directorate until that year had been designed during a reorganization initiated by Chief of Staff Dan Halutz. It was the first directorate insignia in the IDF to have been designed by a serving soldier — Mital Zilberman, a graphic designer within the unit — rather than by an external contractor.

== Commanders ==
Name	Tenure
Yosef Avidar	July 1947 – July 1949
Monty Green	July 1949 – March 1950
Ephraim Ben-Artzi	March 1950 – March 1952
Zvi Ayalon	March 1952 – March 1954
Meir Ilan	March 1954 – March 1960
Moshe Goren	March 1960 – March 1964
Mattityahu Peled	March 1964 – March 1968
Amos Horev	March 1968 – March 1972
Nehemiah Cain	March 1972 – October 1974
Aryeh Levi	October 1974 – October 1978
Yohanan Gur	October 1978 – October 1983
Haim Erez	October 1983 – October 1986
Menahem Einan	October 1986 – January 1989
Ilan Biran	January 1989 – April 1992
Shalom Hagai	April 1992 – April 1995
Ami Sagis	April 1995 – April 1998
Aharon Ze'evi-Farkash	April 1998 – April 2001
Udi Adam	April 2001 – April 2005
Avi Mizrahi	April 2005 – December 2007
Dan Biton	December 2007 – March 2012
Kobi Barak	March 2012 – July 2016
Aharon Haliva	July 2016 – May 2018
Yitzhak Turgeman	May 2018 – November 2021
Michel Yanko	November 2021 – September 2025
Rami Abudraham	September 2025 –
