= Logistics Corps =

- חיל הלוגיסטיקה
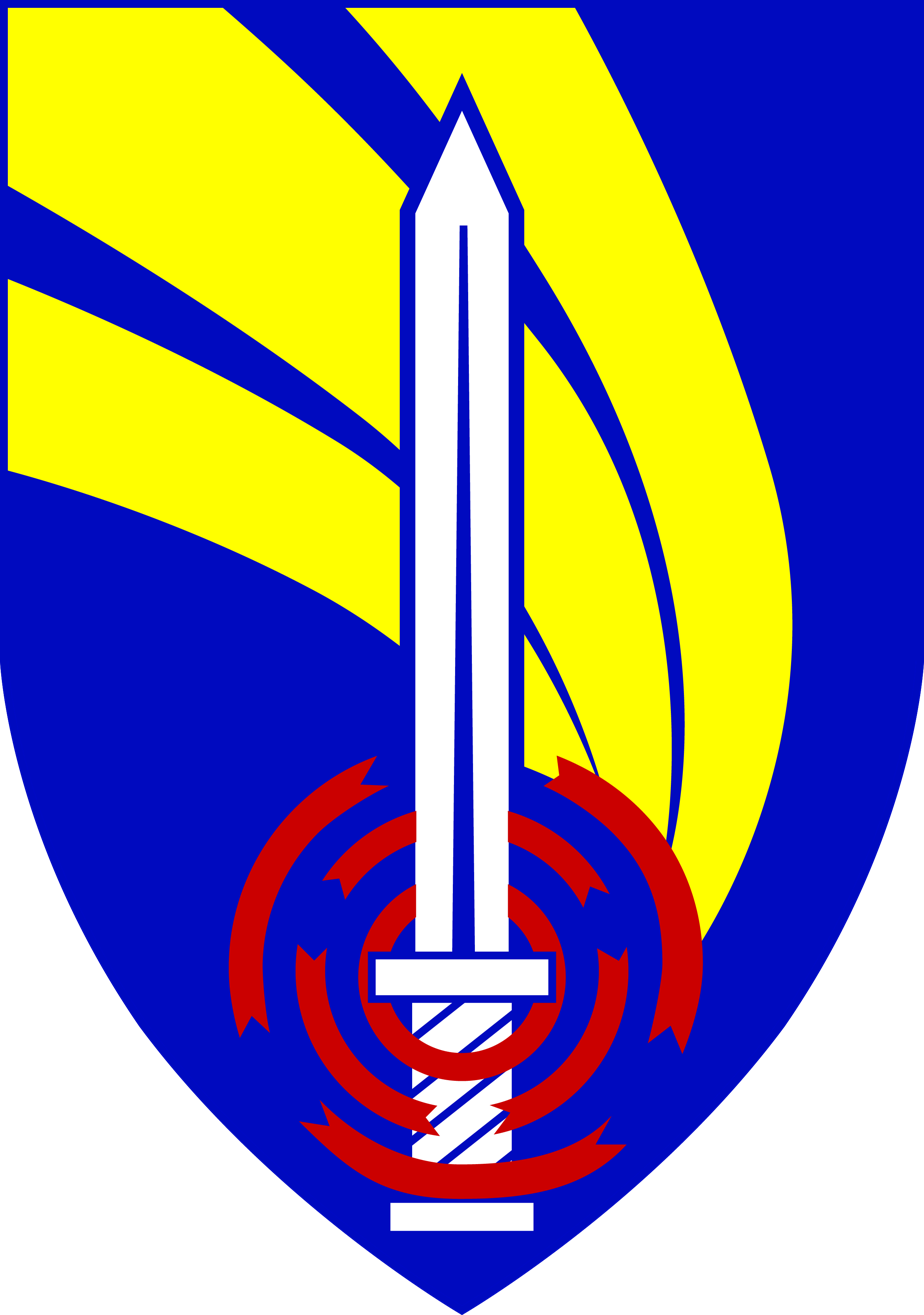
- Active: 1975–present
- Country: Israel
- Allegiance: Israel Defense Forces

Commanders
- Current commander: Tat Aluf Haim Malki

Insignia
- Flag

The Israeli Logistics Corps is a support corps in the IDF Technological and Logistics Directorate, which centralizes the logistical activity in the IDF, including the transporting of supplies, shipments of fuel, construction, and transport. Its training base, Bahad 6, is located in Tzrifin and is intended to be moved to the Training Base City in the Negev, whose construction is expected to be complete by 2009. As of July 2023, the Chief Logistics Officer is Brigadier-General Ronen Cohen.

== History ==
The first transport unit of the Yishuv was the British army's Zion Mule Corps, founded by Joseph Trumpeldor in 1915. During World War II, two transport units were created to assist the Ha'apala boats. During the 1948 Arab–Israeli War, the Quartermasters Directorate provided logistical services for the IDF, in a model based on a British design. In July 1948, their supply services took the main part in breaking through the Burma Road into sieged Jerusalem.

Toward the Suez War, the logistical corps undertook a massive purchase from France and recruited many civilian vehicles. In 1966, the IDF implemented reforms in its logistical branches, and nine professional centres were established to centralize the logistical activities, under the Quartermasters Directorate. The new logistical centres model proved effective during the Six-Day War. During the War of Attrition, the corps supplied troops situated on the Bar Lev Line, which suffered heavy fire. Supply stations were created in the Sinai and the responsibility for construction in the IDF was transferred to the Quartermasters Directorate.

During the Yom Kippur War, logistics troops were integrated with the fighting forces. Heavy vehicles were recruited to transfer forces between the battle arenas and a dispatch of the supply centre was established west of the Suez Canal. The Quartermasters Crops was created in July 1975, in the framework of the post-Yom Kippur War reorganization of the IDF. Its first commander was Brigadier-General Pinchas Lahav. The corps' training base (#6) was founded in Tzrifin in 1978.

During the 1982 Lebanon War, air supply saw extensive use due to the congested and few available roads in Southern Lebanon. Following the establishment of the Security Strip in Southern Lebanon, the Strip's posts were defended by the Building Centre and the Engineering Corps. A logistical centre that was created within the Strip employed Lebanese drivers that supplied the posts. In 1999, a complementary defensive posts operation was undertaken by a Lebanese contractor and supervised by the Building Centre. Some of the fortifications were destroyed during the evacuation of the Security Strip in May 2000. During Operation Defensive Shield of 2002, regional supply centres were established, detention centres were created for all the regional brigades, as well as a command detention centre.

During 2009 Batzap base was used to prepare for future tank manoeuvres. This base is near Tel Aviv.

== Clothing ==
The Israeli Forces sell items corresponding to the Logistic Corps on their website.
