= Ephraim Ben-Artzi =

Israeli general and businessman

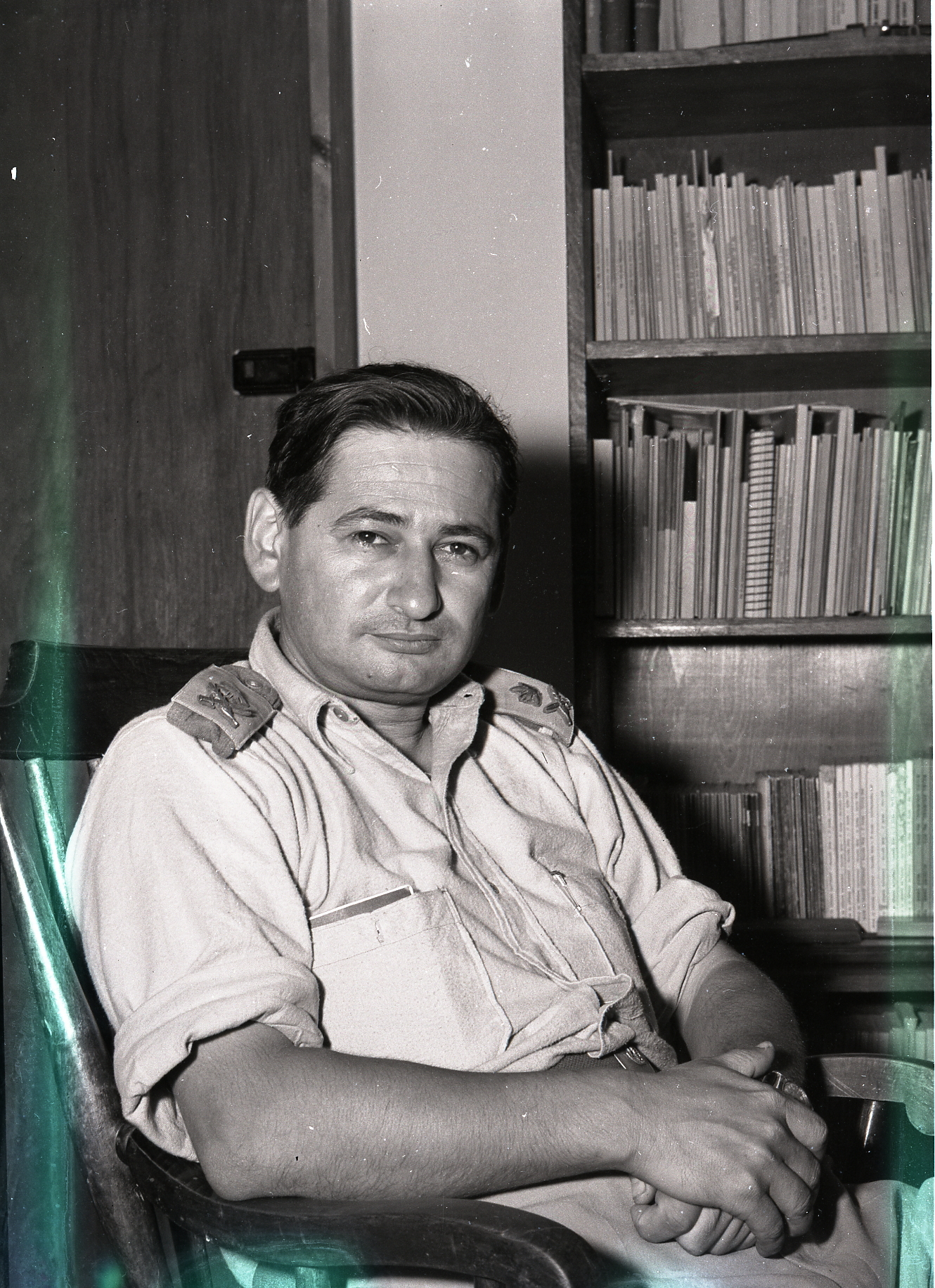
- Born: July 19, 1910; Slonim, Russian Empire
- Died: February 6, 2001 (aged 90); Caesarea, Israel
- Military career
- Allegiance: State of Israel
- Service years: 1948-1952
- Rank: Aluf
- Commands: Commander of the Quartermasters Directorate
- Conflicts: 1936–1939 Arab revolt in Palestine; World War II; 1947–1949 Palestine war

Ephraim Ben-Artzi (Hebrew: אפרים בן-ארצי) (1910-2001) was an Israeli general and businessman.

== Biography ==
Ephraim Kobrinsky (later Ben-Artzi) was born in Slonim, Poland, then in the Russian Empire (now in Belarus), one of four children born to Shamai and Rachel Kobrinsky. His father was a merchant who supplied clothing to the Imperial Russian Army. His family moved to Białystok in 1922. In 1924 his family immigrated to Mandatory Palestine. He studied at the Herzliya Hebrew Gymnasium.

Ben-Artzi married interior decorator Dora Gad in 1959. The couple had no children.

== Military career ==
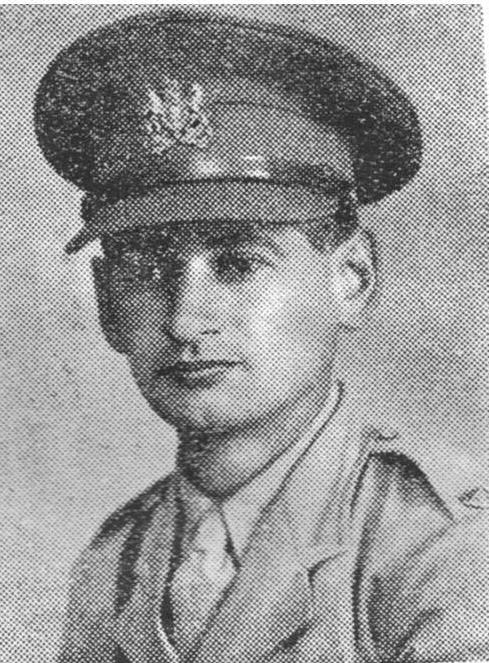
Ben-Artzi as a Lieutenant Colonel in the British Army, 1946

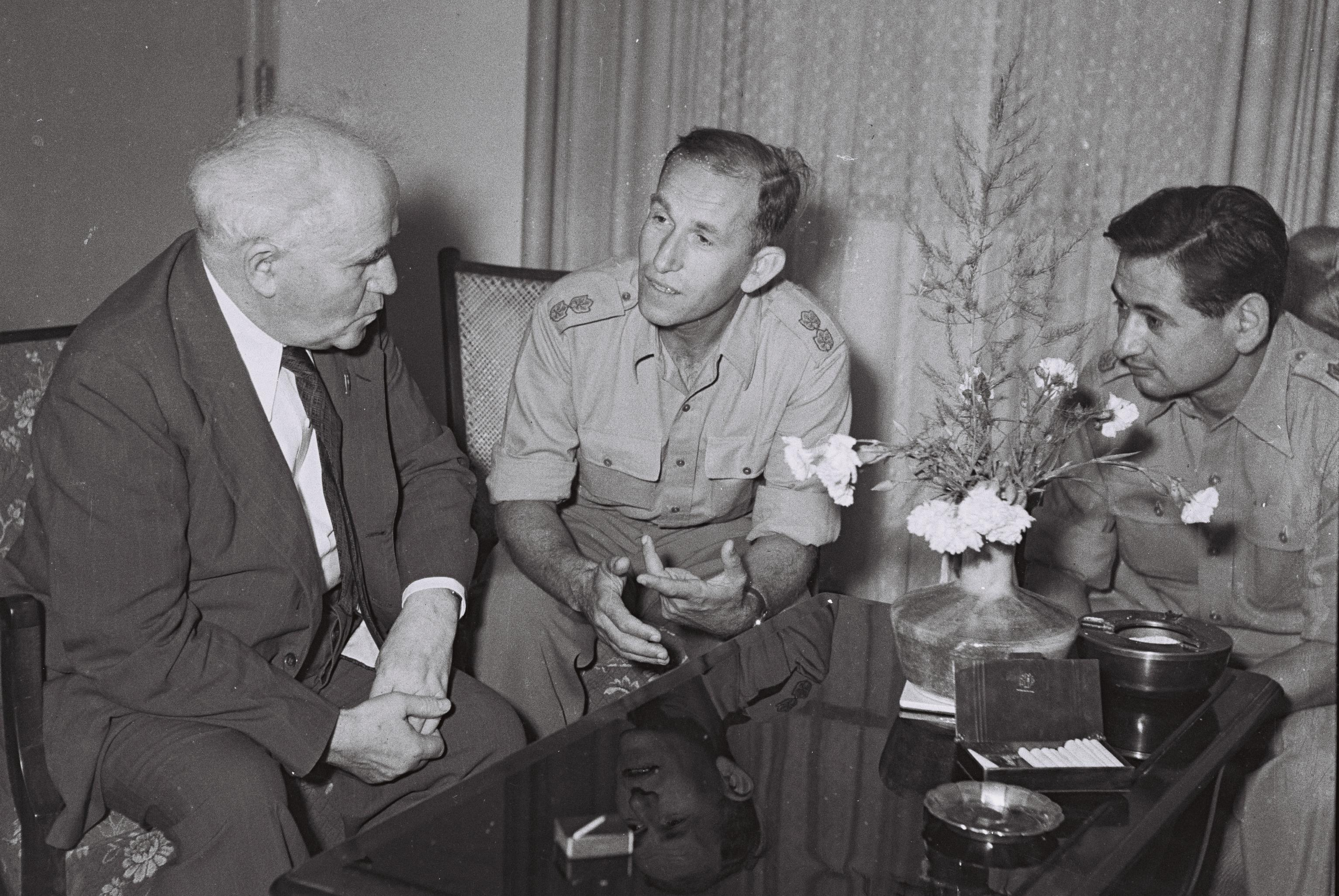
Ben-Artzi, right, with Chaim Sheba and David Ben-Gurion, October 1948

In 1935, Ben-Artzi joined the Haganah. During the 1936–1939 Arab revolt in Palestine, he served in a number of command positions. After World War II broke out he enlisted in the British Army and was among the first Jews from Palestine to become officers. He was initially a company commander with the rank of Major and later commanded the 3rd battalion of the Jewish Brigade. In January 1946, he was promoted to the rank of Lieutenant Colonel, the highest rank ever achieved by a service member from the Yishuv in the British Army. He participated in the London Victory Celebrations of 1946. Ben-Artzi was discharged from the British Army in 1947.

In 1948 he was appointed deputy head of the Quartermasters Directorate of the Israel Defense Forces during the Israeli War of Independence and subsequently served as an Israeli military attaché in the United States and Canada. In 1950, upon his return to Israel, he was promoted to the rank of Aluf and served until 1952 as head of the Quartermasters Directorate.

== Later career ==
Ben-Artzi was executive director of Mekorot from 1952 to 1955 and executive director of El Al from 1956 to 1967. He was also an advisor to Minister of Trade and Industry Pinchas Sapir in 1956. After leaving El Al, he became manager of the Arad industrial complex. In 1968, he was a representative of the Prime Minister's Office in negotiations with the United States for a loan to fund a desalination plant in Israel, which were ultimately unsuccessful. He was one of the founders of Yad Levi Eshkol.

In 1973, Ben-Artzi headed a committee that recommended the designs of IDF medals. In 1975, he became the managing director of Amidar. He served in this position until 1977. In 1980, he was appointed to the board of directors of a holding company.
