= Al-Brazil =

Neighborhood in Rafah, Palestine

Coordinates: 31°16′16.449″N 34°15′16.599″E

Al-Brazil is a neighborhood in the city of Rafah, in the Gaza Strip, one of the Palestinian territories. It lies in the South, by the border with Egypt. It was named after Brazil due to the presence of Brazilian soldiers in the United Nations Emergency Force which operated in Gaza in the 1950s-60s (the so-called Suez Battalion). There's another version of the origin of the name which sustains that it was only named Al-Brazil in the 1990s, when Brazil financed renovations there.

== History ==
The neighborhood was founded around an eponymous street, in a place that was known as "Campo Brasil" (Brazil Camp), and expanded for some blocks all the way to the border with Egypt, being home to refugees from conflicts with Israel.

Following the Six-Day War, Israeli forces tried to rename the place to Al Nahla ("honey bee" in Arabic) in honor of a Jewish man who died there and in whose pockets some well-preserved sweet dates were found weeks later. However, residents resisted the change; some even questioned the story's veracity. In 1970, when Israel built residential blocks for dislocated people, there was a second attempt to rename the place, this time to Dekel B, "dekel" being the Hebrew term for palm tree.

The conflicts between the two peoples made the neighborhood a constant target of Israeli bombings in at least three occasions: in the early 2000s, in 2014 and in 2024. In the first time, in the context of the Second Intifada, according to a report by the Human Rights Watch, Israel allegedly used bulldozers to bring down houses and open paths for its troops, avoiding possibly mined roads and giving its residents only a brief time to pick up their belongings, with some buildings being demolished while still occupied. According to The Guardian, 200 houses were demolished or bombed in Rafah, displacing 1,700 people, following an effort by the Israeli Army to uncover tunnels supposedly used to smuggle weapons from Egypt. In Al-Brazil specifically, a couple dozens houses were destroyed. Three tunnels and no weapons were found in the operation. Back then, the Israeli forces claimed only ten houses had been destroyed.

The most recent destruction took place as a consequence of the ongoing Gaza war. Over a year, Al-Brazil was one of the most targeted neighborhoods during Israeli bombings, since Israel claimed the place was harboring Hamas terrorists. Before these last attacks, Al-Brazil was a poor part of the city, full of low, poorly finished and overpopulated buildings. A representative of the UNRWA told BBC Brasil that efforts to rebuild the neighborhood, although accomplished in the past, are now uncertain due to the current level of destruction in the Gaza Strip, which he classified as "unprecedented".

== See also ==
- Brazil–Palestine relations
