= Michel Yanko =

Israeli army officer

- מישל ינקו
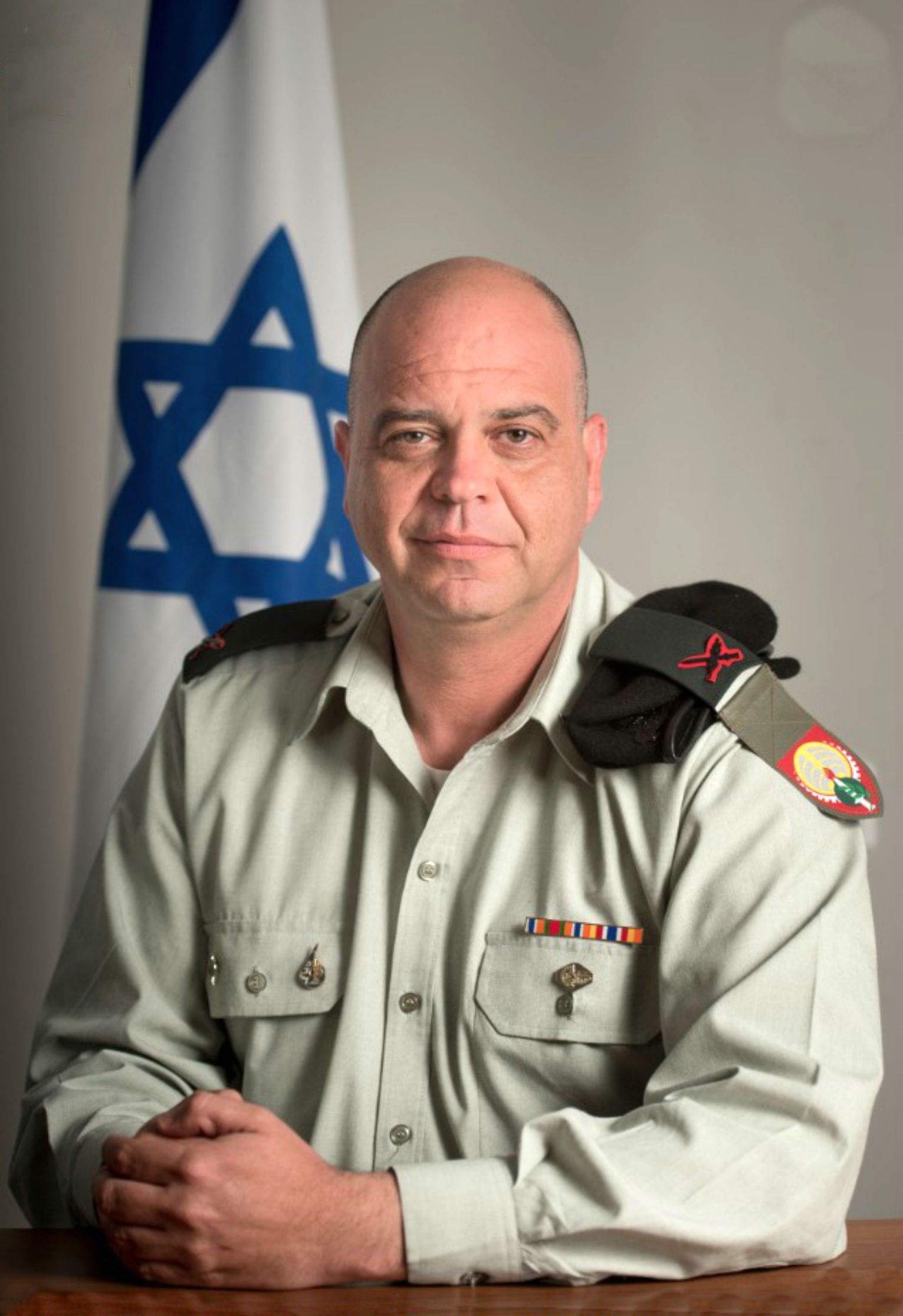
- Yanko in 2017
- Born: Israel
- Military career
- Allegiance: Israel
- Branch: Israel Defense Forces
- Service years: 1988–present
- Rank: Aluf (Major general)
- Conflicts: South Lebanon conflict (1985–2000); First Intifada; Second Intifada; 2006 Lebanon War; Operation Cast Lead; Operation Pillar of Defense; Operation Protective Edge; Gaza war

Michel Yanko (Hebrew: מישל ינקו; born September 1, 1970) is an IDF officer with the rank of Aluf, who served as head of the Technological and Logistics Directorate (ATAL).

In the past he served as head of Technology and Maintenance Corps, head of HR Planning, Organization and Human Resources, Command Maintenance Officer in the Central Command and Chief of Staff of the Manpower Directorate.

== Biography ==
Yanko grew up and was educated in Netanya, studied at ORT Yad Leibovitz high school in Netanya.

Yanko enlisted in the IDF and held a number of positions, starting as a tank electrician. In 1997-1998 he served as the maintenance and service officer of the Kiryati Brigade. In 2006 he was appointed Maintenance and Service Officer of the Ga'ash Formation, in 2008 he was appointed Head of the Commanders Training Branch at the Technological and Maintenance Corps Training School at the corps training base, in 2010 he was appointed Maintenance and Service Officer in the Central Command, and later was a student at the National Security College. In 2013 he was appointed Head of the Planning, Organization and Human Resources Department in the Chief Ordnance Officer's Headquarters.

On February 27, 2017 he was promoted to the rank of Brigadier General, and in March 2017 began serving as Commander of the IDF Technological and Maintenance Corps.

Since December 2017, the Chief Ordnance Officer (QATANA"R) is the commander of the IDF maintenance corps, and is responsible for providing full maintenance support in routine and emergency situations, in order to ensure the availability of weapons systems.

On March 28, 2019 he was appointed Chief of Staff of the IDF Technology and Logistics Directorate.

In November 2021 he was promoted to the rank of Major General and took office as head of the Technology and Logistics Directorate.

Yanko holds a bachelor's degree in economics and logistics from Bar-Ilan University and a master's degree in military and national security, as well as a second master's degree in social sciences.

He is married and father of three. His sister, Dalia Yanko, was appointed head of the Security-Social Department at the Ministry of Defense.
