= Brazil–Palestine relations =

- Brazil: Palestine

Brazil–Palestine relations are the current and historical bilateral relations between Brazil and Palestine. On 5 December 2010, Brazil officially recognized the State of Palestine including all of the West Bank and the Gaza Strip. In 2015, the Embassy of Palestine to Brazil was opened in Brasília, and the Brazilian government received an area in Ramallah for installing its diplomatic mission to Palestine.

== Palestinian statehood ==
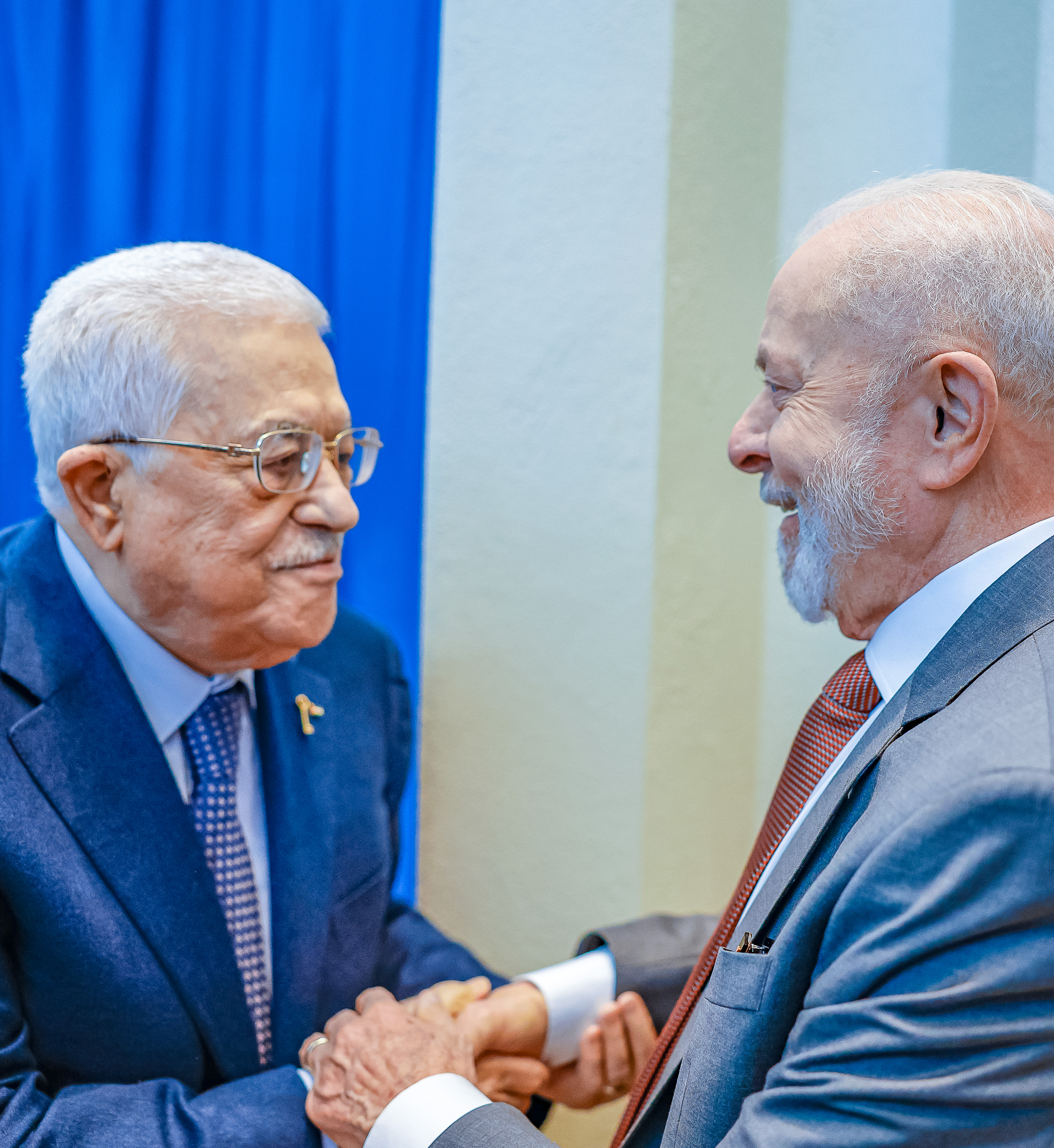
Palestinian President Mahmoud Abbas with Brazilian President Luiz Inácio Lula da Silva, 25 September 2024

In 2010, Brazil has firmly stressed its support for a Palestinian state within the 1967 borders, including West Bank and the Gaza Strip. The Brazilian Government has also advocated the end of the blockade of the Gaza Strip. On 5 December 2010, it formally recognized the State of Palestine in the 1967 borders, including all of the West Bank, Gaza Strip and East Jerusalem. The move initiated a chain reaction through the region. Given Brazil's economic prominence, its South American neighbors likely saw low political risks in following Brasília's lead. In her address to the General Assembly, President Dilma Rousseff reiterated Brazil's firm support: "We believe the time has come for us to have Palestine fully represented as a full member in this forum." Brazil voted in favor of Palestine's admission as a full member of UNESCO and has announced that it will support Palestine's full membership application when it comes to a vote at the Security Council.

In 2015, the Embassy of Palestine to Brazil was opened in Brasília, and the Brazilian government received an area in Ramallah for installing its diplomatic mission to Palestine.

Following the 2018 Brazilian presidential election, President-elect Jair Bolsonaro, a staunch pro-Israel conservative, threatened to close the Palestinian embassy, and stated that Palestine "is not a country."

In March 2019, Palestinian officials condemned Brazil's opening of commercial office in Jerusalem, as Palestinian officials consider Jerusalem as an integral part of the occupied Palestinian territories. Palestinians also condemned the visit of Brazilian President Jair Bolsonaro to Jerusalem's Western Wall accompanied by Israel's prime minister in 2019.

Under Bolsonaro, Brazil has voted against Palestine in multilateral forums, further leading to the deterioration of Brazil–Palestine relations. In February 2020, Brazil asked the International Criminal Court (ICC) to stop its investigation into Israel for war crimes committed against the Palestinian people. In November 2020, Brazil voted against the approval of a resolution at the World Health Organization (WHO) to guarantee access to healthcare services for the Palestinian population residing in the occupied territories.

In 2023, following his reelection, Brazilian President Luiz Inácio Lula da Silva condemned the ongoing violence in Gaza, called for a ceasefire in the Gaza war and accused Israel of committing genocide against Palestinians in the Gaza Strip. On February 17, 2024, Luiz Inácio Lula da Silva denounced the military operations of Israel while speaking to reporters at the African Union summit in Addis Ababa, comparing the events in Gaza to that of the Holocaust. The statement was highly contentious within Israel, receiving strongly-worded statements from public figures including Benjamin Netanyahu. Even though Brazilian political leaders criticized the statement, Lula recalled the Brazilian ambassador to Israel, and summoned the Israeli ambassador for a reprimand, while Israel deeming the president of Brazil a persona non grata. Since then, Lula maintained his position.

During his speech at the International Conference for the Peaceful Settlement of the Palestinian Question and the Implementation of the Two-State Solution at the United Nations General Assembly in 2025, Lula declared:

"The conflict between Israel and Palestine is the paramount symbol of the obstacles faced by multilateralism. [...] The tyranny of the veto sabotages the very reason for the UN's existence of avoiding atrocities like the ones that motivated its founding from happening again. A state is based on three pillars: territory, population and government, all of which have been systematically undermined in the Palestinian case. The terrorist acts committed by Hamas are unacceptable. Brazil was emphatic in condemning them. But the right to defence does not authorize the indiscriminate killing of civilians. Nothing justifies taking the lives or mutilating more than fifty thousand children. Nothing justifies destroying 90% of Palestinian homes. Nothing justifies using hunger as a weapon of war, nor targeting starving people seeking help. How can we talk about territory in the face of an illegal occupation that grows with each new settlement? How do you keep a population in the face of the ethnic cleansing we are witnessing in real time? There is no more appropriate word to describe what is happening in Gaza than 'genocide'. What is happening in Gaza is not only the extermination of the Palestinian people, but an attempt to annihilate their dream of a nation. Both Israel and Palestine have the right to exist".

In May 2026, Brazil joined eleven other nations in issuing a joint declaration condemning an Israeli military interception of the Global Sumud Flotilla, a nonviolent humanitarian initiative traveling through international waters near Crete toward the Gaza Strip. The statement, issued alongside Colombia, Spain, Turkey, and eight other countries, called for international accountability and the immediate release of all detained activists, including four members of the Brazilian delegation.

== See also ==
- Foreign relations of Brazil
- Foreign relations of Palestine
