= Aharon Haliva =

Israeli Major general (born 1967)

- אהרון חליוה
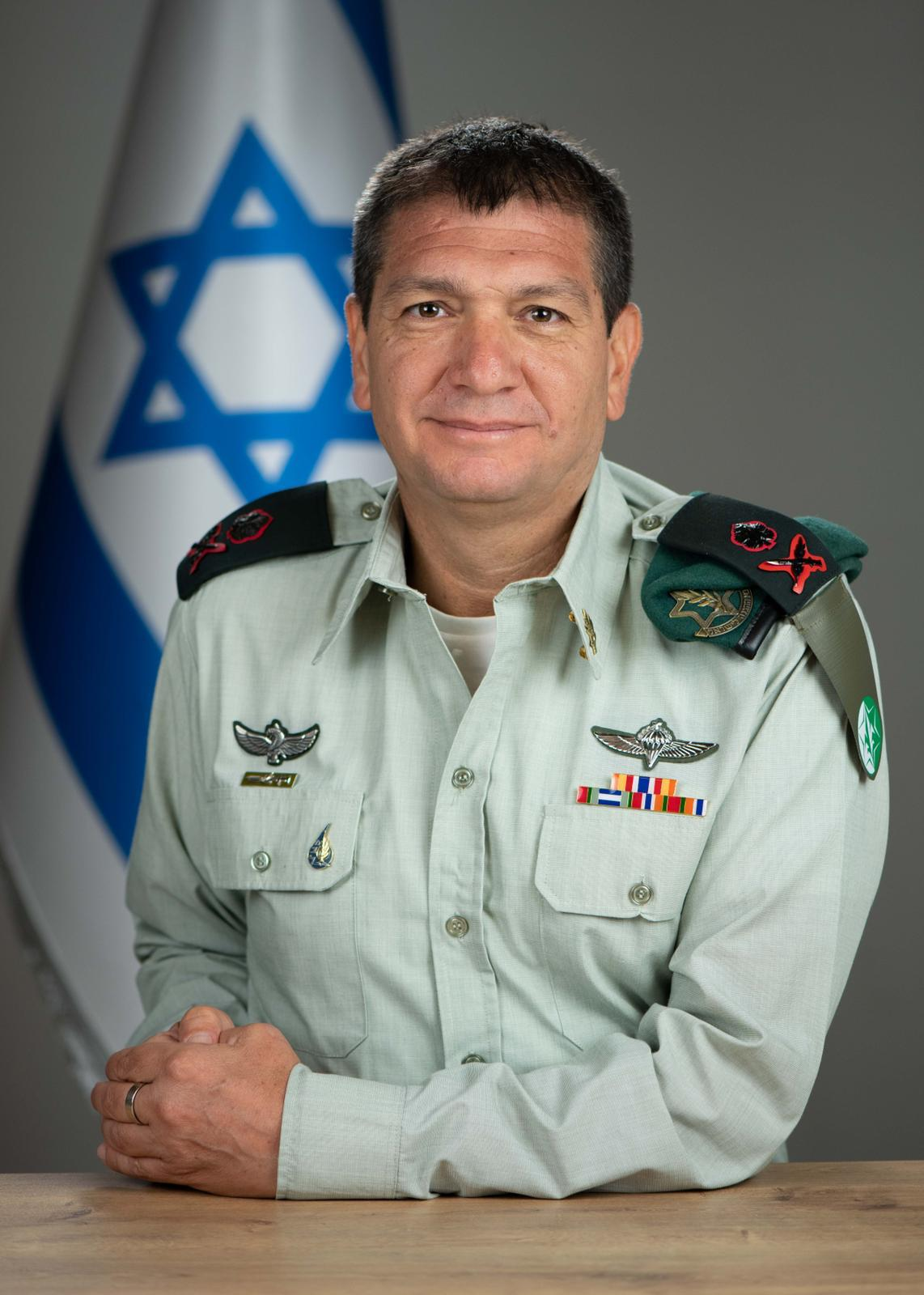
- Aharon Haliva, 2022.
- Born: October 12, 1967 (age 59); Haifa, Israel
- Military career
- Allegiance: Israel
- Branch: Israel Defense Forces
- Service years: 1985–2024
- Rank: Aluf (Major General)
- Commands: 202 "Tsefa" (Viper) paratroop battalion; 55th Paratroopers Brigade; Efraim Regional Brigade; IDF's Officer Candidate School (Bahad 1); Paratroopers Brigade; 98th Paratroopers Division; Operations Division of the Operations Directorate; Technological and Logistics Directorate; Operations Directorate; Military Intelligence Directorate
- Conflicts: South Lebanon conflict (1985–2000); First Intifada; Second Intifada; 2006 Lebanon War; Operation Cast Lead; Operation Pillar of Defense; Operation Protective Edge; 2021 Israel-Palestine Crisis; Gaza war

Aharon Haliva (Hebrew: אהרון חליוה; born October 12, 1967) is a former Israeli Major general (Aluf) who commanded the Israel Defense Forces' Military Intelligence Directorate. He previously served as the head of the Operations Directorate, the head of the Technological and Logistics Directorate, the head of the operations division in the operations directorate, the commander of the 98th Paratroopers Division, the commander of the paratroopers brigade, and the commander of The IDF Officers' School (Bahad 1). He resigned his position on April 22, 2024.

== Biography ==
Haliva, the son of Moroccan Jewish immigrants from Meknes, was born and raised in Haifa. Haliva was drafted into the Israel Defense Forces (IDF) in 1985. He volunteered as a paratrooper in the Paratroopers Brigade, and in 1985 became an infantry officer after completing Officer Candidate School. Haliva fought as a platoon leader at the 202 paratroop battalion in Operation Law and Order in Lebanon. Later on he led the 202nd Paratroopers Battalion in South Lebanon and during the Second Intifada. Afterwards he commanded the Paratroopers Brigade's training base and the 55th Paratroopers Brigade. Later on he led the Efraim Territorial Brigade in counter-terror operations and commanded the IDF's Officer Candidate School (Bahad 1). Then he was assigned as the commander of the Paratroopers Brigade. On the May 18, 2011 he was promoted to the rank of Brigadier General (Tat Aluf) and was appointed commander of the 98th Paratroopers Division. At the beginning of 2012 he told reserve officers in a closed conversation (referring to the 2011 Israeli social justice protests) "Because you demonstrated in Tel Aviv, the IDF has no money for missiles". In 2014, he was appointed head of the operations divisions in the Operations Directorate, and served in the position during, among other things, Operation Brother's Keeper and Operation Protective Edge. He finished his role in 2016.

=== Major general ===
On March 28, 2016, he was promoted to the rank of Major General (Aluf), and on July 13, he assumed his position as head of the Technological and Logistics Directorate. In November 2017, he forbade the holding of Torah lessons that took place outside Camp Ariel Sharon, a move that drew protest from hundreds of soldiers who turned to the Chief of Staff, Gadi Eisenkot. On May 2, 2018, he finished his post. On May 21, 2018, he was appointed head of the Operations Directorate. In January 2021, he appeared before the Foreign Affairs and Defense Committee for a discussion on the theft of weapons from the IDF, after many break-ins into IDF bases and thefts of weapons on a large scale. He served in the role during, among other things, in Operation Guardian of the Walls. He finished his position on June 9, 2021.

=== Head of the intelligence directorate ===
On October 5, 2021, he was appointed head of the Military Intelligence Directorate.

In his new position, he claimed that the Abraham Accords stem from the need of the population of the countries in the Middle East to improve their standard of living and deal with the climate crisis. Accordingly, he suggested that Israel focus on raising the standard of living of populations in neighboring countries such as Lebanon in order to bring stability to the region and claimed that a Lebanese gas rig is in Israel's interest. Haliva also estimated that Israel has a security interest in stabilizing the Palestinian Authority in order to reduce terrorism and estimated that Operation Guardian of the walls would bring long-term peace in light of the economic stabilization processes he identified in the Gaza Strip. Along with raising the standard of living of Israel's neighbors, he suggested focusing on precise, surgical damage to the enemies that need to be damaged, while avoiding damage to those not involved.

The night before the surprise attack on Israel by Hamas, which began on the morning of October 7, 2023, Haliva was updated with information about unusual activity by Hamas, but he estimated that it was an exercise and recommended waiting for the morning before taking action. About 1,400 Israeli soldiers and civilians were killed in the attack.

On October 17, 2023, he issued a letter to his soldiers in which he wrote about the failure to warn of the October 7 attack on Israel: "We failed in our most important mission, and as head of the IDF Intelligence Directorate I bear full responsibility for the failure." He has referred to the October 7 attack as a "Black Day".

On April 22, 2024, he resigned as head of the IDF Intelligence Directorate. Yair Lapid praised Haliva's decision to resign.

In recordings leaked in August 2025, Haliva can be heard saying "For everything that happened on October 7, for every person who was killed on October 7, 50 Palestinians must die" and "it does not matter now if they are children". "They need a Nakba every now and then to feel the price. There’s no choice, in this disturbed neighborhood." He went on to say that the prime minister (Netanyahu) "decided to strengthen Hamas for his own reasons."

On November 23, 2025, IDF chief of staff Eyal Zamir dismissed Haliva from reservist duty due to his role in Israel's failures on October 7.

== Personal life ==
Haliva lives in North Tel Aviv, is married a second time and has five children, including two from his previous marriage. He has a bachelor's degree in social sciences from Bar-Ilan University, and a master's degree in social sciences from Haifa University.
