= Omer Dagan =

Israeli military personnel

- עומר דגן
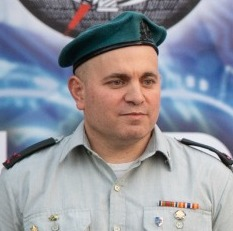
- Born: July 9, 1976 (age 49); Kibbutz Gat, Israel
- Education: Bar-Ilan University; Tel Aviv University
- Occupation: Military
- Employer: Israeli Defense Force (IDF)

Omer Dagan (Hebrew: עומר דגן; born July 9, 1976) is an Israel Defense Force reserve officer with the rank of Brigadier General, who served as commander of the Lotem unit from November 2019 to May 2023.

== Early life ==
Dagan was born in Kibbutz Gat. In 1994, he enlisted in the IDF for a programming course at Mamram and served as a programmer.

== Education ==
Dagan holds a BA in computer science and mathematics from Bar-Ilan University and an MA in political science with a specialization in National Security and Diplomacy from Tel Aviv University.

== Career ==
In 1997, he completed an officers' course and was appointed commander of a programming course at the Basmach (בסמ"ח) (IDF School of Computer Science), a position he held until 1999.

From 2006 to 2009 he served as the bureau chief of Ami Shafran, head of the Computer Service Directorate.

From 2009 to 2015, he served in three branch head positions, with the rank of lieutenant colonel. In 2015, he was appointed commander of the Matzpen (מצפ"ן) (Military Systems for Command and Control) unit under Lotem and served in this position until 2017. Subsequently, he served as a chief of staff in the Cyber Defense Division of the Computer Service Directorate, of which Dagan was one of its founders.

In 2018, he was appointed as the first Director of the Digital Transformation Directorate in the Computer Service Directorate.

In June 2019, he was promoted to Brigadier-General of Lotem and in November 2019, he was appointed commander of Lotem. In May 2023, he was succeeded by Brigadier-General Yael Grossman.
