= Israel Defense Forces insignia =

Uniforms and insignia of the Israel Defense Forces

This page details the uniforms and insignia of the Israel Defense Forces, excluding rank insignia. For ranks, see Israel Defense Forces ranks and insignia.

== Uniforms ==
IDF uniform colors

The Israel Defense Forces has several types of uniforms:

- Service dress (Madei Aleph) - "Class A" uniform; everyday wear, worn by enlisted soldiers.
- Field dress (Madei Bet) - "Class B" uniform; worn into combat, training, work on base.
- Career service dress / Ceremonial dress (Madei Keva) - "Class A" uniform; worn by non-commissioned officers, by commissioned officers from the rank seren (Captain) and above or by other ranks during special events/ceremonies.
- Dress uniform (Madei Srad) and Mess dress (Madei Gala) - Worn only during very important ceremonies and abroad by high-ranking officers. There are several dress uniforms depending on the season and the branch. Dress uniforms follow the American model and Mess Dress uniforms follow the British and Commonwealth pattern.

The service uniform for all ground forces personnel is olive green, navy and air force uniforms are beige. The uniforms consist of a shirt, combat trousers, beret neatly placed under epaulet), belt and boots. Additionally a bomber jacket and sometimes a sweater are issued to optionally be worn during cold weather. Sailors are additionally issued all-white dress uniform for ceremonies. Field dress consist of olive green fatigues, the same uniform is used for winter and summer, and heavy winter gear is issued as needed. Women's dress parallels the men's but a woman may choose to substitute a skirt for the trousers, or sandals for boots. NCOs and Officers with the rank of Captain or above wear different dress uniforms depending on the branch. Ground forces wear light teal shirts and dark green pants, in the Air Force light blue shirts and navy blue pants, and in the Navy white shirts and navy blue pants. Depending on position Officers with the rank of Captain and above may additionally substitute their boots for oxford dress shoes.

Some corps or units have small variations in their uniforms - for instance, military policemen wear a white belt and white police hat. Similarly, while most IDF soldiers are issued black leather boots, some units issue reddish-brown leather boots for historical reasons- The Paratroopers, Nahal and Kfir brigades, as well as the Border Protection Infantry and some SF units (Sayeret Matkal, Oketz, Duvdevan, Maglan, Lotar (Counter-Terror School)). Additionally, certain special operations units are issued canvas hiking boots for wear during missions.

== Berets ==
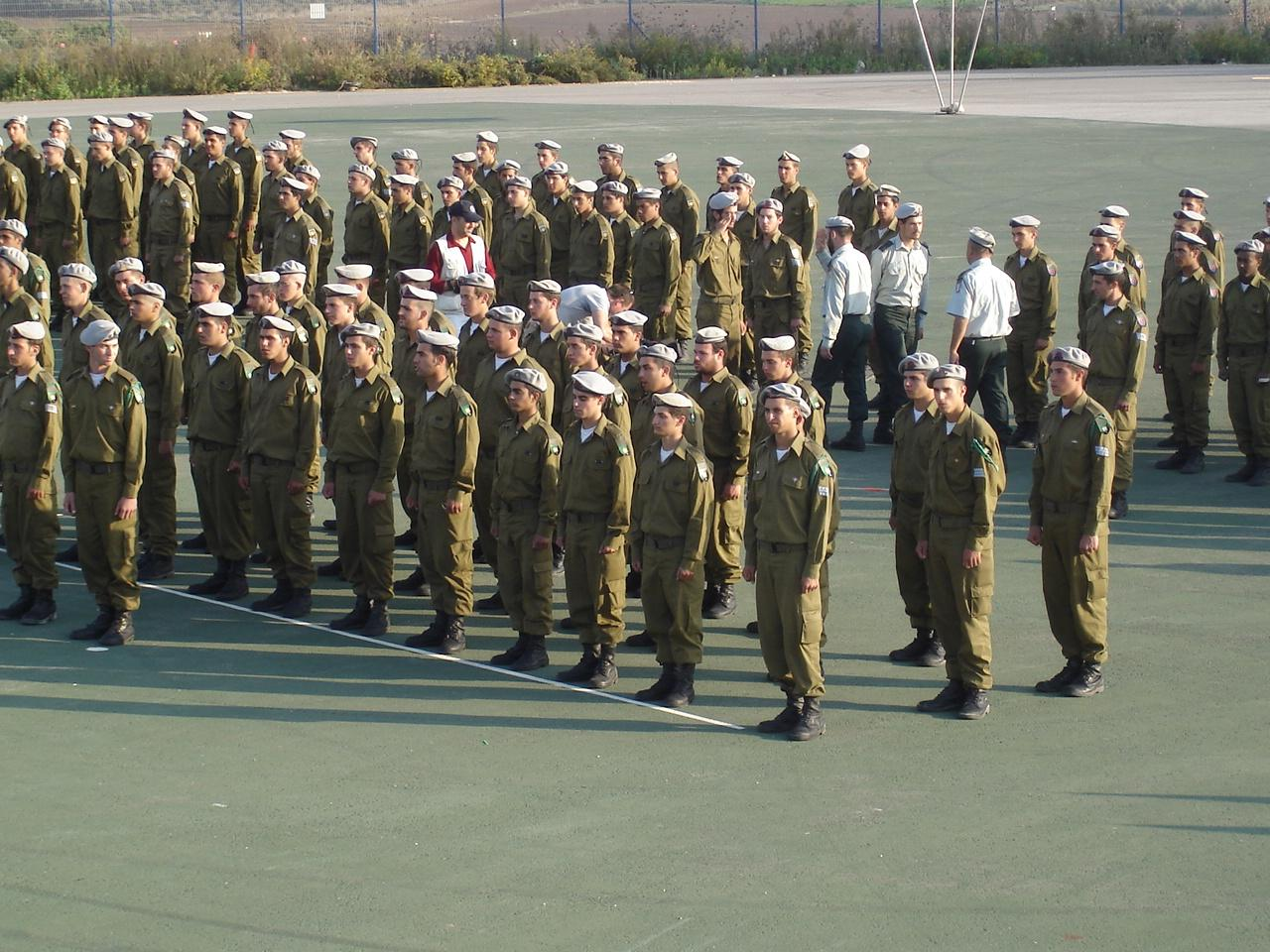
Soldiers of the Combat Engineering Corps being awarded with Grey berets

Each corps in the Israel Defense Forces has a beret of a different color and/or a different beret pin worn by its soldiers, independent of rank and position. Israel Defense Forces soldiers wear berets on their heads only on formal occasions, such as ceremonies and roll calls. The beret is placed beneath the left shoulder strap while wearing the service uniform (alef), but not while wearing the combat/work (bet) uniform in the field. On base it is left to the unit's discretion whether to wear berets or field hats. Air force and navy officers, military orchestra soldiers and military police law enforcement soldiers wear combination caps. Formerly, male soldiers of all ranks wore combination caps, while female soldiers wore the garrison cap. In the 1950s, the beret was adopted as the default headgear for the service uniform. The color of the air force beret was blue-gray; armored corps, artillery, and special operations personnel wore a black beret. Paratroopers, following the pattern of the British Army, wore maroon, all other infantry wore olive drab. Combat engineers wore a gray beret. For all other army personnel, except combat units, the beret for men was green and for women, black. Women in the navy wore a black beret with gold insignia while men wore the traditional white sailor cap like that of the US Navy.

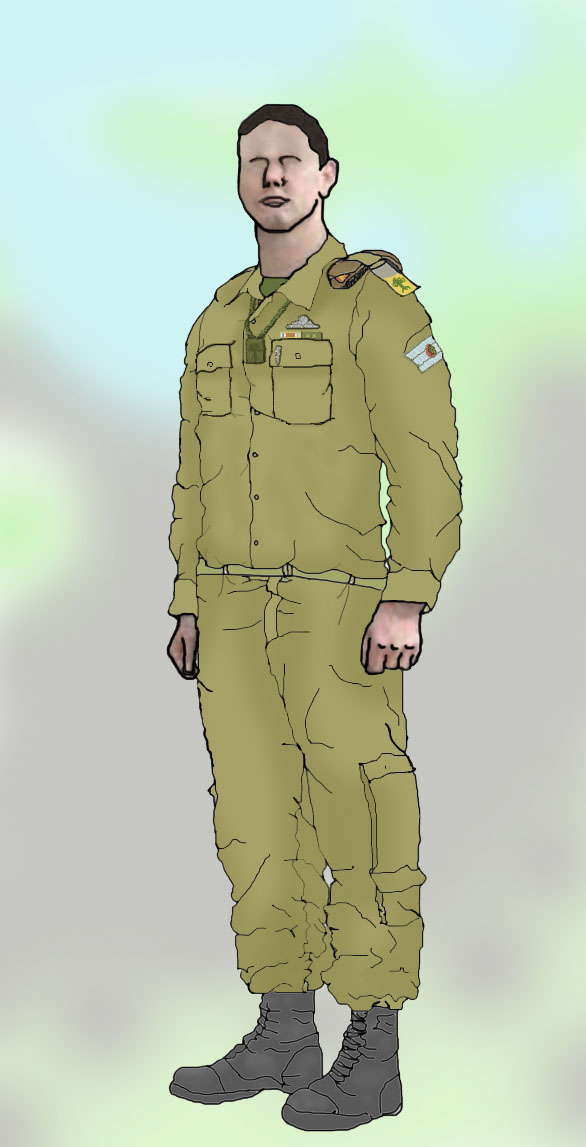
IDF Sergeant First Class, Medic, from the Golani Brigade, in service dress, with the 2006 Lebanon war ribbon & Regional Command-tier citation)

Corps	Color
Air Force
Air Force	
Infantry Corps
Golani Brigade	
Paratroopers Brigade and SF units	
Nahal Brigade	
Givati Brigade	
Kfir Brigade	
Armor Corps
Armor Corps	
Artillery Corps
Artillery Corps	
Combat Intelligence Corps
Combat Intelligence Corps	
Engineering Corps
Engineering Corps	
Intelligence
Directorate of Military Intelligence	
C4I Corps
C4I Corps	
Military Police
Military Police	
Border Police
Border Police	
Home Front
Home Front Command	
General
General Corps	
Navy
Sea Corps	

=== Beret pins ===
All berets in the Israel Defense Forces, other than general corps berets (when worn by recruits), have pins attached to their front, which represent the symbol of the corps. While soldiers may wear the beret of another corps due to serving at that corps' base, they will always wear the pin of their native corps. Each pin consists of the corps symbol as well as a certain ornament which also contains the name of the corps. Soldiers serving a term in military prison must wear a blank beret with no pins attached.

Corps	Pin symbol
The Chief of Staff Rosh HaMate HaKlali (Ramatkal)	Israel Defense Forces Emblem
General Staff HaMate HaKlali	Israel Defense Forces Emblem
Home Front Command Pikud HaOref (Heil HaOref)	Sword wrapped by an olive branch with a large triangle in the background
Military Rabbinate HaRabanut HaTzva'it	Figure of the Ten Commandments with a sword in the foreground
Military Advocate General HaPraklitut HaTzva'it	Scales and a sword
Air Force Heil HaAvir	Sword, olive branch, Star of David and wings (eagle wings, found at Bet-Shean excavations).
Infantry Corps Heil HaRaglim	Sword wrapped by an olive branch
Armor Corps Heil HaShiryon	Tank with olive branches
Artillery Corps Heil HaTothanim	Cannon/artillery piece
Combat Engineering Corps Heil HaHandasa HaKravit	Sword and castle surrounded by blast's halo
Field Intelligence Corps Heil Ha'Isuf Ha'Kravi	Sword and binoculars wrapped by an olive branch
Ordnance Corps Heil HaHimush	Sword, torch and a cog
Medical Corps Heil HaRefu'a	Snake around Rod of Asclepius, with Star of David on Bowl of Hygieia
Intelligence Corps Heil HaModi'in	Fleur-de-lis with half a star.
C4I Corps Heil HaTikshuv	Sword with wings and a pair of lightning bolts
Education and Youth Corps Heil HaHinukh VeHaNo'ar	Star of David, book and bow and arrow
Adjutant Corps Heil HaShalishut	Sword wrapped by an olive branch, a book, and a disk
Logistics Corps Heil HaLogistika	Sword, olive branch and a steering wheel
Military Police Heil HaMishtara HaTzva'it	Shield and flame
General Corps HaHayil HaKlali	Two crossed swords and a fig leaf
Israeli Navy Heil HaYam	Sword wrapped by an olive branch, anchor and seaweed
Israel Defense Forces Orchestra Tizmoret Tzahal	Harp of David placed between two trumpets amalgamated with olive branches.
Border Police Mishmar HaGvul (Magav)	Israel Police Star of David
Command Military School Cadets Pnimia Zvait Le Pikud	Sword wrapped by an olive branch on open book
Israel Air Force Technological College Cadets Michlala technologit shel Heil HaAvir	Propeller on open book, gearwheel and wings
Naval Officers School of Acre Cadets Beit haSefer leKzinei Yam Akko	Anchor and seaweed

== Shoulder tags ==
Typically, each IDF unit (yehida) has its own shoulder tag (tagei katef). Shoulder tags consist of a long section and a tip, which can be one of four shapes: a circle (commands, directorates and air force units except anti-aircraft), a rectangle (Golani Brigade), a diamond, or a shield-like shape (most common). Shoulder tags are only worn on dress uniforms, on the left shoulder attached to the shoulder strap.

Some of the IDF shoulder tags:

=== Infantry Brigades ===
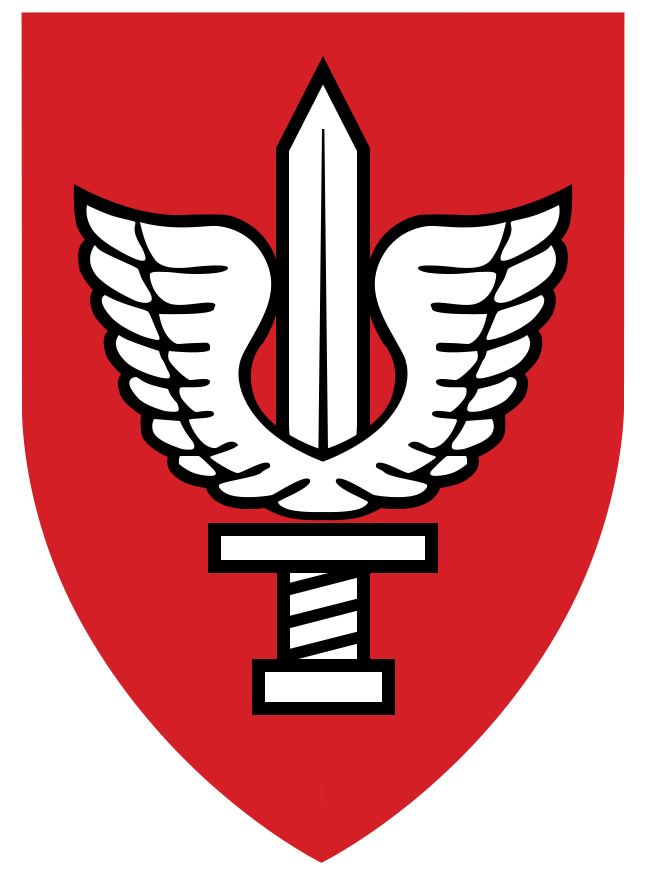

By order: Golani, Kfir, Tzanchanim, Nahal, Givati

== Insignia ==
Aiguillettes, Srochim in Hebrew are worn on the left shoulder* of the uniform to indicate a soldier's specific role a unit:

- Black/ Green: Commanders in the Section/ Squad Commanders’ Course
- Black/ Yellow: Instructor in Chemical Warfare
- Black: Commanders in the Officer Courses/ Advance Courses
- Blue/ Red: Military Police
- Burgundy/ Pink – Instructional Development Team, Multimedia Producer, Educational software programmer .
- Blue/ White: Chief Sergeant of a Base
- Brown: Behavioral Sciences Analyst
- Cerulean/ Orange: Search and Rescue
- Dark Blue: Navy Instructors
- Gold: Discipline Attaché
- Green: Section/ Squad Commander
- White/ Green: Military Intelligence Commander
- Grey: Education Attaché
- Claret: Multimedia Producer or Officer in an Educational Course
- Purple: Service Rights Attaché
- Red: IDF Orchestra (*Right Shoulder), Navy Instructor (Left Shoulder)
- White: Security Guards
- Yellow/ White: Field Intelligence Personnel

== Bibliography ==
- Furlan, M. (1986). Israel Defense Forces Insignia. Canada: Militaria House. p. 68. ISBN 978-0929757124.
- Katz, Sam; Ronald Volstad (1988). Israeli Elite Units since 1948. United Kingdom: Osprey Publishing. pp. 64. ISBN 978-0-85045-837-4.
- Katz, Sam; Ronald Volstad (1986). Israeli Elite Units since 1973. United Kingdom: Osprey Publishing. p. 64. ISBN 978-0-85045-687-5.
- Fridman, A. (2010). Jewish Cap Badges: British/Palestine and Israel Defense Forces. p. 60.
- Lubman, Roman; Shapiro Guy (2011). Israeli Defense Forces and Law Enforcement Hat Badges Catalog. p. 92.
