= Yael Grossman =

Israeli Defense force

- יעל גרוסמן
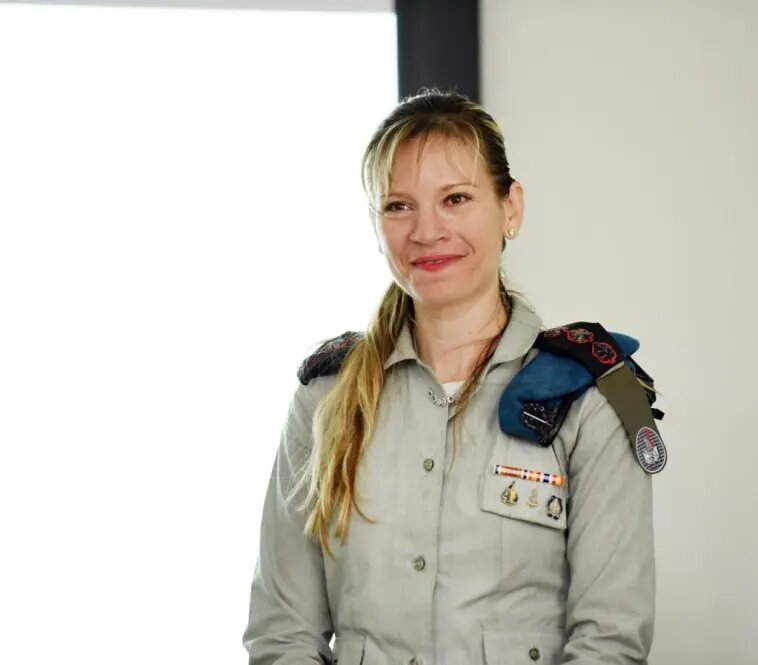
- Grossman in 2018
- Citizenship: Israeli
- Education: Tel Aviv University Ben-Gurion University of the Negev University of Haifa
- Occupation: Military
- Employer: Israeli Defense Force (IDF)

Yael Grossman (Hebrew: יעל גרוסמן) is the commander and Brigadier General of the Israeli Defense Force's (IDF) technology and intelligence unit Lotem.

== Education ==
Grossman enlisted in the IDF academic reserves program Atuda, where she studied for a BA in electrical engineering at Tel Aviv University. She holds an MBA with honors from Ben-Gurion University on the Negev. From 2016 to 2017, she studied at the National Security College, and received an MA in national security from the University of Haifa.

== Career ==
From 2003 to 2005, she served as Head of the single-band and Ground-to-Air Division of the Lotem Projects Department. From 2005 to 2007, she served as Head of the Long-Term Communications Division of the Lotem Systems and Projects Department. From 2007 to 2009, she headed the Satellite Systems Division of the Weapons Department of the Computer Service Directorate. From 2009 to 2011, she was the head of the office of Major General Ami Shafran, the head of the Computer Service Directorate.

From 2011 to 2016, she was Head of the Lotem Branch and the Computer Service Directorate and Cyber Defense Division.

She was appointed Head of the Future Department in the Computer Service Directorate and Cyber Defense Division with the rank of Colonel, and in June 2020, was appointed Mamram Commander. In July 2022, she was appointed to serve in Lotem Headquarters in the Computer Service Directorate and Cyber Defense Division.

In May 2023 she became the commander of Lotem with the rank of Brigadier General.

Grossman was one of the leaders of "She Shark" - the IDF's Program for Excellence for Women's Technological Leadership, and led the CyberGirlz community- a conference of Unit 8200 and the Computer Service Directorate to encourage young women to learn about technological tracks and roles in the IDF.
