= Daniel Bren =

Israeli businessman

- דניאל ברן
- Citizenship: Israel
- Occupation: Military Personnel

Daniel "Danny" Bren (Hebrew: דניאל ברן) is an Israeli businessman and retired Brigadier General of the Israeli Defense Forces, where he served as commander of the Lotem unit in the Computer Service Directorate.

== Military career ==
Bren began his military service in Unit 8200 in the IDF. He served in command positions in various technology units of the Computer Service Directorate. In 2010, he was appointed commander of the Ma'of (מעו"ף), the “systems and projects” department of the Lotem unit. He founded the Cyber Defense department in the Computer Service Directorate. In March 2013, he was appointed the commander of the Lotem unit.

In November 2015, he was appointed head of the intensification brigade, a new division established in the Computer Service Directorate. He worked closely with the National Cyber Bureau and helped defend the military's computer networks. He served in that position until June 2016.

In December 2016, he received the Chief of Staff Award for military writing for his article “This is How We've Always Done It” - personal insights from the processes of change and adaptation, published in the Hebrew journal "Between the Poles" at The Dado Center for Interdisciplinary Military Studies.

== Business career ==
In 2017, Bren, together with three other partners, founded OTORIO, an information security company that provides cyber protection services for critical infrastructures. He is CEO of OTORIO.

Bren has an Electrical Engineering B.Sc. EE from Tel Aviv University and an Electrical Engineering M.Sc. EE from Technion.
