= Ayala Hakim =

Israeli general and businesswomen

- אילה חכים
- Born: August 19, 1960 (age 66)
- Education: Bar-Ilan University (B.S., M.S.)
- Occupations: Businesswoman, former military officer
- Known for: Executive of the technology division of Mizrahi-Tefahot Bank, former Brigadier-general in the IDF
- Awards: Lidwig Mitvah Award for Outstanding Information Systems Managers (2013)

Ayala Hakim (Hebrew: אילה חכים; born August 19, 1960) is an Israeli businesswoman and former military general. She is the Head of Information Technology and Chief Executive Officer of the Technology division at Bank Mizrahi-Tefahot. Prior to that, she served in the IDF in various computer-related roles, and completed her service as the commander of the Lotem Unit with the rank of brigadier general.

== Education ==
She has a B.S. in Economics and Political Science and an M.S. in Business Management from Bar-Ilan University.

Hakim is married and has a daughter.

== Early life and career ==
Hakim grew up in Tel Aviv. In 1979 she enlisted in the IDF and served as a programmer in Mamram.

In 1999 she was transferred to the Israeli Intelligence Corps and in 2002 she became head of the computing unit of the Military Intelligence Directorate.

In 2005 she became deputy commander of Lotem Unit (Unit for Telecommunications and Information Technology) of the IDF Computer Service Directorate. In 2006 she became the 14th commander of Mamram (2006-2010).

In 2010 she was promoted to the rank of Colonel-general and appointed head of Lotem (2010-2013). She was the third woman to be promoted to this rank and the first woman in the IDF computer services.

In 2013 she was presented with the Lidwig Mitvah Award for Outstanding Information Systems Managers. That year, she retired from the IDF.

After leaving the IDF, she joined Bank Mizrahi-Tefahot as director of the information technology division.

On September 30, 2020 Bank Misrahi-Tefahot appointed her to the Board of Directors of the Union Bank of Israel after the acquisition of the Union Bank by Bank Mizrahi-Tefahot.
