= Shoham (name) =

Shoham (Hebrew: שוהם, lit. 'Onyx') is a Hebrew surname and given name.

Notable people with the name include:

== Given name ==
- Shoham Smith, Israeli writer

== Surname ==
- Amichai Shoham, Israeli footballer
- Liad Shoham, Israeli writer and lawyer
- Moshe Shoham, judge on the Supreme Court of Israel
- Noam Shoham
- Ofir Shoham
- Shlomo Giora Shoham
- Shlomo Shoham
- Uri Shoham
- Yoav Shoham, computer scientist and a professor emeritus at Stanford University

== See also ==
- Shoham (town in Israel)
- Killing of Yehuda Shoham
