= Kikoin =

Kikoin (feminine: Kikoina) is a Russian Jewish family name. Its transliteration into French is Kikoïne. Some, including Konstantin Berkovich, son of Abram Kikoin, suggest that the surname originated from the name of an obscure biblical plant kikayon. Konstantin claims that according to his genealogical research the surname ascends to a Gomel rabbi, who decided to change his mundane surname Schmidt. Notable people with the surname include:

- Abram Kikoin (1914–1999), Lithuanian Jewish and Soviet physicist
- Elsa Kikoïne (born 1977), French actress
- Gérard Kikoïne (born 1946), French film director and producer
- Isaak Kikoin (1908–1984), Lithuanian Jewish and Soviet physicist
- Jakob Kikoïne, birth name of Jacques Yankel (1920–2020), French painter, sculptor, and lithographer
- Michel Kikoine (1892–1968), Lithuanian-Jewish French painter
- Gina Kikoine, also credited as Gina X, German singer and lyricist, the namesake of Gina X Performance

== See also ==
- Mordechai Kikayon
