= Mordechai Kikayon =

Israeli computer scientist

Mordehai Kikayon
- מרדכי קיקיון
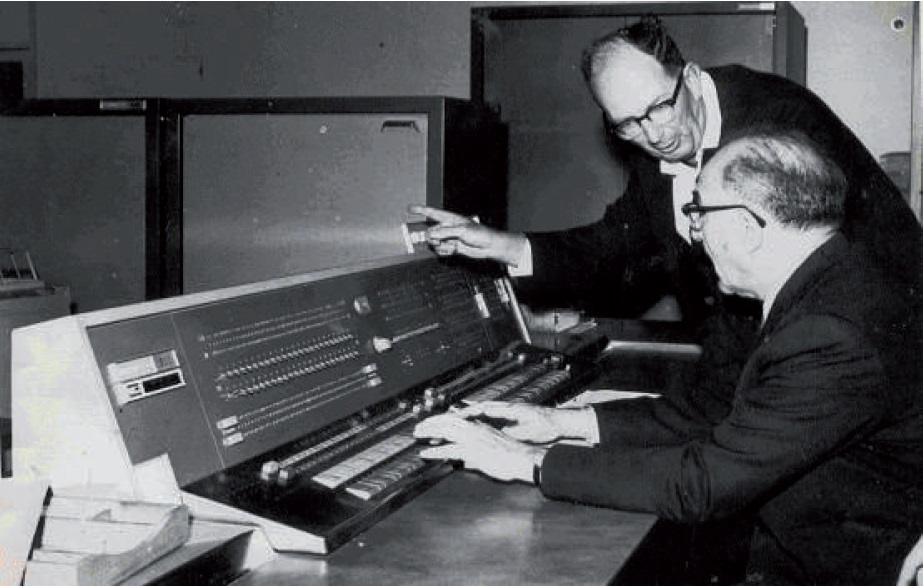
- Kikayon demonstrating Philco computer to Levi Eshkol, 1964
- Born: 1915; Russian Empire
- Died: 1993 (aged 77–78)
- Known for: Founding the computer industry in Israel, first head of Mamram
- Awards: Kaplan Prize
- Scientific career
- Fields: Computer Science
- Institutions: Mamram, Rafael Advanced Defense Systems

Mordehai Kikayon (Hebrew: מרדכי קיקיון, also transliterated as Mordechai Kikion) (1915–1993) was one of the founders of the computer industry of Israel, the organizer and first head of Mamram. Before and after Mamram he was with the Rafael Advanced Defense Systems.

Mordechai Kikayon was born in Russian Empire and immigrated to the land of Israel in 1924. He was appointed to be the first commander of Mamram by head of Operations Directorate aluf Yitzhak Rabin on June 26, 1959. He was the first Israeli civilian to head a military unit.

He received the Kaplan Prize (a prize for increasing labor productivity) for the establishment of the computer center at Rafael after he left Mamram.

== See also ==
- Kikoin, for a possible origin of the surname
