= Israel Defense Forces Emblem =

Primary insignia of the Israeli military

- IDF Emblem, containing a sword wrapped in an olive branch inside a Star of David
- Proportion: 3:4
- Adopted: 1948

The Israel Defense Forces Emblem is the primary symbol representing the Israel Defense Forces (IDF).

== History ==
The IDF emblem was adopted when the IDF was first established in 1948. It was designed by Otte Wallish and Arieh El-Hanani, with El-Hanani's sword and branch design forming the basis from which Wallish worked to create the modern design.

The center of the emblem contains a sword wrapped in an olive branch inside a Star of David, with a banner containing the words Israel Defense Forces underneath. The olive branch wrapped sword was the symbol of the Haganah, a pre-statehood paramilitary force and the IDF's primary predecessor organization. The sword in the emblem symbolizes combat, while the olive branch symbolizes the yearning for peace. The Star of David is a symbol of the Jewish tradition, and represents the Jewish people and their history. Many of these elements reappear in other IDF symbols.

In 1993, the IDF itself was renamed in its original Hebrew so that the grammar was more correct by adding the prefix "ha-" (ה, meaning "the") to the second word so that "Tzva Haganah leYisrael" became "Tzva Hahaganah leYisrael." It was not until 2022 that the IDF updated its emblem to acknowledge this change.

== See also ==
- Israel Defense Forces insignia

== Bibliology ==
- Furlan, M. (1986). Israel Defense Forces Insignia. Canada: Militaria House. p. 68. ISBN 978-0929757124.
- Katz, Sam; Ronald Volstad (1988). Israeli Army since 1948. United Kingdom: Osprey Publishing. p. 64. ISBN 978-0-85045-837-4.
- Katz, Sam; Ronald Volstad (1986). Israeli Elite Units since 1973. United Kingdom: Osprey Publishing. p. 64. ISBN 978-0-85045-687-5.
- Fridman, A. (2010). Jewish Cap Badges: British/Palestine and Israel Defense Forces. Israel. p. 60.
- Lubman, Roman; Shapiro Guy (2011). Israeli Defense Forces and Law Enforcement Hat Badges Catalog. Israel, Jerusalem. p. 92.
