= Lotem Unit =

Lotem (Hebrew: לוטם), abbreviation for Unit for Telecommunications and Information Technology (Hebrew: החטיבה להתעצמות טכנולוגית מבצעית), originally Unit for Communication and Information Technology (Hebrew: היחידה לתקשוב וטכנולוגיות מידע) is a technological-operational unit within the IDF's C4I Corps. It provides platforms and develops systems in its areas of expertise for various IDF units and other security bodies. The unit is commanded by Brigadier General Yael Grossman.

== Purpose and areas of responsibility ==
The unit's purpose is the initiation, development, establishment, operation, and maintenance of integrative communication systems across the entire IDF, as well as the formulation of architecture and technological communication standards for the entire IDF. This mission includes:

- Operation of command and control systems
- Operation of a software house for the development of operational systems
- Development of large-scale engineering systems
- Operation of communication systems
- Operation of computing and support for computer users
- Information systems security

=== Lotem's subordinate units ===
- Mamram (ממר"ם) – Center of Computers and Information Systems – Responsible for managing military software and computer infrastructure.
- Hoshen (חושן) – Responsible for operating the army's communication systems.
- Ma'of (מעו"ף) – Systems and Projects – responsible for planning and engineering telecommunication systems.
- Matzpen (מצפ"ן) – Military Systems for Command and Control and management of logistics and human resources. The army's biggest software house that consists of the unification of Leshem (לשם) and Shoham (שהם) units.
- Basmach (בסמ"ח) – The "IDF School of Computer Science," also known as "Basmach," is a program within the Israeli Defense Forces (IDF) that provides advanced training and education in computer science and related fields to soldiers who have been identified as having exceptional talent in these areas.

== Unit history ==
The unit was established on March 3, 2003, as a framework which integrated units previously part of the Communications Corps and the General Staff Communications Division. Its original name, chosen by its first commander, Brigadier General Yoav Even Zohar, was "the Unit for Communication and Information Technologies."

In May 2021, a badge featuring the unit's new emblem was awarded for the first time to members of the unit.

=== Commanders of the Lotem Unit ===
Name	Years active
Brigadier General Yehoo Even Zohav	2003–2005
Brigadier General Ofir Shoham	2005–2010
Brigadier General Ayala Hakim	2010–2013
Brigadier General Daniel Bren	2013–2016
Brigadier General Rami Malachi	2016–2019
Brigadier General Omer Dagan	2019–2023
Brigadier General Yael Grossman	2023–Present
