= Yitzhak Harel =

- יצחק הראל
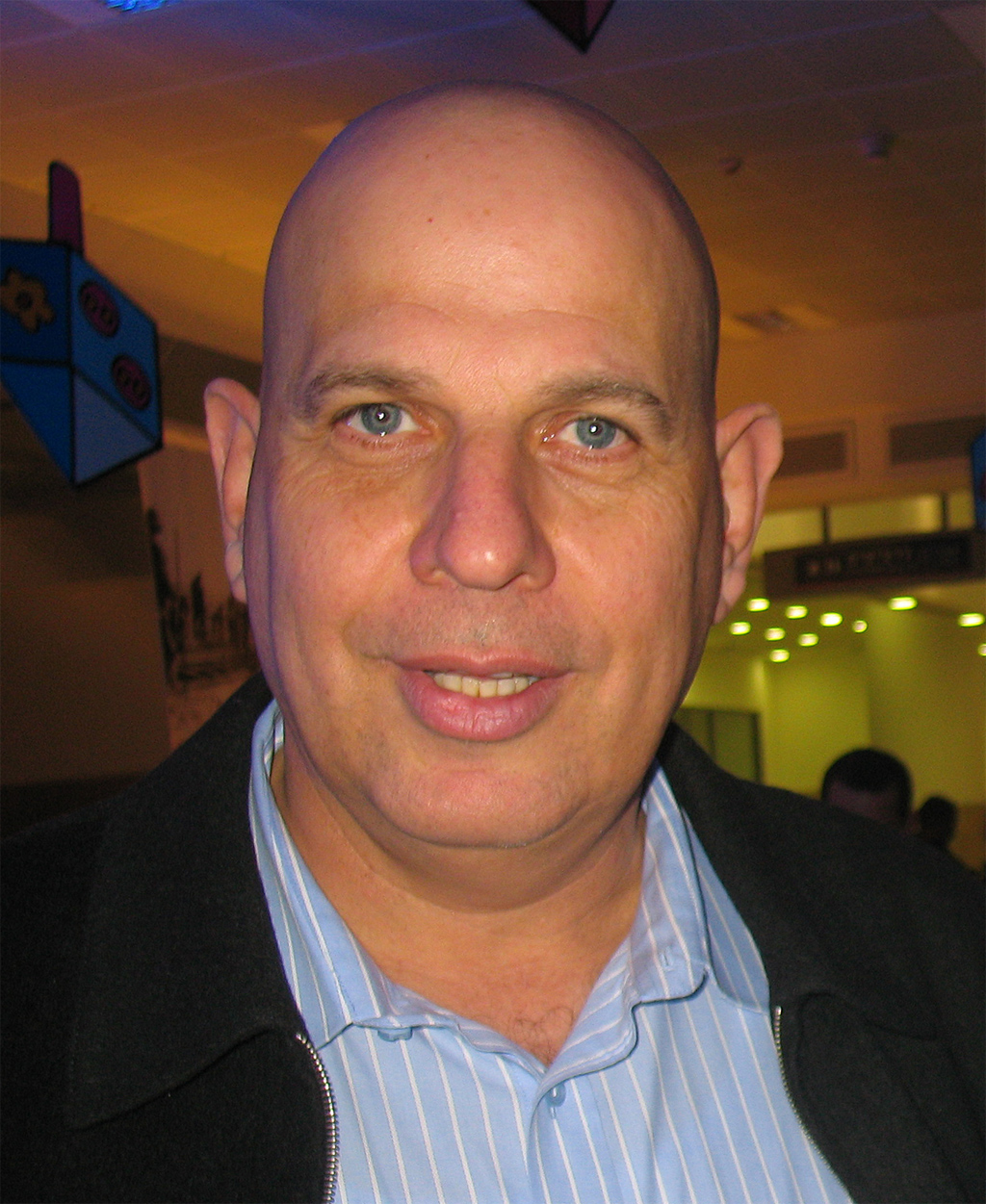
- Born: 1957 (age 68–69); Netanya, Israel
- Military career
- Allegiance: Israel
- Branch: Planning Directorate
- Service years: 1975—2006
- Rank: Aluf
- Nickname: Haki
- Commands: 7th Brigade, 162nd Division, Computer Services Directorate
- Conflicts: First Lebanon War, Second Lebanon War
- Other work: CEO of Israel Railways

Aluf Yitzhak "Haki" Harel (Hebrew: יצחק הראל; born 1957) is the CEO of Israel Railways and former major general in the Israel Defense Forces. His last command post was the Planning Directorate.

Harel was born as Yitzhak Schwartz in Netanya, Israel, and grew up in Haifa and Safed. He graduated from the University of Haifa with a B.A. in state affairs and also studied at the IDF Command and Administration Academy.

Harel joined the IDF's Combat Engineering Corps in 1975 and advanced through the ranks in the Armored Corps. He became a battalion commander at the age of 27, and at the age of 34 commanded the 7th Brigade. In 2002, Harel was promoted to the rank of major general as the commander of the Northern Corps (a wartime post), and in 2003 he became the first Computer Services Directorate chief. In December of the same year he entered his final post as head of the Planning Directorate. He retired from the IDF in August 2006.

Yitzhak Schwartz married Dafna in 1981 and they changed their surname to Harel, looking for a Hebrew name. As of December 2008, he has 2 children and lives in Modi'in-Maccabim-Re'ut.
