= Eran Niv =

IDF officer

- ערן ניב
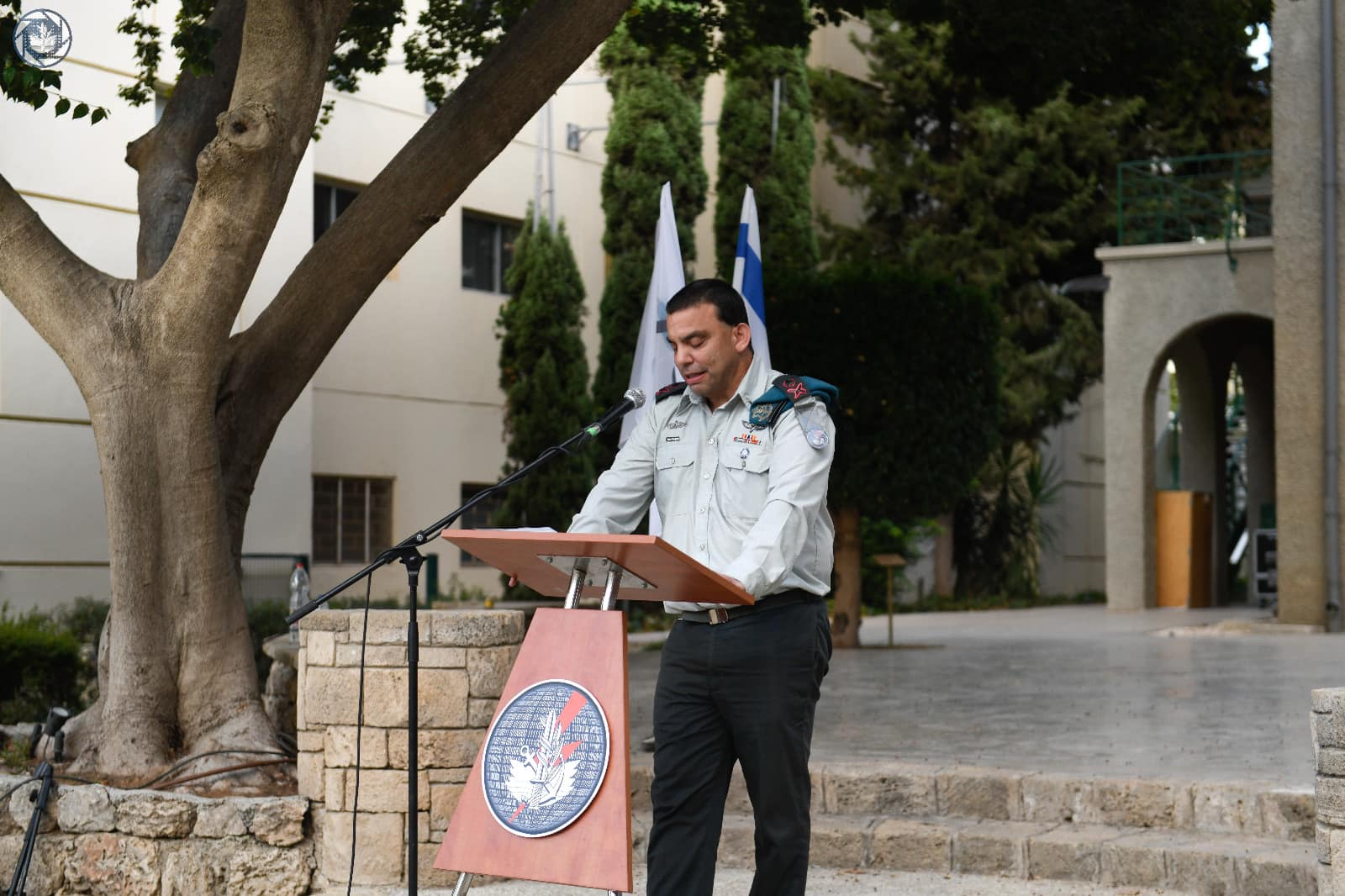
- Born: Israel
- Military career
- Allegiance: Israel
- Branch: Israel Defense Forces
- Service years: 1989–present
- Rank: Aluf (major general)
- Conflicts: South Lebanon conflict (1985–2000); First Intifada; Second Intifada; 2006 Lebanon War; Operation Cast Lead; Operation Pillar of Defense; Operation Protective Edge; Operation Guardian of the Walls

Eran Niv (Hebrew: ערן ניב; born in 1970) is an IDF officer with the rank of Aluf, serving as head of the C4I & Cyber Defense Directorate. Previously he served as head of the Shiloch Corps in the Planning Directorate, commander of the Judea and Samaria Division, head of the Ground Forces Human Resources Branch, commander of Bahad 1, commander of Brigade 55 and commander of the Ephraim Brigade.

== Biography ==
Niv, son of Aharon and Yosefa (Tripolsky), was born and raised in Kibbutz Erez, which his Palmach veteran parents were among the founders. He enlisted into the IDF in 1989, volunteered for the Paratroopers Brigade through the gar'in nahal program and was assigned to Battalion 50.

In the paratroopers he underwent infantry training and a squad leaders course. When he finished the squad leaders course, the gar'in nahal program was transferred from the paratroopers to the Nahal Brigade, and he was appointed a squad leader in Battalion 932. He later attended the infantry officer's course. Upon completing the course he returned to Battalion 932 as a platoon leader. Later he served as a team leader in the Nahal reconnaissance unit. He then served as a platoon leader in Battalion 932. He subsequently served as a platoon leader in Battalion 50. He then served as commander of the Nahal reconnaissance unit between 1997 and 1999, and led it in fighting in southern Lebanon. After completing his role, he went to study at the Command and Staff College.

In 2001 he was promoted to Lieutenant Colonel and appointed commander of Battalion 931, leading it in fighting against Palestinian terrorism in the Second Intifada. A week and a half after his battalion took up position in the Hebron area, the shooting attack on Worshippers Route occurred. He was summoned from his home during the attack. After evacuating the casualties, he organized an impromptu force near the scene of the battle, and began flanking the terrorists until killing them. He served in this position until 2003. He then served as a team leader at the Tactical Command College between 2003 and 2005. He later served as operations officer for the Judea and Samaria Division between 2005 and 2006. He then served as head of the information systems branch in the C4I Directorate between 2006 and 2007.

On May 14, 2007, he was promoted to Colonel and appointed commander of the Ephraim Brigade, a position he served in until November 22, 2009. He was then appointed commander of Brigade 55, while concurrently serving as commander of the Barak Course for battalion commanders at the Joint Command & Staff College between 2009 and 2010. On November 8, 2010, he was appointed commander of Bahad 1. During his role he initiated a program to strengthen cadets' mental readiness for possibly being surprised by the enemy, based on the "black swan theory". He completed his role on July 14, 2013. He later went to study in the UK. In September 2014 he was promoted to Brigadier General and appointed head of the Ground Forces Human Resources Branch, serving in the position until August 2017. On September 13, 2017, he was appointed commander of the Judea and Samaria Division, serving until September 22, 2019. In 2019 he established and became head of the Shiloach Corps in the Technology & Logistics Branch, serving in this position until December 12, 2021.

On January 16, 2022, he was promoted to Aluf and on January 19 he assumed office as head of the C4I & Cyber Defense Directorate.

== Personal life ==
Niv is married to Hagit and father of three. He resides in Kadima. He holds a bachelor's degree in logistics from Bar-Ilan University, and a master's degree in national security from the University of Haifa.
