= Ofir Shoham =

Israeli military officer

Ofir Shoham (Hebrew: אופיר שוהם; born 1963) is a former brigadier general in the IDF reserves, who served as Head of the Directorate of Defense Research and Development, Weapons and Technological Infrastructure (Maf'at (מפא"ת) in the Ministry of Defense.

== Military career ==
Shoham enlisted in the IDF in 1980 and is a graduate of the second cycle of the Talpiot program, an elite IDF training program for recruits who have demonstrated outstanding academic ability in the sciences and leadership potential, in which he studied for a BA in mathematics and applied physics. He also completed an MA in applied physics.

From 1989 to 1993, he participated in an operational course in the Israeli Navy, which included a captain's course. He carried out command and training positions, and served as commander of the warship INS Atzmaut.

In 1994, he was appointed Head of the Detection and Optronics Branch (גל"א) at Navy Headquarters. In 1995, he was appointed Head of the Electronic Warfare Division (מל"א). In 1997, he was appointed Head of the Electronic Systems and Electronic Warfare (מל"א) Unit at Maf'at, with the rank of colonel. In 2000, he was appointed Head of the Budget and Economics Department at Navy Headquarters.

In June 2002, Shoham was promoted to brigadier general and appointed Assistant Head of the Planning Division. This made him the highest ranking Talpiot graduate since its founding. He then served as commander of the Lotem Unit in the Computer Service Directorate from 2005 to 2010.

In March 2010, he was appointed Head of Maf'at and served in this position until June 2016.
