= Rami Malachi =

Israeli/IDF general who won the Israel Defense Prize for developing new technology

- רמי מלאכי
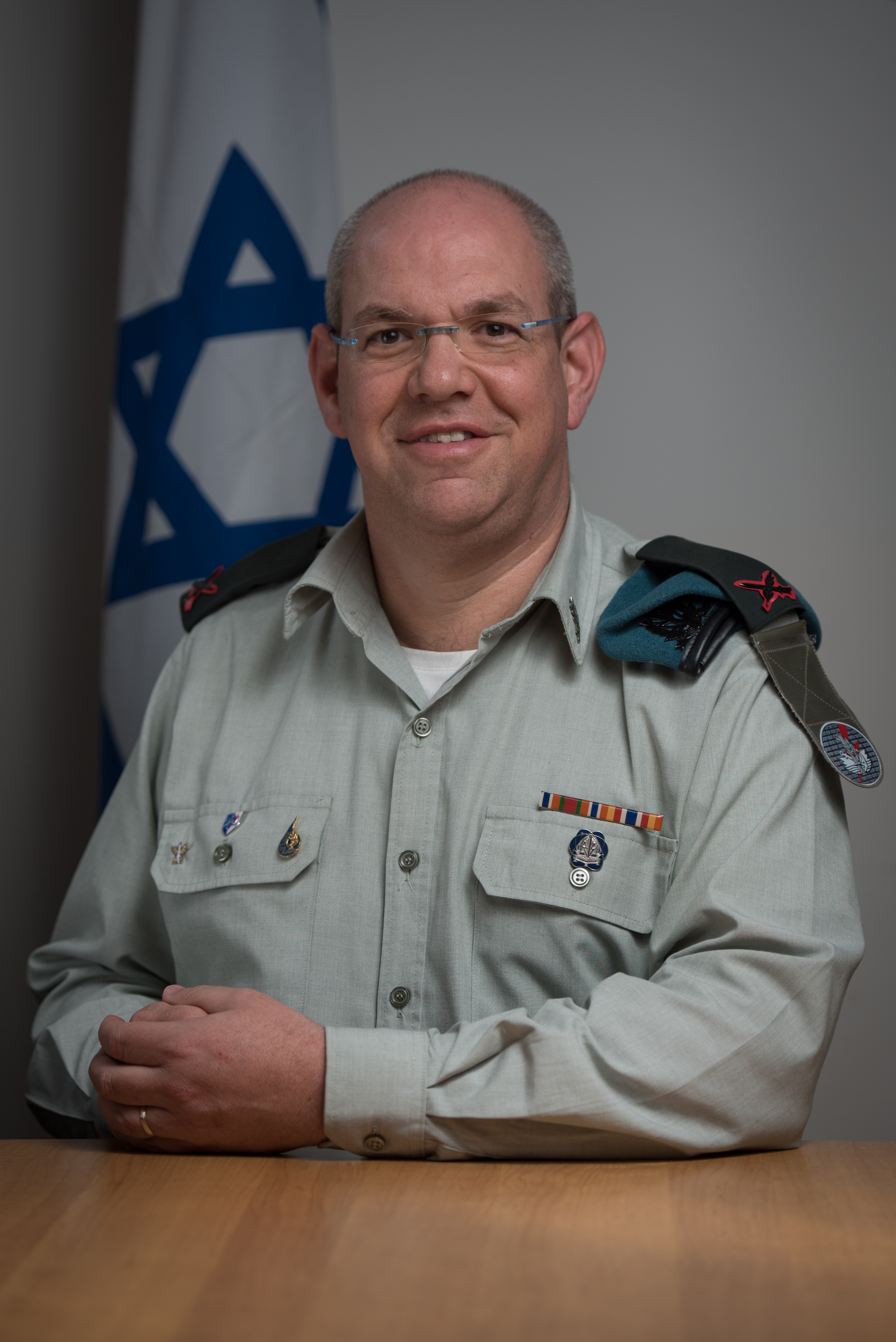
- Malachi in 2018
- Citizenship: Israeli
- Education: Technion; Tel Aviv University; University of Haifa; National Security College
- Occupation: Military
- Employer: Israeli Defense Force (IDF)
- Title: Brigadier General
- Awards: Israel Defense Prize

Rami Malachi (Hebrew: רמי מלאכי) is a former vice president of Strategic R&D and Synergy at Elbit Systems, where he won the Israel Defense Prize and former commander and Brigadier General of the Israeli Defense Force's (IDF) technology and intelligence unit Lotem. He is currently on the board of the Israel Internet Association (ISOC-IL).

== Education ==
Malachi has a BS in electrical engineering from Technion. He later earned an MBA from Tel Aviv University, and an MA in political science from the University of Haifa. He also studied at the National Security College.

== Career ==
In the IDF, Malachi served in a wide variety of positions in the fields of development of communication systems, computer systems, and command and control systems. He was the head of the Digital Ground Forces Technical Directorate (בראשי תיבות: צי"ד).

He was later promoted to Brigadier-General, and was given command of the Lotem Unit. Malachi, together with a team from the IDF, Maf'at, and Elbit Systems, won the Israel Defense Prize for their contribution to the development of the "ZID" system. In November 2019, he left his position and retired from the IDF.
