= Yehoo Even Zohav =

Yehoo Even Zahav (Hebrew: יהו אבן זוהב; born 1959) is an IDF reserve officer with the rank of brigadier general who was the first commander of the Lotem unit in the C4I (Teleprocessing) Division.

== Biography ==
Even Zahav enlisted in the IDF in 1978 and served in the Information and Communications Technology (ICT) Corps. He served as liaison officer of the Northern Command and Head of Operations in the ICT Corps. In April 2002 he was appointed head of the ICT Corps and in March 2003 he was appointed the first commander of the Lotem Unit, which included the merger of several units that had previously been in the Signal Corps and the General Staff ICT Corps. He named the unit after his daughter Lotem. He served in this position until July 2005 when he retired from army service.

After his retirement from the army, he served as division head at Amdocs until 2007. In 2008, he was appointed senior vice president of CTI Computech International in the US. In 2011, he co-founded ProVisionC4I and serves as its president. In 2016, he was appointed CEO of CTI Israel.

Even Zahav holds a BA in electronic engineering from Ben-Gurion University of the Negev (1990) and an MA in national security from Haifa University and the National Security College (1998).
