= Israel Defense Forces ranks =

Video clips showing IDF soldiers with their ranks' insignias, from the archive of the Israeli News Company of Israel's Channel 2

The ranks in the Israel Defense Forces (IDF) reflect an individual's level in the military.

IDF ranks are divided into three groups: enlisted ranks, from Private to First Sergeant; non-commissioned officer (NCO) ranks, from staff sergeant to chief warrant officer; and officer ranks, from second lieutenant to lieutenant general. The rank insignia for enlisted personnel are worn on the arm, between the elbow and the shoulder, while the ranks of NCOs and officers are worn on the shoulder epaulettes of the shirt.

Because the IDF is an integrated force, ranks are the same in all of its component branches (there is no differentiation between army, navy, air force, etc.). The ranks are derived from those in the paramilitary Haganah, which operated during the Mandate period in order to protect the Yishuv.

== Commissioned officer ranks ==
The rank insignia of commissioned officers are listed below, in descending order.

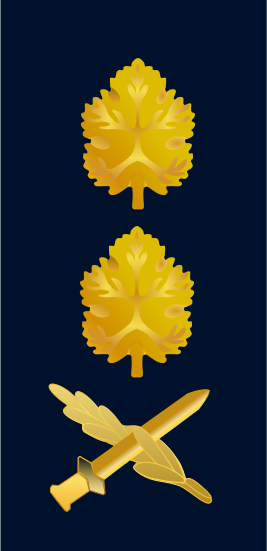
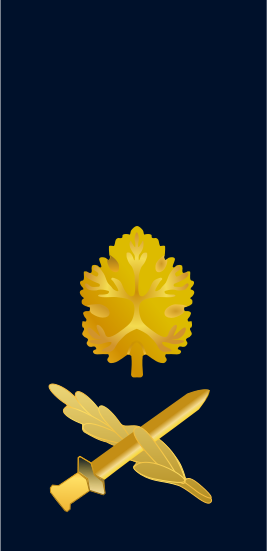
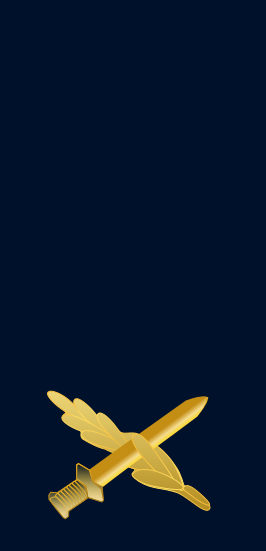
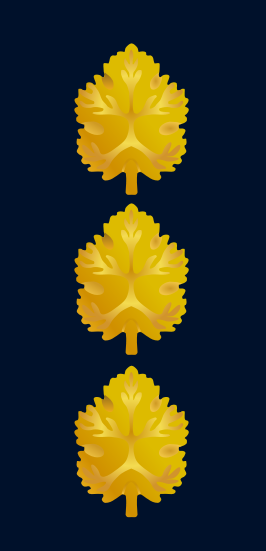
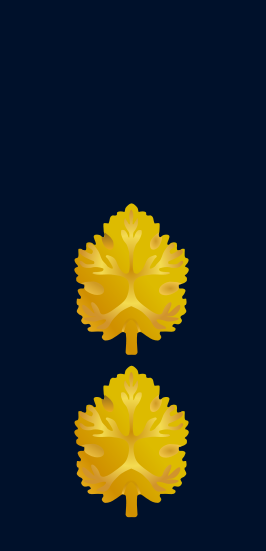
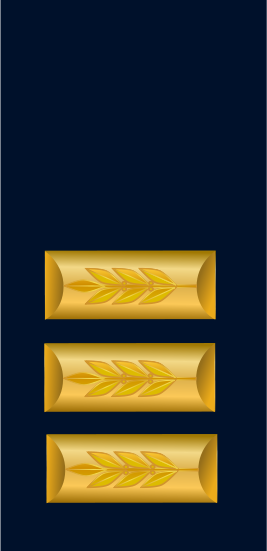
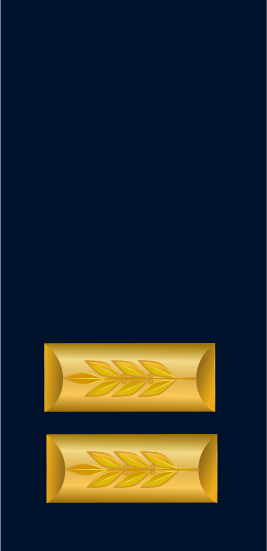
Rank group	General / flag officers			Senior officers			Junior officers
Native name	רב-אלוף; Rav aluf	אלוף; Aluf	תת-אלוף; Tat aluf	אלוף משנה; Aluf mishne	סגן-אלוף; Sgan aluf	רב סרן; Rav séren	סרן; Séren	סגן; Segen	סגן-משנה; Segen mishne
Literal translation	Master champion	Champion	Sub-champion	Second champion	Deputy champion	Master lord	Lord	Deputy	Second deputy
Official translation	Lieutenant general	Major general	Brigadier general	Colonel	Lieutenant colonel	Major	Captain	Lieutenant	Second lieutenant
Army (service)
Navy (service)
Navy (sleeve)
Air force (service)
Native name	רב-אלוף; Rav aluf	אלוף; Aluf	תת-אלוף; Tat aluf	אלוף משנה; Aluf mishne	סגן-אלוף; Sgan aluf	רב סרן; Rav séren	סרן; Séren	סגן; Segen	סגן-משנה; Segen mishne
Rank group	General / flag officers			Senior officers			Junior officers

Officers (ktzinim): Volunteers who have completed the officer's course. Officers serve for at least 36 months (3 years) for women in non-combat positions and 44 months (3 years, 8 months) for men. Positions in specialized units require their officers to serve for more than this (for example, seven years for pilots). Promotions are based on ability and time served. It takes about a year to be promoted from 2nd lieutenant to lieutenant and three years to be promoted from lieutenant to captain. Officers without a university education can be promoted to a maximum of Rav Seren (Major), with the IDF often sponsoring the studies for their majors.

Officer insignia varies by service: army officers have bronze-metal insignia (replaced with subdued black-metal insignia in 2002); navy officers gold-metal insignia or gold braid bars; and air force officers silver-metal insignia.

=== Student officer ranks ===
Academic officers (ktzinim akademaim): Special rank given to soldiers who have not completed officers' training after completing a professional education (usually in engineering, medicine, or law) and returning to service. A kama is equivalent to a lieutenant, a ka'ab is equivalent to a captain, and kaam to major. Officers of these ranks are considered professional manpower and rarely take posts of command. Upon finally completing officers' training, an academic officer is immediately awarded the corresponding "real" rank due to their experience in grade. Their insignia bars are embossed with scrolls (megilot) rather than laurel branches (aronot).

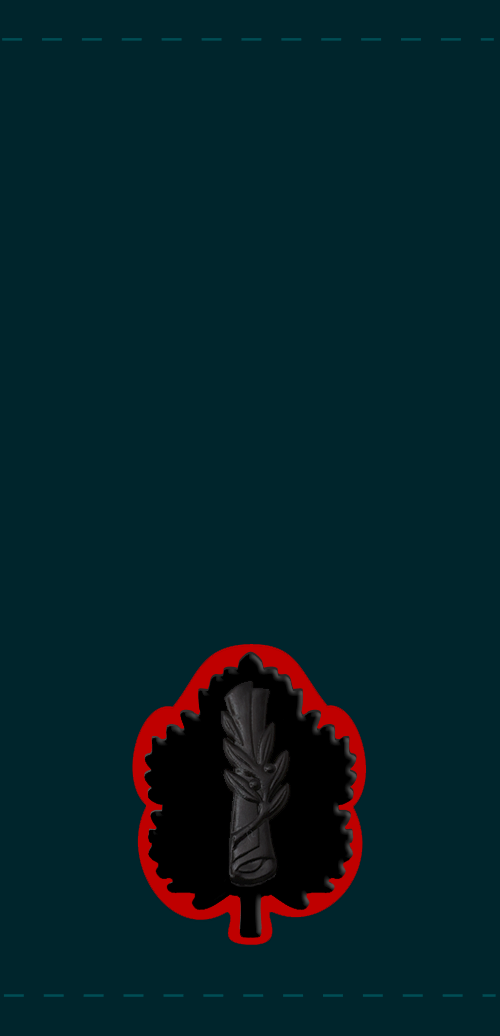
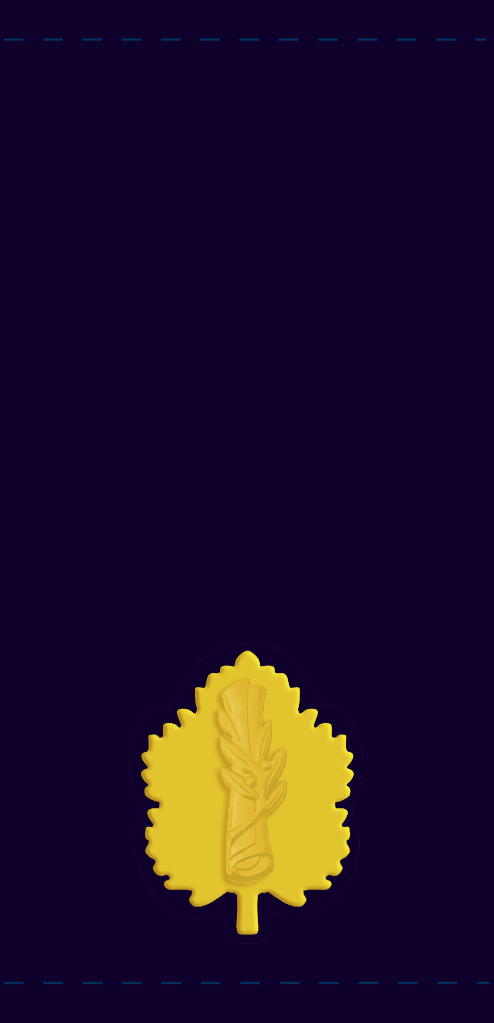
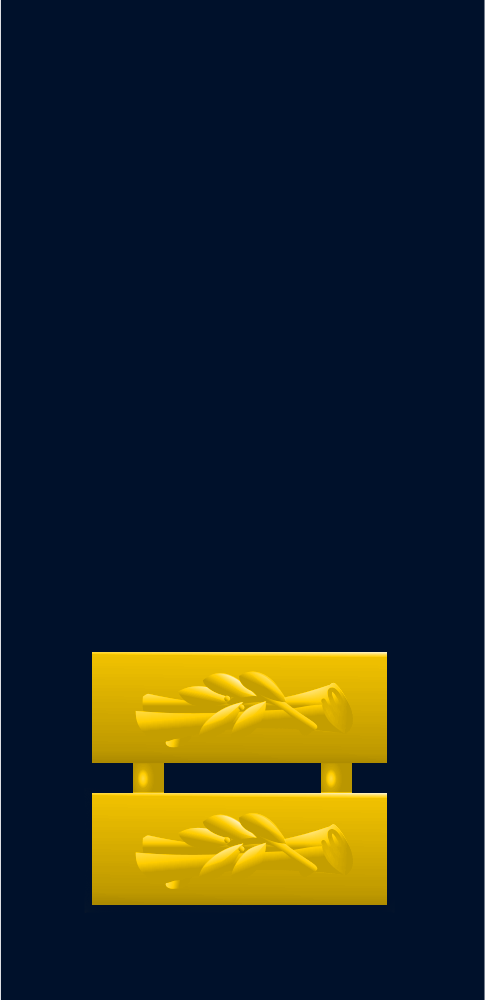
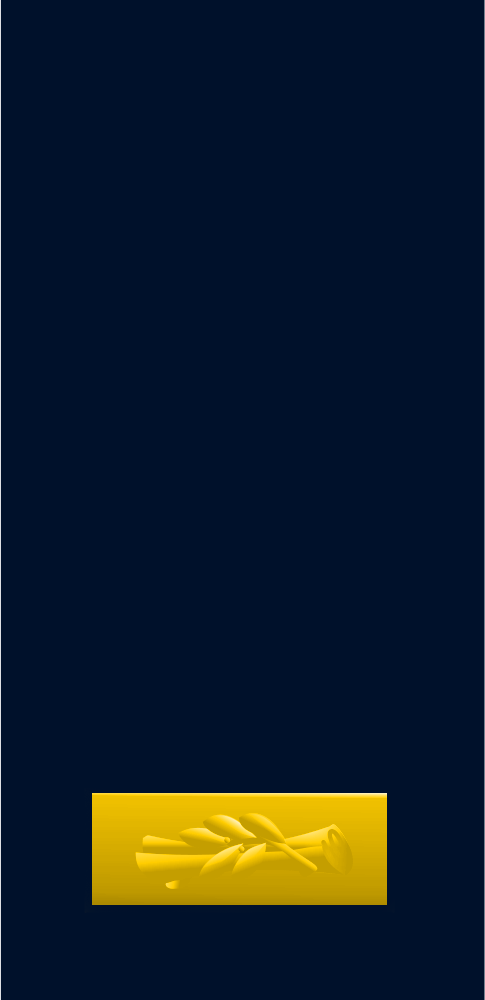
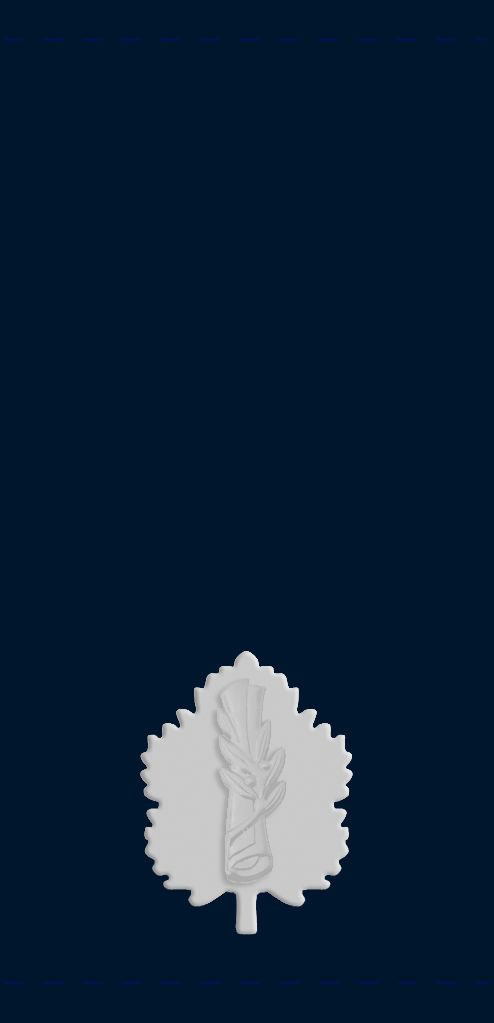
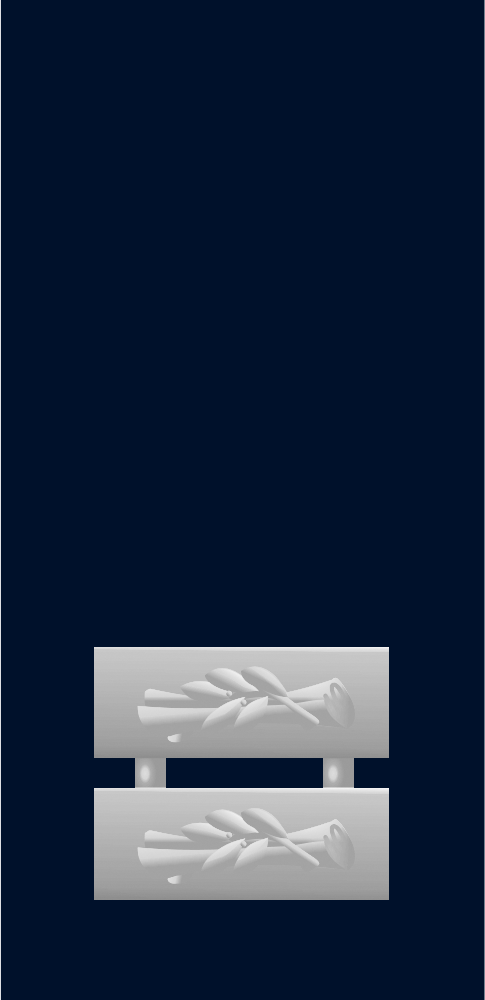
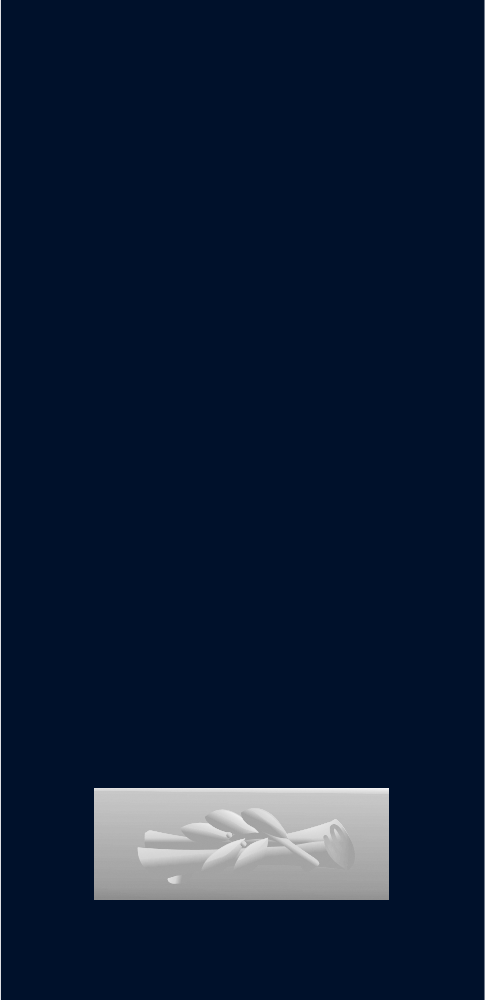
Rank group	Officer cadet
Native name	קצין אקדמאי מיוחד; Katzín akademai meyuchad	קצין אקדמאי בכיר; Katzín akademai bakhír	קצין מקצועי אקדמאי; Katzín miktsoí akademai
Literal translation	Officer academic special	Officer academic senior	Officer professional academic
Official translation	Special academic officer	Senior academic officer	Professional academic officer
Army (service)
Navy (service)
Air force (service)
Native name	קצין אקדמאי מיוחד; Katzín akademai meyuchad	קצין אקדמאי בכיר; Katzín akademai bakhír	קצין מקצועי אקדמאי; Katzín miktsoí akademai

== Enlisted ranks ==
The rank insignia of non-commissioned officers and enlisted personnel, in descending order.

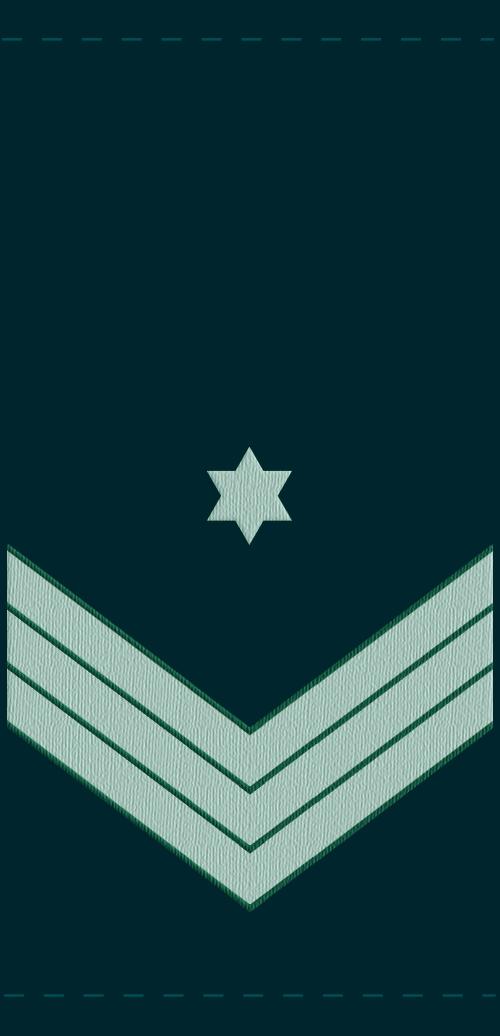
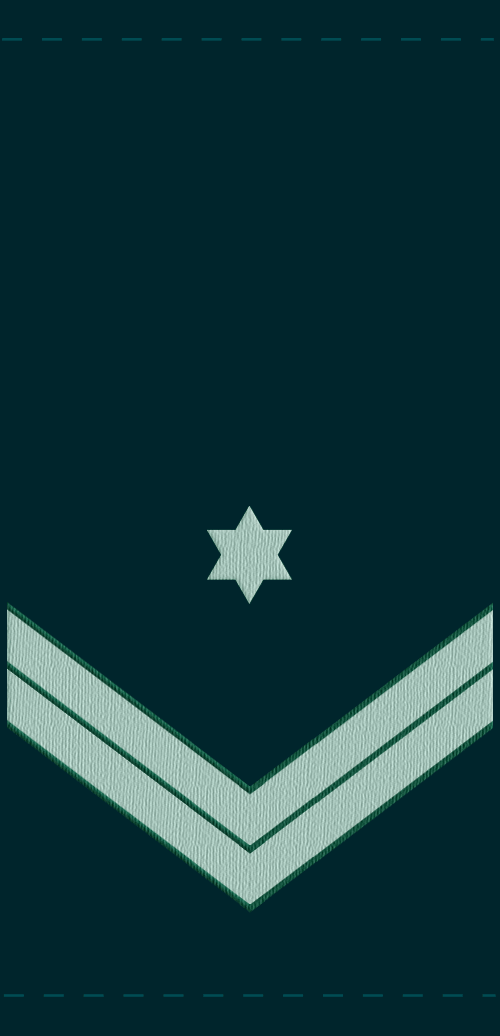
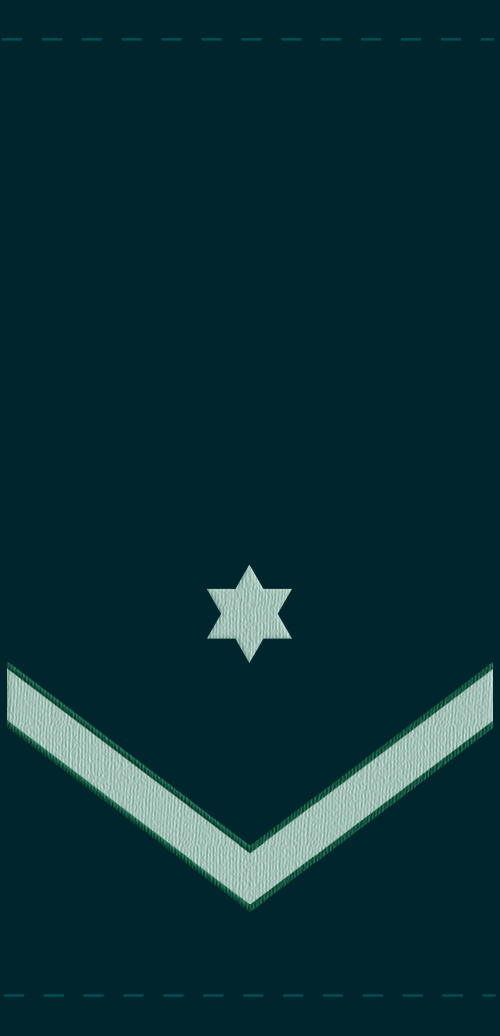
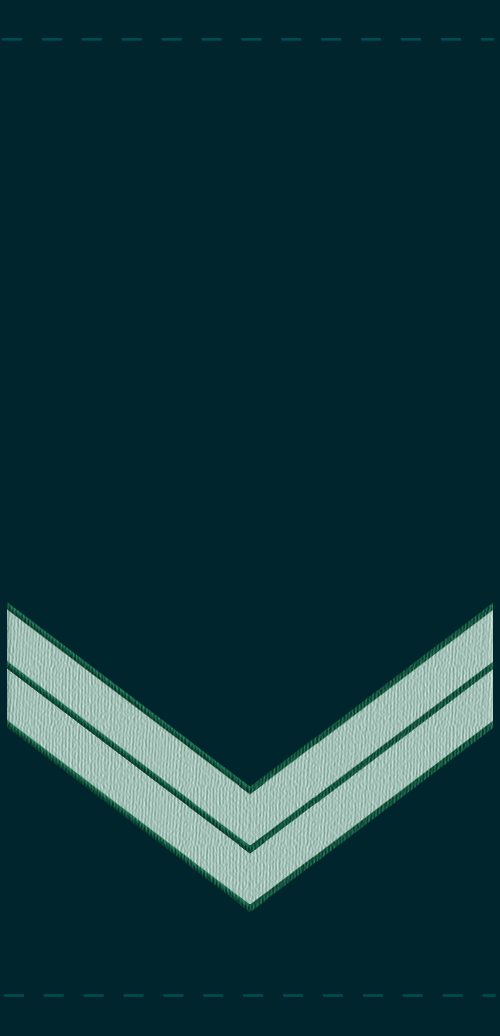
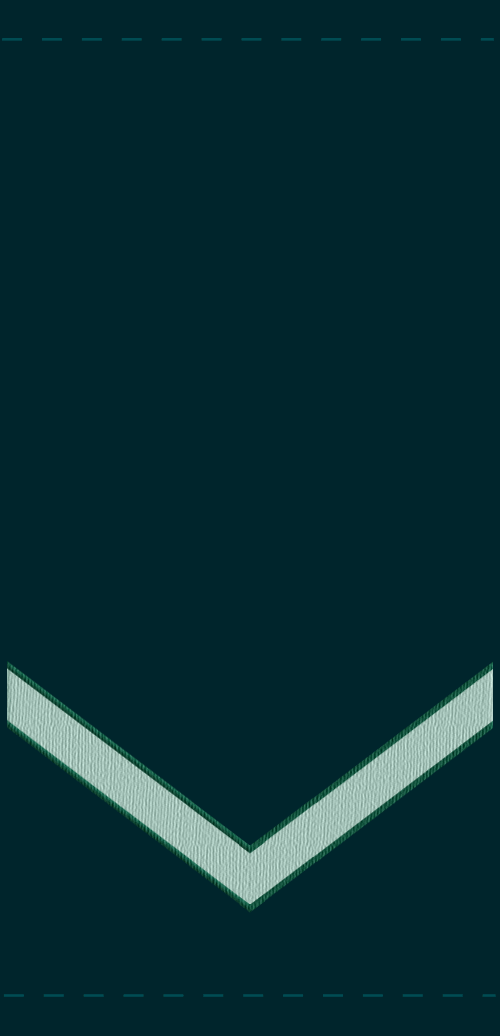
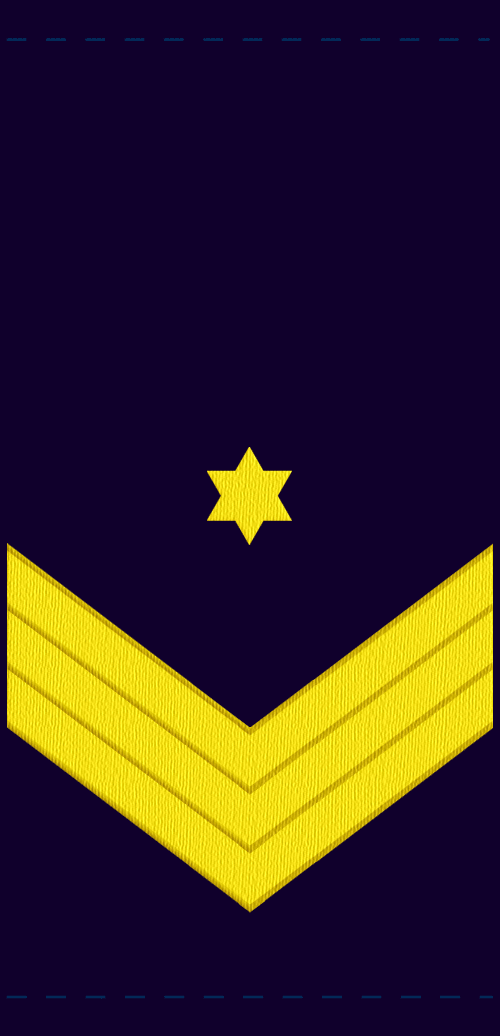
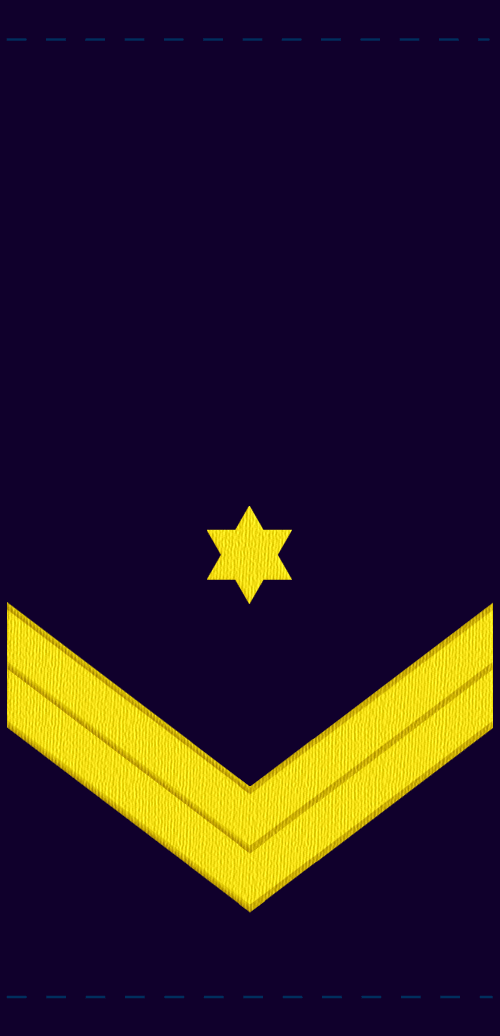
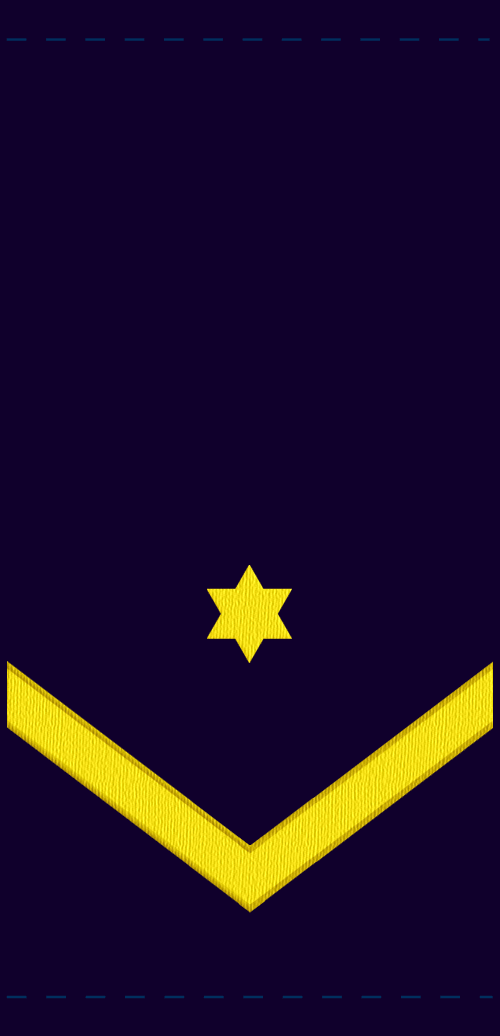
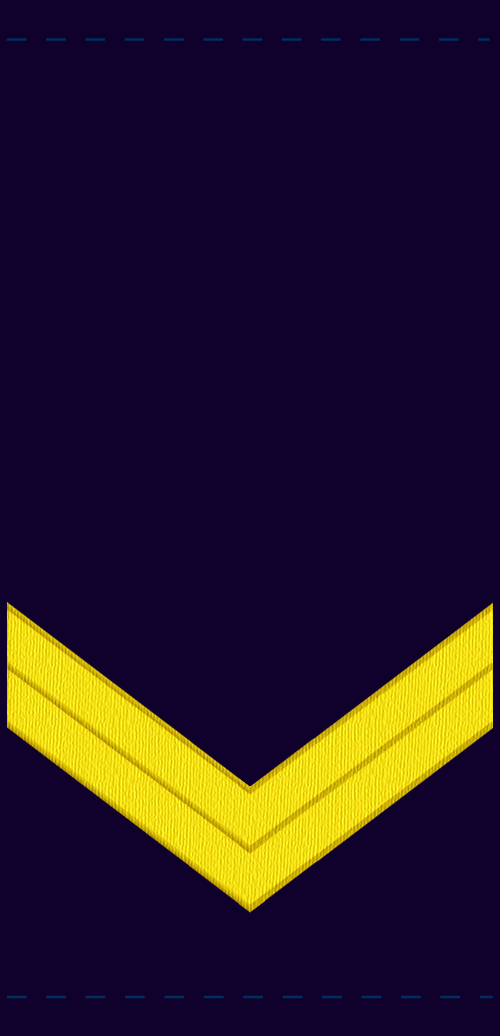
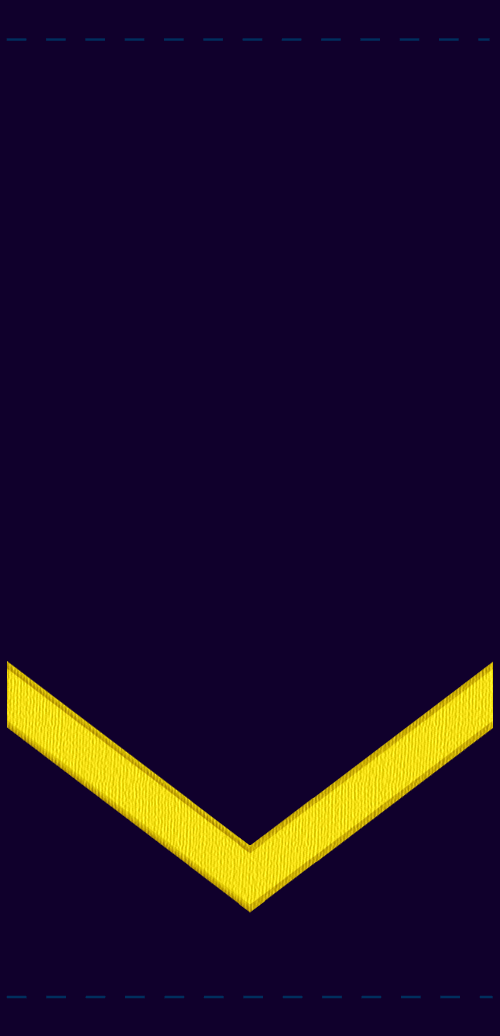
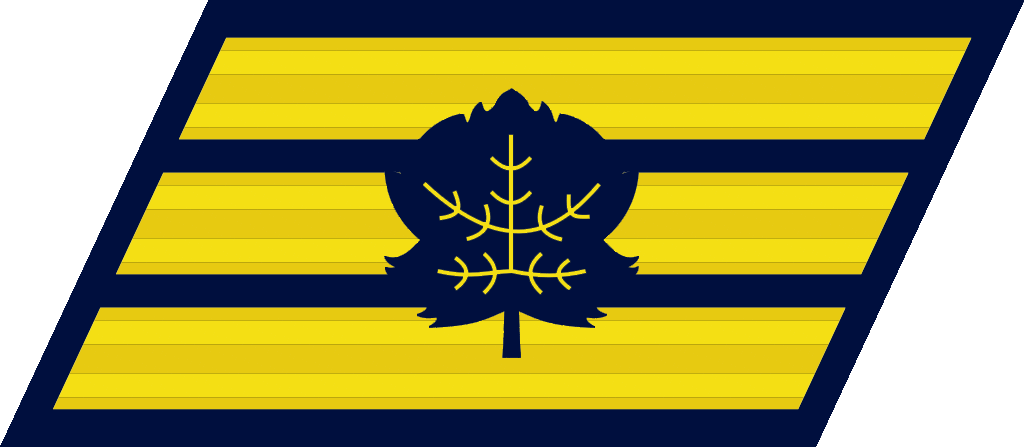
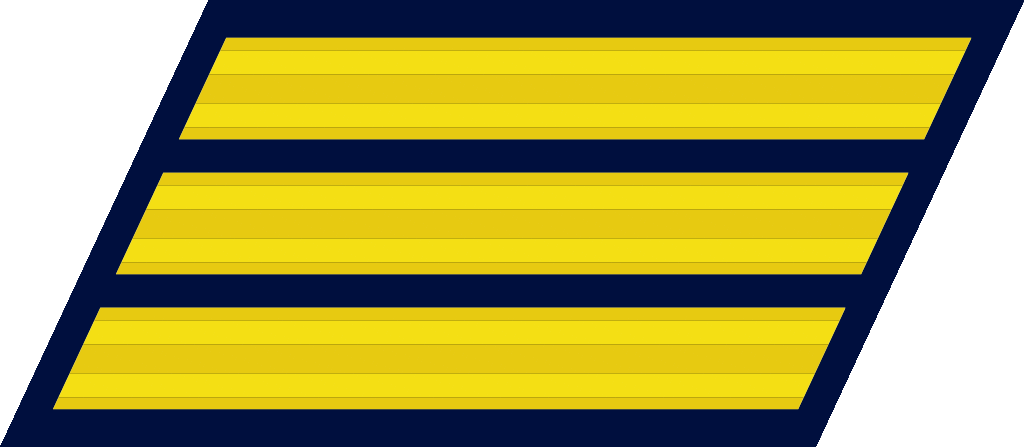
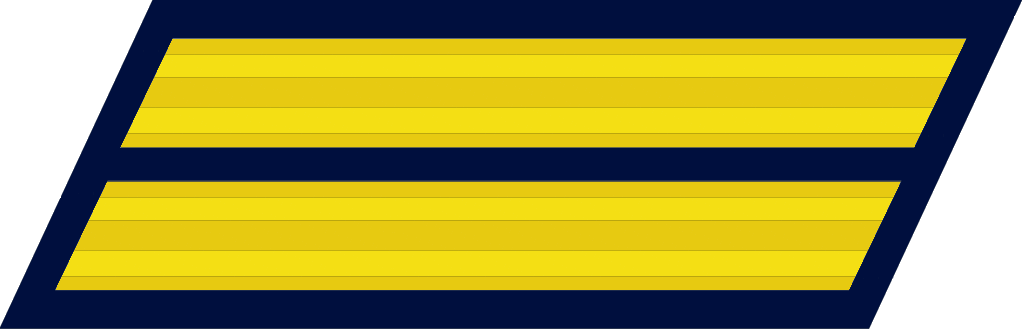
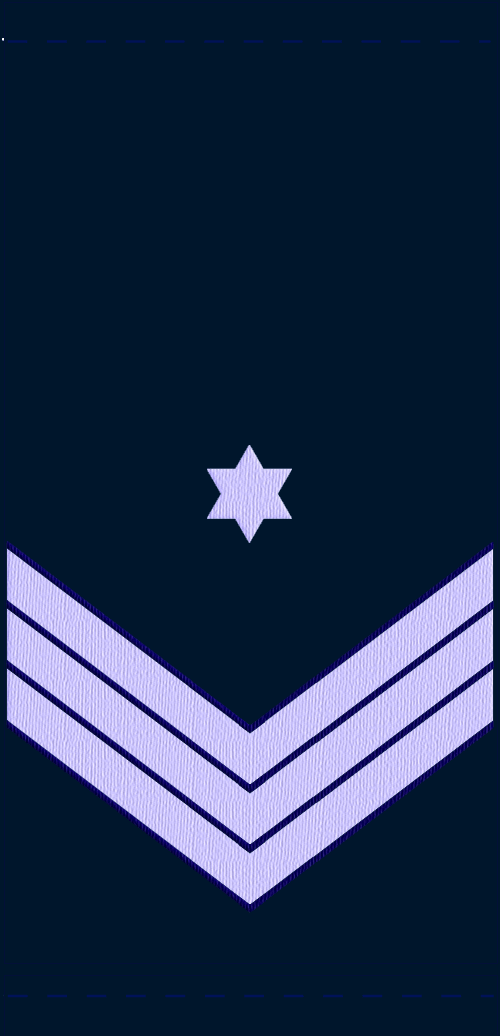
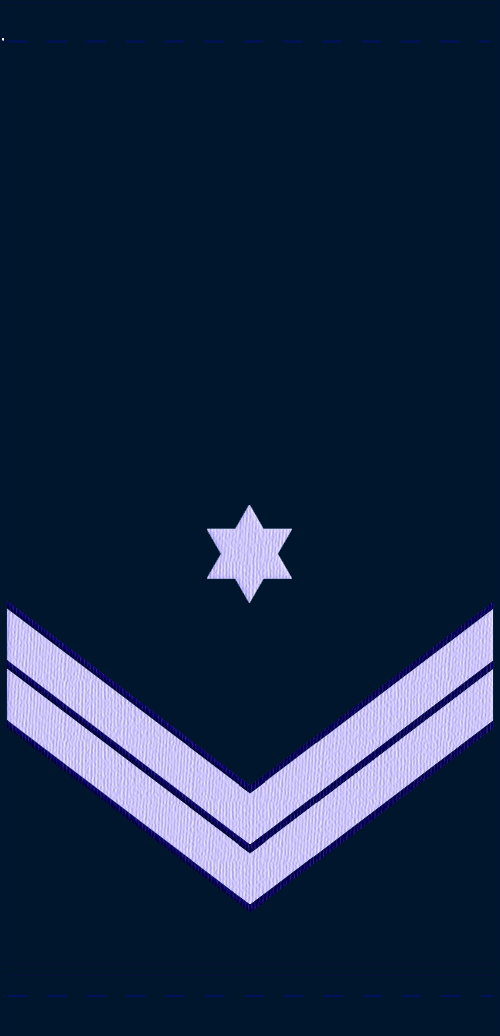
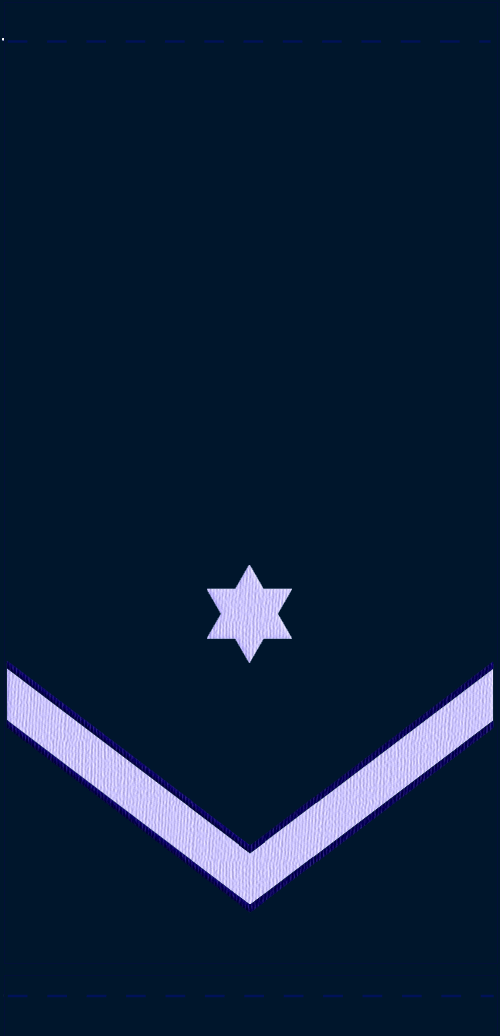
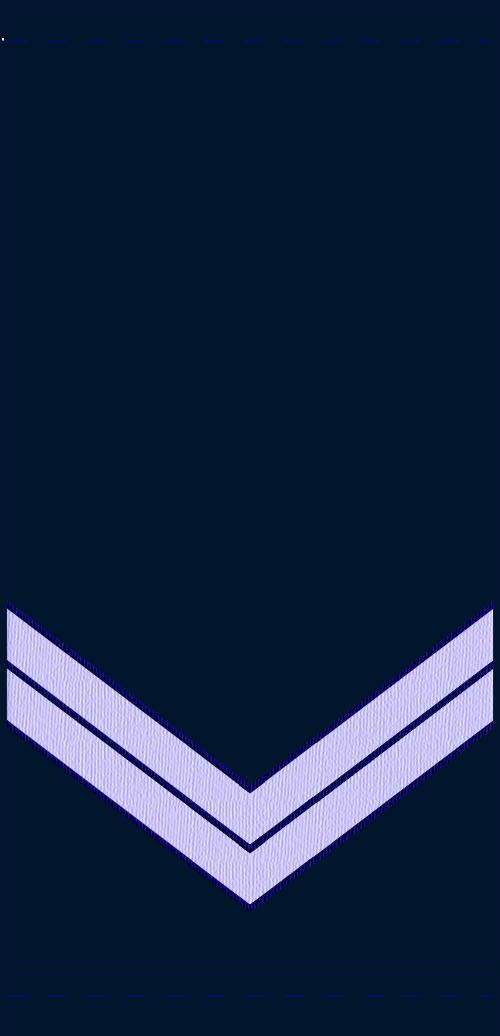
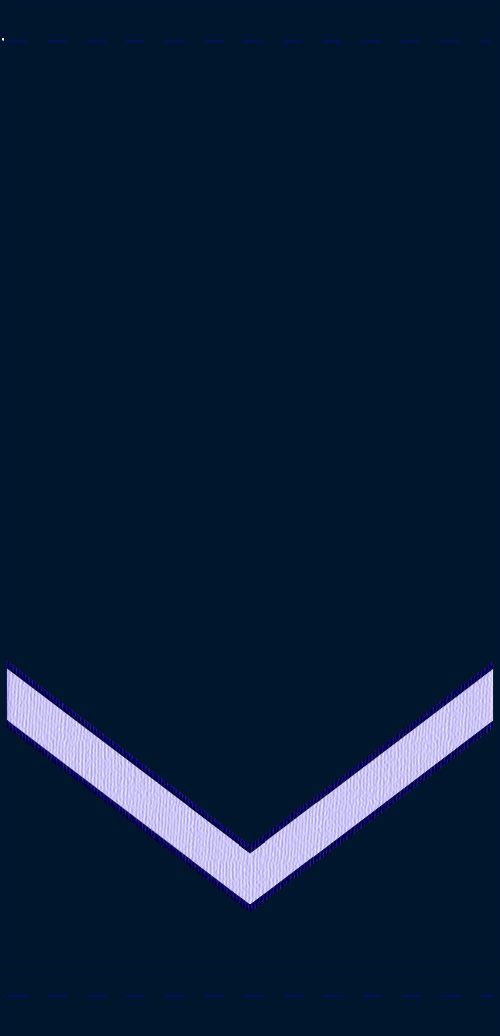
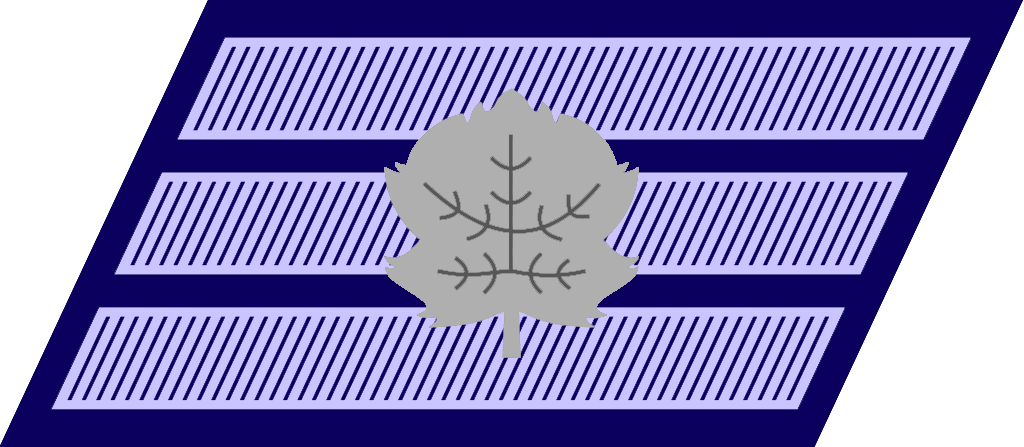
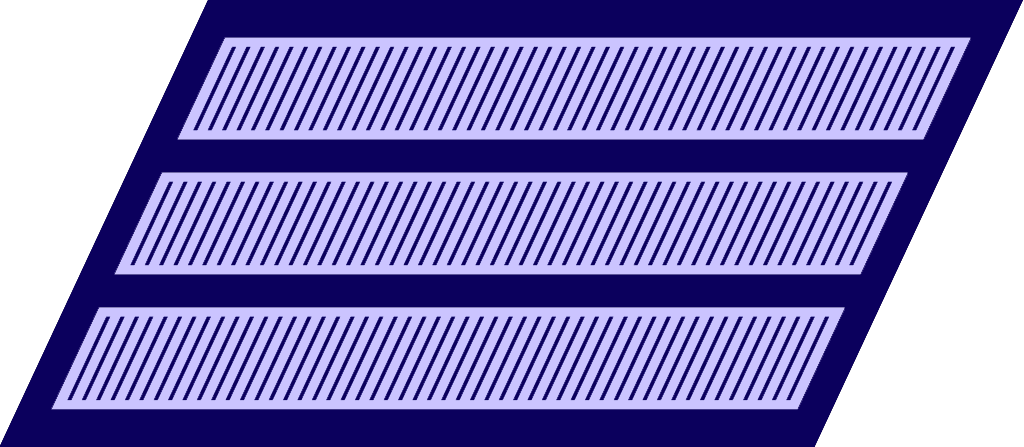
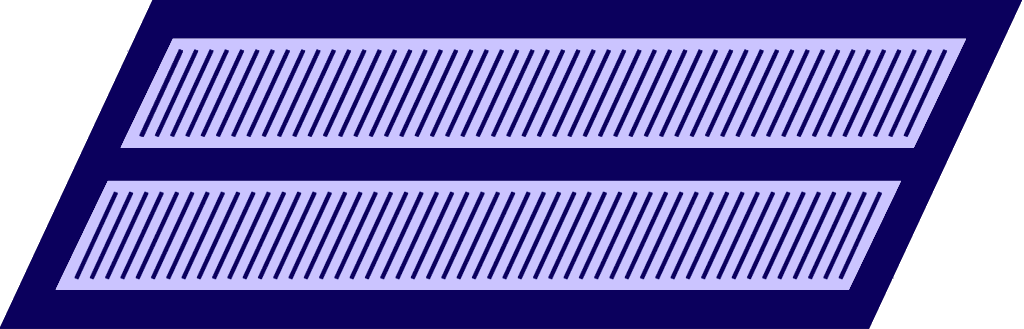
Rank group	Non-commissioned officer					Enlisted
Native name	רב-נגד; Rav nagad	רב-סמל בכיר; Rav samal bakhír	רב-סמל מתקדם; Rav samal mitkadem	רב-סמל ראשון; Rav samal rishon	רב-סמל; Rav samal	סמל ראשון; Samal rishon	סמל; Samal	רב טוראי; Rav turai	טוראי; Turai
Literal translation	Master non-commissioned officer	Senior master sergeant	Advanced master sergeant	First master sergeant	Master sergeant	First sergeant	Supernumerary lieutenant (acronym)	Master of the line	Of the line
Official translation	Chief warrant officer	Warrant officer	Sergeant major	Master sergeant	Sergeant first class	Staff sergeant	Sergeant	Corporal	Private
Army									No insignia
Navy									No insignia
Air force									No insignia
Rank group	Non-commissioned officer					Enlisted

Non-commissioned officers (nagadim): The professional non-commissioned and warrant ranks, drawn from volunteers who signed on for military service after completing conscription. They usually are assigned to head-up the headquarters staff of a unit. Samal is a Hebrew abbreviation for segen mi-khutz la-minyan, which translates as "supernumerary lieutenant"; it is a Field NCO rank equivalent to a British or Commonwealth "Lance Corporal." Rav samal translates as "chief sergeant"; it is a career NCO rank equivalent to a British or Commonwealth "Corporal" with successive ranks moving up to "Warrant Officer." Nagad is a variant of the biblical word nagid, which means "ruler" or "leader". Rav nagad is a senior staff NCO rank equivalent to the American E-9 ranks of "Sergeant Major" or "Chief Master Sergeant" or "Master Chief Petty Officer."

Enlisted (hogrim): The conscript and field NCO ranks. All Jewish, Druze and Circassian conscripts must start their compulsory service at 18 (unless they receive a deferment); Christians, Muslims, and Circassians may volunteer at 17 or older. Enlisted male conscripts serve for 32 months (2 years and 8 months) and female conscripts serve for 24 months (2 years). In the IDF enlisted ranks are earned by means of time in service (pazam), rather than by a particular post or assignment. After 4 to 12 months the conscript is promoted to rav turai, after 18 to 20 months promoted to samal, and after 24 to 32 months is promoted to samal rishon. (This means that female conscripts reach no higher than samal during their compulsory service, unless they serve in combat positions or volunteer for longer terms.)

Field NCOs (samal and samal rishon) who command sub-units (fire team or squad, respectively) are called mashak. This is an abbreviation that translates into English literally as "non-commissioned officer". It is a term of respect like the French Army's chef ("chief").

Recruits (tironim): Upon enlistment to military service in Israel, all soldiers begin a basic training course and undergo several weeks or months of 'integration' from citizens to soldiers. This course is called tironut ("recruit training") and the soldier being trained on this course is called a tiron (or "recruit"). This is often erroneously interpreted as a rank, similar to the US Army's private (E-1); tironim are ranked as turai (private), the same rank and paygrade as newly trained conscripts.

Both officers and enlisted personnel have an obligation to serve in the Reserves after completing their active military service. Male personnel serve until 41–51 years old while female personnel serve until 24 years old.

== Obsolete ranks ==
Rank name, rank equivalent	Insignia		
ממלא מקום קצין (ממ״ק); Memale makom katzín (initials: Mamak) (Acting officer or aspirant; A brevet officer ranking below a junior lieutenant) (Memale makom translates as "substitute", and katzin means "officer") (Memale makom literally translates as "filling in the place") [Existed from the 1960s until 1994]			
רב-נגד משנה (רנ״ם); Rav nagad mishne (initials: Ranam) (Warrant officer, senior specialist professional) (it translates as "junior chief warrant officer" or "junior chief NCO"); In practice the rank is not used	Army	Air Force	Navy
סמל בכיר (סמ״ב); Samal bakhír (initials: Samab) (First Sergeant, it translates as "Senior Sergeant") [Existed 1948–1952; no longer in use. (See comments in notes in the bottom)]			
רב טוראי ראשון (רט״ר); Rav turái rishón (initials: Ratár) (First corporal, it translates as "chief private first class") [Existed 1972–1982; no longer in use. (See comments in notes in the bottom)]			
טוראי ראשון (טר״ש); Turai rishon (initials: Tarash) (Private E-3 or private first class) [Existed until 1999; no longer in use. (See comments in notes in the bottom)]			

The rank of memale makom katzín, initials: Mamak (ממלא מקום קצין) or "substitute officer", was created in the 1960s. The rank was considered below a 2nd lieutenant (initials: sagam). It indicated a cadet in the Israeli army who had finished the basic preparation for an officer rank (קורס קצינים בסיסי), but for some reason abandoned their studies, failed to complete the professional officer preparation (השלמה חיילית), or completed it with a minimal passing grade but was still found worthy of command. They occupied the lowest officer posts until a normal officer rank was found for the position. Those who finished the officer preparation with a minimal passing grade and were substituting in a command position were eligible for promotion to normal officer rank after a set period. It was discontinued in 1994.

The rank of Samal Bakhír, initials: Samab ("Senior Sergeant") was used from 1948 to 1952. It was the equivalent of a US Army First Sergeant. It was replaced by the rank of Rav Samal Yekhidati ("Unit Senior Sergeant"), similar to a British or Commonwealth Army Warrant Officer II (Company Sergeant Major).

The rank of rav turái rishón, initials: Ratash, or "chief private first class", was used from 1972 to 1982. There was an expansion of staff NCO ranks during this period and the higher rank was offered to conscripts who planned to enlist after completing their national service.

The rank of turai rishon, initials: Tarash, or "private first class", was disestablished in the Regular IDF in 1990. It still continued to be used in the Reserves until it was finally discontinued in 1999. Privates now retain their rank until promoted to corporal, usually after 10 months of peacetime service or 6 months for support roles or 4 months for combatants during hostilities. Corporals in combat units traditionally do not wear their rank insignia, remaining without insignia until they are promoted to the rank of sergeant.

== Insignia ==
Aiguillettes, Srochim in Hebrew are worn on the left shoulder of the uniform to indicate a soldier's specific role in a unit:

- Azure: Ceremony Unit, Combat Hummer Operators, Military School student instructors in the Air Force
- Azure/Green: Combat Hummer Operator instructors
- Azure/Purple: Reserves Coordinators
- Black: Instructors in Bahad 1 (Officer School)/Instructors in the Flight Academy/Instructors in the Naval Academy/Instructors in Paramedic course
- Black/Creme: Military Rabbinate attacheś
- Black/Green: Commanders in the Squad Commanders’ Course in the Artillery Corps, Magal Unit, Combat Engineering Corps, Armored Aid, Infantry Corps, Reserves Instructors at Bahad 7, Commanders and Instructors in School for Computer Professions, Tank Commander course instructors, Instructors in Bahad 20, Platoon Sergeants in Bahad 13, Senior Instructors in Bahad 11
- Black/Orange: Combat Engineering course graduates
- Black/White: "Scientific Teaching" Officers
- Black/Yellow: Chemical Warfare officers, instructors and NCOs
- Blue/Red: Military Police
- Blue/White: Chief NCOs of a Base
- Burgundy: Courseware Developers
- Burgundy/Grey: Special-needs inclusion tutors in the Titkadmu program
- Brown: Behavioral sciences diagnostics, "Return to regular service" diagnostics (Military Police), Weekly trainee squad commanders (Air Force), Quartermaster NCOs in the Combat Engineering Corps and Magal Unit Bases
- Dark Blue: Air Force Intelligence Instructors, Psychotechnical diagnostics, Navy Instructors, Platoon Sergeants at Bahad 7.
- Green: Section/Squad Commanders
- Green/Blue: Soldiers responsible for the recruitement process
- Green/Purple: Service Rights Attaché instructors
- Green/Red: Emergency population instructors
- Green/White: Instructors in the Military Intelligence Directorate
- Grey: Educators/Teachers (in the Education and Youth Corps)
- Orange/Azure: Search and Rescue officers, instructors and NCOs
- Purple: Service Rights Attaché
- Red: IDF Orchestra (right shoulder), Navy Instructor (left shoulder), Apprentice-Responsible (left shoulder, only during training)
- Red/White: Ram 2 NCOs
- White: Security Guards, Discipline Attaché (Navy)
- Yellow/White: Field Intelligence Instructors
- Yellow/Blue: Nifgaim Attaché

(Only in Shocarim Cadet Schools in the IAF)

- Light Blue: Commander of a class
- Dark Blue: Senior Commander of a class/Commander of a grade
- Grey: Private Teachers

(Only in Shocarim Navy Cadet Schools in the IN)

- Red: Commander of a class
- Green: Household officer
- Red/Yellow: Base Chief
- Red/Black: Base Chief's right hand
- Red/Green: Adjutant
- Dark Blue: Class Instructor
- Red/White: head of the Cadet's council
- Dark Green/Black: Chief of security

== History ==
When the IDF was created in 1948, there were 7 enlisted and NCO ranks, and 8 officer ranks. The ranks were as follows:

Enlisted	Insignia	Officer	Insignia
Rav samal (ras) [1948–1951] ("Chief sergeant", master sergeant); Rav samal rishon (rasar) [1951–1955] ("chief sergeant first class", master sergeant)	An oak leaf within a laurel wreath on a red cloth circle (sleeve) [1948] An oak leaf over a sword within a laurel wreath (cuff) [1951] A vertical entwined sword and olive branch in a Star of David within a laurel wreath (cuff) [1968] 2 chevrons (epaulet) [1990–1998]	Rav aluf ("chief general", lieutenant general)	An oak leaf within a laurel wreath [1948] An oak leaf over an oak leaf within a laurel wreath [1950] 2 oak leaves over a crossed sword and olive branch [1950]
Rav samal (ras) [1951–1967] ("chief sergeant", master sergeant); Rav Samal (ras) [1968–Present] ("chief sergeant", master sergeant)	An oak leaf within a laurel wreath (cuff) [1951] An oak leaf in a Star of David within a laurel wreath (cuff) [1968] 1 chevron (epaulet) [1990–1998]	Aluf ("general", major general) [1950–present]	1 oak leaf over a crossed sword and olive branch [1950]
Samal bakhír [1948–1951] ("senior sergeant", first sergeant)	A small oak leaf within a laurel wreath on 3 half chevrons	Aluf [1948–1950] aluf-mishneh ("junior general", colonel) [1951–present]	3 oak leaves
Samal rishon ("sergeant first class", staff sergeant)	A small oak leaf on 3 half chevrons	Sgan aluf ("deputy general", lieutenant colonel)	2 oak leaves
Samal (sergeant)	3 half chevrons	Rav seren ("chief captain", major)	1 oak leaf
Rav turai ("chief private", corporal)	2 half chevrons	Seren (captain)	3 bars
Turai rishon (private first class) [1948–1999]	1 half chevron	Segen rishon (Lieutenant 1st class) [1948–1951] Segen (lieutenant) [1951–present]	2 bars
Turai (private)	No insignia	Segen (lieutenant) [1948–1951] Segen mishne (junior lieutenant) [1951–present]	1 bar

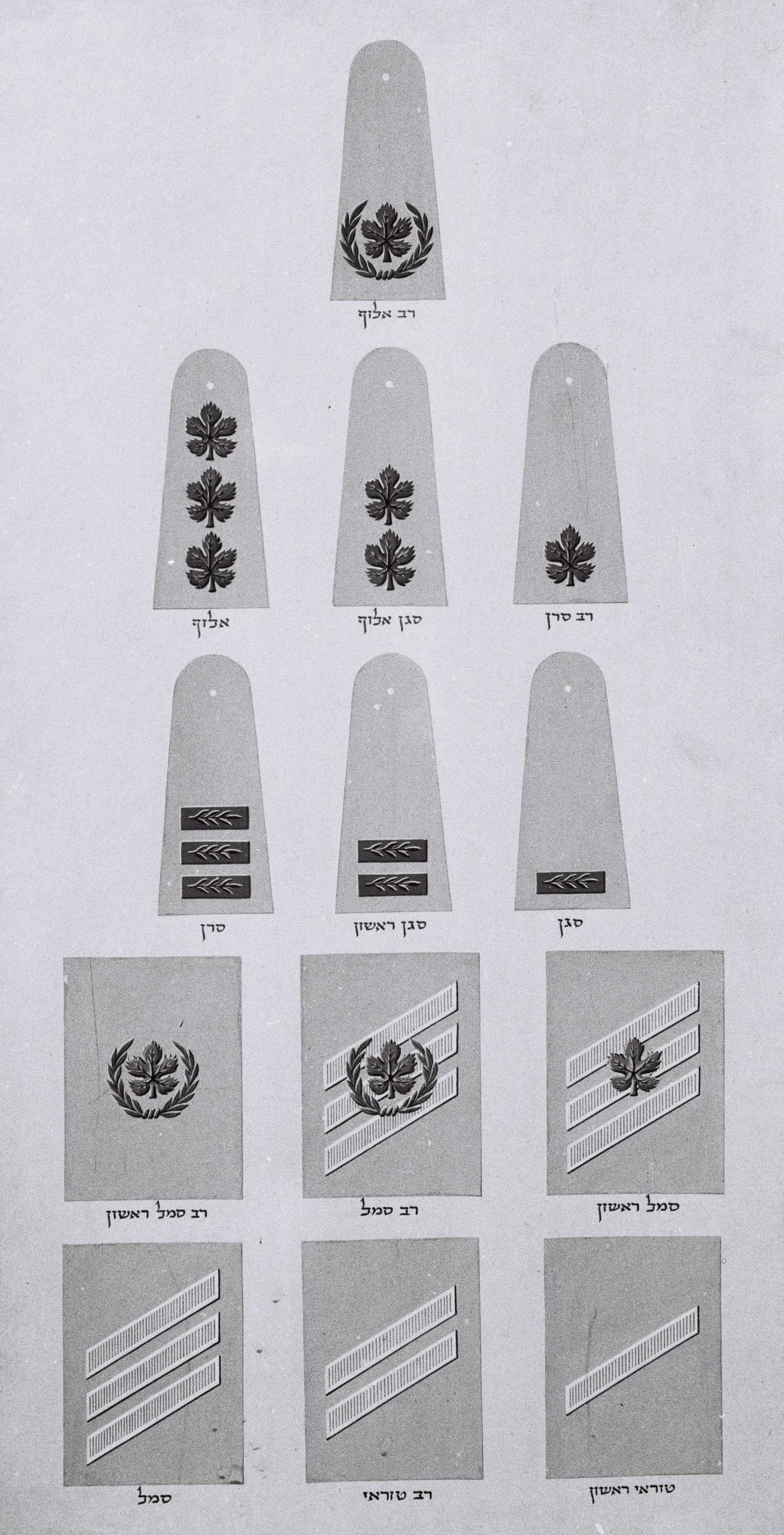
IDF Ranks in 1949

IDF Ranks and their insignia were initially influenced by the British / Commonwealth model. This was due to the average Israeli servicemen's experience in the Commonwealth forces during World War Two. This was later reformed when the IDF started to adopt a rank system similar to the United States armed forces in 1973 and the 1990s.

Rank insignia were originally cut from cloth or embroidered onto cloth patches. Bronze-metal officer's rank insignia worn on a red cloth backing were introduced for the army in 1949. Enlisted stripes for all arms were originally individual white half-chevrons with space between them. In an economy move, senior NCOs were distinguished by using the same bronze insignia (an oak-leaf or oak-leaf-in-a-wreath) as senior officers pinned to their sleeve insignia. In 1951 the Navy adopted golden-yellow half-chevrons and the Air Force adopted blue half chevrons.

A samal rishon was equal to a British Army staff sergeant / colour sergeant or a US Army technical sergeant (sergeant first class) / platoon sergeant. For the other services, the bronze-metal oak-leaf on the army's samal rishon rank insignia was replaced with a yellow anchor in a white hexagon for the Navy and a blue Star of David on a white circle for the Air Force. This was later replaced in 1951 with a gold-metal oak leaf for the Navy and a silver-metal oak leaf for the Air Force.

A Samal Bakhír (1948–1951) was equivalent to a US Army First Sergeant. The rank insignia was a small bronze oak leaf in a wreath on 3 white half-chevrons for the Army; a yellow anchor in a yellow-bordered (1948) or solid-yellow (1950) hexagon on 3 white half-chevrons for the Navy; and a blue Star of David in a blue-bordered circle on 3 white half-chevrons for the Air Force. It was replaced by the reorganized Rav Samal rank in 1951 and the new Rav Samal Yehidati rank by 1955.

A Rav Samal (1951–1967) was equivalent to a British Army Warrant Officer II (Company Sergeant Major). The rank insignia was an Oak Leaf in a Laurel Wreath. It came in bronze-metal on a red enamel backing for the Army, gold-metal for the Navy, and silver-metal for the Air Force. It was worn on the lower right sleeve of the shirt or jacket or on a leather wrist strap when wearing short-sleeve order. It was divided into Rav-Samal Miktzoi ("Specialist Chief Sergeant"; a technical NCO) and Rav Samal Yekhidati ("Unit Chief Sergeant"; a command NCO) from 1955 to 1958.

A Rav Samal (1948–1951) was equivalent to a US Army Master Sergeant or Sergeant Major. The rank insignia was originally an oak leaf in a laurel wreath for the Army, a large yellow anchor in a yellow-bordered (1948) or solid-yellow (1950) hexagon for the Navy, and a large blue Star of David in a bordered circle for the Air Force. The rank was renamed Rav Samal Rishon (1951–Present) and was equivalent to a British Army Warrant Officer I (Regimental Sergeant Major). The new rank also received new insignia made of metal: an Oak Leaf over a vertical Sword in a Laurel Wreath. It came in bronze-metal on a red enamel backing for the Army, gold-metal for the Navy, and silver-metal for the Air Force. It was worn on the lower right sleeve of the shirt or jacket or on a leather wrist strap when wearing short-sleeve order. It was divided into Rav Samal Rishon Miktzoi ("Specialist Chief Sergeant First Class"; a technical NCO) and Rav Samal Rishon Yekhidati ("Unit Chief Sergeant First Class"; a command NCO) from 1955 to 1958.

=== Early ranks of the IDF (1948–1951) ===
From 1948 to 1951, IDF Ranks for each branch of service (the Ground, Sea, and Air Forces) had unique titles and distinct insignia.

US Army Rank	IDF Army (Kheylot ha-Yabasha)	IDF Navy (Kheyl ha-Yam)	IDF Air Force (Kheyl ha-Avir)
Private	Turai	Malakh ("Crewman") [1948–1951]	Avirai ("Airman") [1948–1951]
Private First Class	Turai Rishon	Malakh Rishon ("Crewman First Class") [1948–1951]	Avirai Rishon ("Airman First Class") [1948–1951]
Corporal	Rav Turai	Rav Malakh ("Chief Crewman") [1948–1951]	Avirai Musmakh ("Senior Airman") [1948–1951]
Sergeant	Samal	Samal ("Petty Officer")	Samal Avir ("Sergeant") [1948–1951]
Staff Sergeant	Samal Rishon	Samal Rishon ("Petty Officer First Class")	Samal Tayas ("Flight Sergeant") [1948–1951]
Sergeant First Class	Rav-Samal	Rav-Samal ("Chief Petty Officer")	Samal Teufa ("Technical Sergeant") [1948–1951]
Master Sergeant	Rav-Samal Rishon	Rav-Samal Rishon ("Chief Petty Officer First Class")	Katsin Avir ("Acting Aviation Officer") [1948–1951]
Officer Candidate	-	Meshit ("Junior Officer" - Midshipman) [1948–1951]	-
Second Lieutenant	Segen	Sgan Khovel ("Deputy Officer" - 'Ensign') [1948–1951]	Pakkad Avir ("Junior Pilot Officer") [1948–1951]
First Lieutenant	Segen Rishon	Khovel ("Officer" – Lieutenant) [1948–1951]	Pakkad Tayas ("Pilot Officer") [1948–1951]
Captain	Seren	Khovel Rishon ("Officer First Class" - Senior Lieutenant) [1948–1951]	Pakkad Teufa ("Flying Officer") [1948–1951]
Major	Rav Seren	Rav Khovel ("Chief Officer" - Lieutenant Commander) [1948–1951]	Rosh Tayeset ("Squadron Leader") [1948–1951]
Lieutenant-Colonel	Sgan aluf	Sgan Kabarnit ("Deputy Captain" - Commander) [1948–1951]	Rosh Kanaf ("Wing Commander") [1948–1951]
Colonel	Aluf [1948–1950] / Aluf Mishne [1950–1951]	Kabarnit ("Captain") [1948–1951]	Rosh Lahak ("Air Command Leader" – Group captain) [1948–1951]
(Brigadier) General	Aluf [1950–1951]	Aluf Yam ("Naval General" - Commodore) [1950–1951]	Aluf Avir ("Aviation General" - Air Commodore) [1950–1951]
Chief of Staff	Rav Aluf ("Chief General" - Major General)	-	-

== See also ==
- Israel Defense Forces insignia
- List of comparative military ranks
