= C4I Corps =

Corps of the Israel Defense Forces

Flag of the Division

The C4I Corps (Hebrew: חיל התקשוב, Heyl HaTikshuv), or Teleprocessing Corps, is a combat support corps of the Israel Defense Forces (IDF) under the command of the Teleprocessing Branch, formerly the Computer Service Directorate. The C4I Corps is responsible for all areas of teleprocessing and communications in the IDF. The corps commander is known as the chief teleprocessing officer and is an officer with the rank of "Tat Aluf", equivalent to a brigadier general in the United States Army. The current commander of the corps is Yossi Karadi.

Computer Service Directorate badge

== History ==
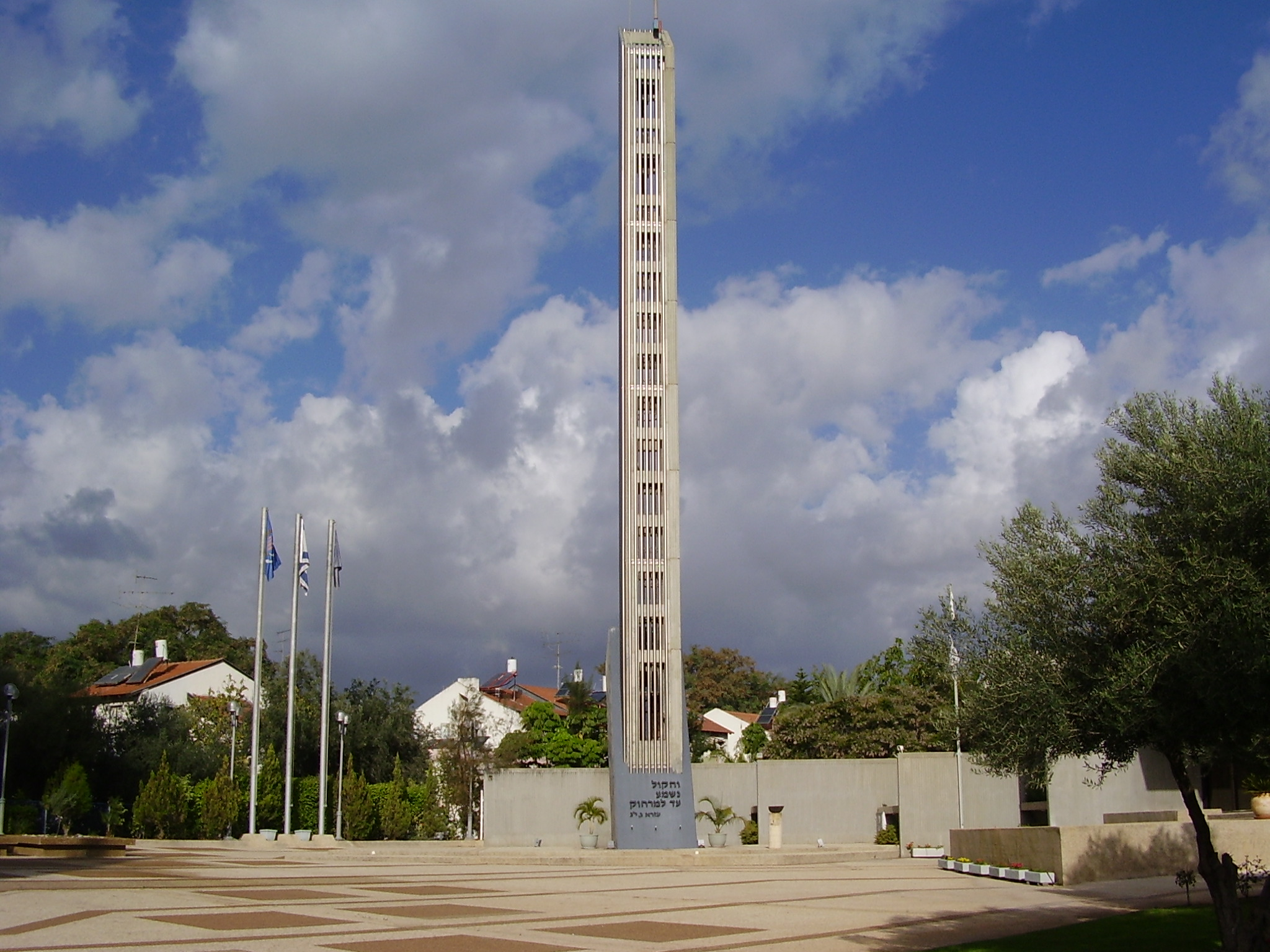
Memorial to the Communications Corps's fallen in Yehud, Israel with Bible verse "and the noise was heard afar off" (Ezra 3:13)

The Haganah Communications Service was established in 1937 and in the same year the first Morse Code radio operators’ course was held. At that time in the British Mandate, they operated 12 underground broadcasting stations. In 1938 they brought 150 carrier pigeons to the country. In 1939 the first broadcast station run by the Etzel, also known as the Irgun, was activated. During World War II, some Jewish volunteers from Palestine in the British Army served in the Royal Corps of Signals. The first communications officer course was held in 1947. During the Jerusalem blockade as part of the 1947–1948 civil war in Mandatory Palestine, radio communication equipment was installed on Palmach armored vehicles that went up to the city.

After the establishment of the State of Israel and the IDF, the Communications Corps was established on October 14, 1948.

With the establishment of the Computer Service Directorate in 2003, the C4I Corps became one of its subordinate units. In 2005, as part of comprehensive organizational changes in the Ground Forces Command, the C4I Corps together with the Ordnance Corps, Logistics Corps, and Adjutant Corps became subordinate elements of that headquarters. In 2007 it was decided to return the C4I Corps to the Computer Service Directorate. In 2008 the decision was implemented.

== Commanders ==
Name	Tenure	Notes
Ya'akov Yanai	November 1945 – November 1949	
Yitzhak Almog	November 1949 – August 1954	
Ariel Amiad	August 1954 – September 1957	
Yishayahu Lavi	September 1957 – June 1962	Corps name changed to Communications and Electronics Corps
Zalman Shalev	June 1962 – August 1966	
Moshe Gidron	August 1966 – August 1972	First commander with the rank of brigadier general
Shlomo Inbar	August 1972 – October 1975	
Yisrael Zamir	October 1975 – August 1979	
Zvi Amid	August 1979 – September 1982	
Moti Dagan	September 1982 – September 1986	
Benny Meidan	September 1986 – May 1990	
Shlomo Waks	May 1990 – September 1993	
Avihu Distelman	September 1993 – September 1996	
Herzl Hallali	September 1996 – July 1999	
Moshe Markovitz	July 1999 – August 2002	
Arnon Zuaretz	August 2002 – September 2005	Name changed to C4I Corps
Shmulik Keinan	September 2005 – September 2008	
Nahum Baslo	September 2008 – September 2011	
Eyal Zelinger	September 2011 – July 2015	
Netanel (Nati) Cohen	July 2015 - May 2018	
Yariv Nir	May 2018 - July 2021	
Yossi Karadi	July 2021 - present	
