= Mamram =

Abbreviation for Center of Computing and Information Systems

Mamram unit insignia

Mamram (Hebrew: ממר"ם), abbreviation for Center of Computing and Information Systems (Hebrew: מרכז מחשבים ומערכות מידע Merkaz Mahshevim UMa'arahot Meida), originally Center of Computing and Mechanized Registration (Hebrew: מרכז מחשבים ורישום ממוכן Merkaz Mahshevim VeRishum Memukhan) is the Israel Defense Forces' central computing system unit, providing data processing services for all arms and the general staff of the IDF.

== History ==
Formed in 1959, the unit acquired its first computer, a US-made Philco computer TRANSAC S-2000 mainframe Model 211 installed in 1961. Prior to this, the IDF made occasional use of the Weizmann Institute's WEIZAC, the first electronic computer in the Middle East. Mordechai Kikayon, a civilian, was transferred from RAFAEL (then part of the IDF) to be the Mamram's first commander. Mamram facilities soon started hosting several other independent data processing units, including the Inventory Processing Center (מענ"א) and the Manpower Computing Center (ממכ"א), and additional computers were obtained.

In 1994, the Mamram programming school, considered one of the best sources of high-quality software professionals in the world, was separated into a newly formed unit called School for Computer Professions (Hebrew: בית הספר למקצועות המחשב, abbr. Basmach - בסמ"ח). However, the school's graduates, who were and still are highly sought after in the industry, are still referred to as Mamram graduates. Following graduation, Basmach students go on to serve in various IDF units. Some of the graduates are often offered a position in Mamram itself.

The unit has also been delegated with the responsibility of assigning Internet domain names under the idf.il second level domain.

On September 20, 2017, the color of the unit's beret was changed to cyber blue to reflect the emerging responsibility for Israel's cyber defense.

=== Commanders ===
- 2023- : Colonel Racheli Dambinski
- 2020–2023: Colonel Yael Grossman
- 2018–2020: Colonel Omer Grossman
- 2015–2018: Colonel Talia Gazit
- 2013–2015: Colonel Hanan Iserovich
- 2010–2013: Colonel Noam Rozenfeld
- 2006–2010: Colonel Ayala Hakim
- 2002–2006: Colonel Avi Kochva
- 1999–2002: Colonel Zvi Gliechman
- 1994–1999: Colonel Miri Kadmiel
- 1992–1994: Brig. Gen. Giora Ulman
- 1987–1992: Colonel Eli Gonen
- 1984–1987: Colonel Yitzchak Malach
- 1982-1984: Col. Avi Peri
- 1981-1982: Col. Sarya Ziv
- 1979-1981:Col Yeosef Shiftan
- 1978-1979: Col. Moshe Nadir
- 1973-1978: Romemia HaLevy-Segal
- 1967-1973: Menachem Dishon
- 1959–1967: Mordechai Kikayon, the first head of Mamram

== Areas of responsibility ==
=== Closed intranet ===
Mamram has created the military's closed Intranet network. This network uses common WWW services, only in smaller dimensions for the use of all IDF's soldiers.

=== IDF's system network ===
MAMRAM is responsible for the management and development of the IDF's computer and network systems.

=== Fight against computer abuse ===
Mamram is responsible for enforcing computer use integrity. The ability to monitor network vandalism and abuse is an outcome of Mamram's own technical development.

=== WWW integration ===
Mamram provides IDF's WWW websites. Those websites contain interactive information used by civilians and foreigners.
