= ICT and Cyber Defense Directorate =

Israeli military cyberagency

- אגף התקשוב וההגנה בסייבר
- Active: 2003–present
- Country: Israel
- Allegiance: Israel Defense Forces

Commanders
- Current commander: Aluf Aviad Dagan

Insignia
- Flag

The ICT and Cyber Defense Directorate (Hebrew: אגף התקשוב וההגנה בסייבר, Agaf Ha-Tikshuv VeHaHagana Basayber) is the Israel Defense Forces body which charts the communication, wireless transmission, computerization, command and control of military and intelligence information in the IDF. The Directorate was created on March 3, 2003, on the basis of some functions previously held by the C4I Corps. The Directorate is also responsible for Cyber Defense in the IDF, a fact which has led to the name of the Directorate being changed to "C4I and Cyber Defense Directorate" in May 2017.

== Units ==
The C4I and Cyber Defense Directorate comprises four main brigade-level units:

- The C4I Corps.
- The Operating Brigade (Hebrew: חטיבת ההפעלה, Hativat HaHaf'ala), which deals with operational communications and electronic warfare,
- The Cyberspace Defense Brigade (Hebrew: חטיבת ההגנה בסייבר, Hativat HaHagana Be'Saib'er), which is responsible for the telecommunications of internal IDF networks,
- Lotem Unit (לוטם) , an abbreviation for Unit for Telecommunications and Information Technology).

== Commanders ==
- Aluf Yitzhak Harel (March 30, 2003 – December 20, 2003)
- Aluf Udi Shani (December 21, 2003 – November 12, 2006)
- Aluf Ami Shafran (November 13, 2006 – October 24, 2011)
- Aluf Uzi Moskowitz (October 24, 2011 – March 28, 2016)
- Aluf Nadav Padan (June 13, 2016 – February 4, 2018)
- Aluf Lior Carmeli (February 4, 2018 - January 19, 2022)
- Aluf Eran Niv (January 19, 2022 - October 28, 2024)
- Aluf Aviad Dagan (October 28, 2024 -)
