= Ksalon (disambiguation) =

Ksalon (כְּסָלוֹן) is a moshav in central Israel.

Ksalon, also transliterated as Kesalon, may also refer to:

- Kesalon (biblical), a Biblical site, Istael
- Nahal Kesalon, a wadi in West Bank and Israel
