= Simhoni =

Simhoni or Simchoni (Hebrew: שמחוני

- Asaf Simhoni (1922–1956), major general in the IDF
- Yehudit Simhonit (1902–1991), Zionist activist and politician

== See also ==
- Simhon
