= Asaf Simhoni =

Israeli major general

- אסף שמחוני
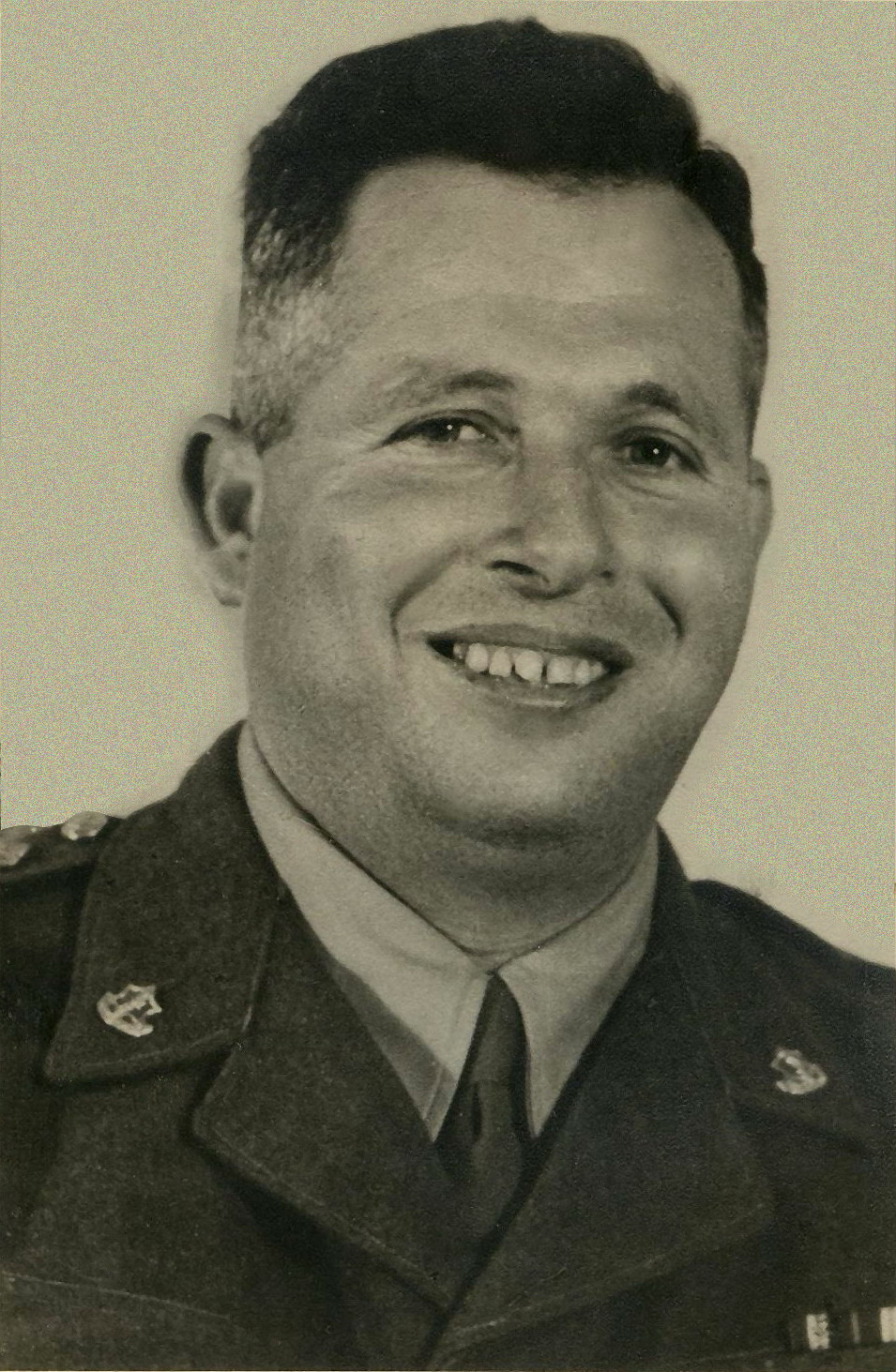
- Asaf Simhoni, 1953
- Born: October 9, 1922; Nahalal, Mandatory Palestine
- Died: November 6, 1956 (aged 34); Near Ajlun Castle, Jordan
- Burial place: Mount Herzl National Military Cemetery; 31.773889°N 35.180556°E
- Spouse: Delilah Aisrzon (m. 1943; d. 1952)
- Military career
- Allegiance: Israel
- Branch: Palmach; Haganah; Israel Defense Forces
- Service years: 1938 - November 6, 1956
- Rank: Aluf (posthumously)
- Commands: Company commander of Yiftach Brigade; Commander of Golani Brigade; Assistant Head of Operations Directorate; Head of Northern Command; Head of Southern Command
- Conflicts: 1936–39 Arab Revolt; World War II; 1948 Palestine war; Reprisal operations; Sinai War
- Memorials: Southern Command Training Camp; Military Library at Tel Aviv University; Various streets in many cities in Israel

Asaf Simhoni (Also spelled Asaf Simchoni; Hebrew: אסף שמחוני; October 9, 1922 - November 6, 1956) was a major general in the IDF, served as head of Northern Command, Assistant Head of Operations Directorate, and later as the Head of Southern Command. Simhoni headed Israel's main effort during the Suez Crisis. He died on the night the war ended in a plane crash on the way to Haifa.

== Biography ==
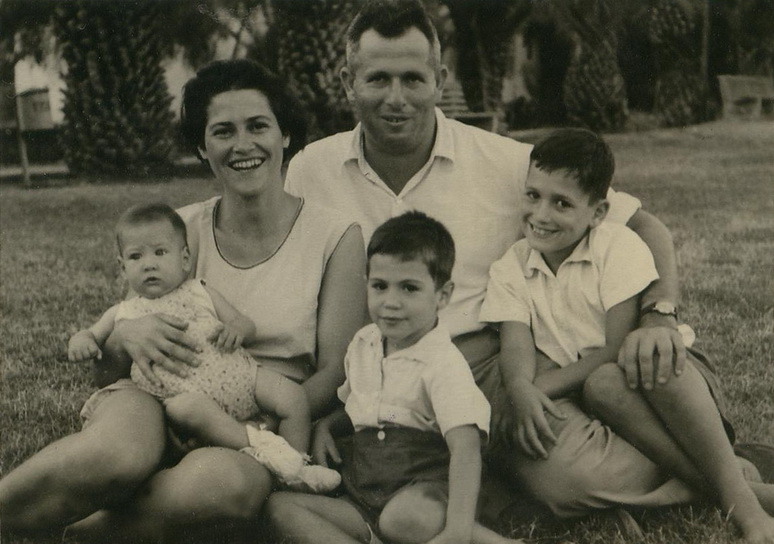
Simhoni's wife Delilah and their three children. Left to right: Yoav, Avner, YiftahTel-Yosef; 1952

Asaf Simhoni was born in Nahalal, Mandatory Palestine, on October 9, 1922. He was the oldest son of Yehudit Simhonit (Note: Her actual surname is "Simhoni"; however it was customary for Russian speakers to add a "t" (Hebrew: "ת") suffix to surnames of women) and Mordecai Simhoni, fifth generation farmers who made aliyah to Mandatory Palestine in 1921. Coming from an agricultural settlement near Kherson, Ukraine (then Russian Empire), they settled in Nahalal, the newly established first moshav. Yehudit Simhonit's father, Moses Yivzori, was an ardent Zionist and a scholar well versed in the Bible and the Talmud. His house was the meeting place of intellectuals and youth members of the Jewish colonies sought to immigrate to Israel and work in agriculture. The Simhoni family came to Mandatory Palestine in 1921 becoming one of the founders of the moshav Nahalal, one of the state's first moshav shitufi. His mother, Yehudit Simhonit, was a Zionist activist and politician - a member of the first Knesset and a member of the Mapai party.

In 1931, at the age of nine, the Simhoni family moved to kibbutz Tel Yosef in the Jezreel Valley. He attended the common school for Ein Harod-Tel Yosef. In his teens, he stood out in his initiative and involvement in the community. He was well-versed with all areas of work in the kibbutz, particularly in agriculture and agricultural equipment. His also spent his time involved in sport as well as playing the trumpet in the brass band of the kibbutz.

Simhoni divorced his wife Delilah Aisrzon in 1952. They had three sons. His middle son, Avner Simhoni (Hebrew: אבנר שמחוני), was killed in 1968 when a land mine exploded in the Gulf of Suez during the military operations in the War of Attrition.

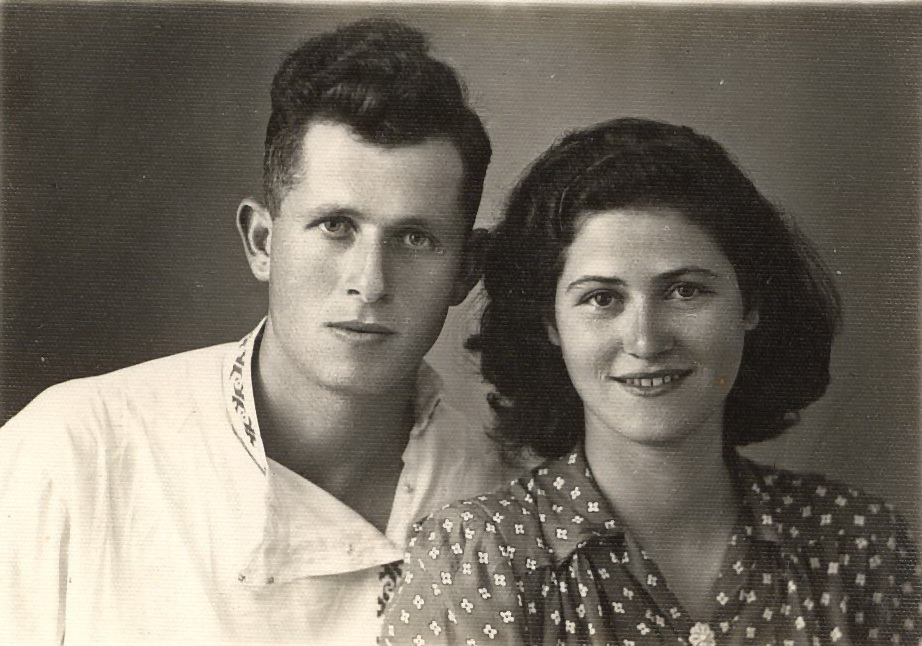
Asaf and Delilah Simhoni in Tel Yosef, 1944

== Military career ==
=== Haganah and Palmach ===
During the Arab revolt, at the age of 16, Simhoni led a student revolt against the school that refused to participate in the war effort. He believed in turning to the Haganah for protection. In 1938, Simhoni joined the Haganah and actively participated in protecting the region around the kibbutz from Arab attacks.

Simhoni became one of the first volunteers in the Palmach shortly after its establishment on May 15, 1941. Within two short months, Simhoni was involved in various operations in Syria in preparation for the upcoming Syria–Lebanon campaign by the Allies under the command of Yigal Allon, near the Old Customs House near Katzrin in the Golan Heights. The purpose of the operation was to cut off the telephone lines of the Vichy French Army, in an attempt to prevent their occupation of areas under Mandatory Palestine.

On June 8, 1943 he married Delilah Aisrzon. (Note: Delilah's father, Zeev Aisrzon, who was a key activist in the Histadrut and Mapai, later changed his name to Leon.)

During the first two years of his service in the Palmach, Simhoni served as a platoon commander. He also served as a guide as part of his unit in the Jezreel Valley, Upper Galilee, and the Negev. In 1944 he passed a platoon commanders course and was appointed commander of the Palmach's first settlement in Beit Keshet, a small kibbutz in the Lower Galilee near the Kadoorie Agricultural High School.

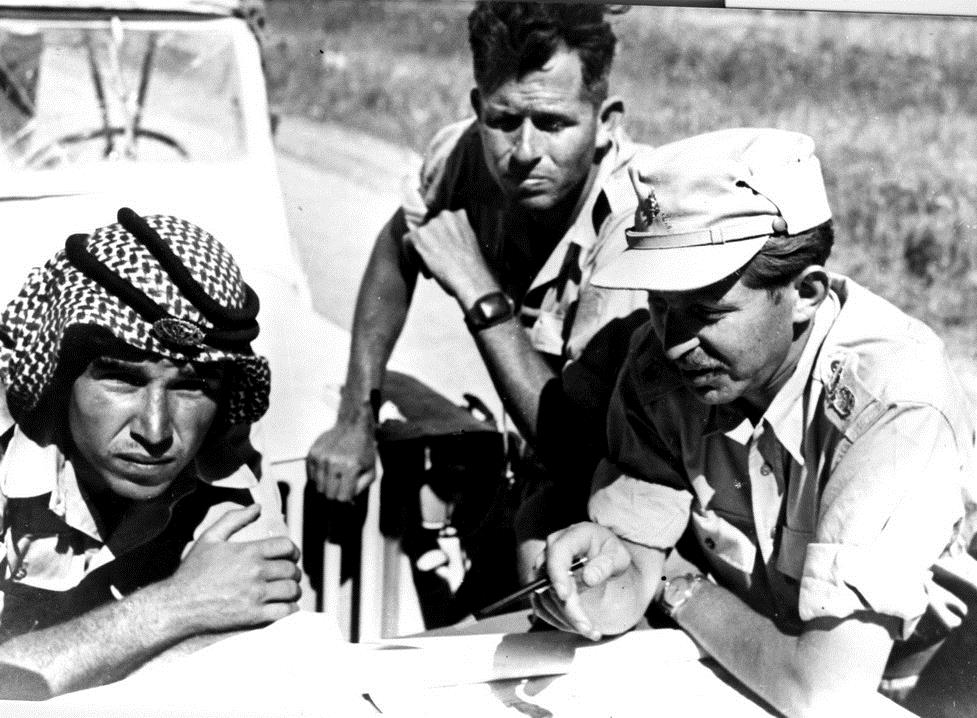
Asaf Simhoni with Chaim Herzog and a Jordanian officer, set the Armistice Line, 1948

In 1945 Simhoni was appointed commander of the Gadna (the Youth Battalions) in Haifa. There he struggled with the British which prevented the entry of illegal immigrants to Israel. He participated in a number of campaigns that aided illegal immigrants to get to the shores.

On Saturday, June 29, 1946 ("Black Sabbath"), Simhoni was arrested by the British. He was arrested in Rafah and was detained for five months, being one of the last ones to be released. Following his release Simhoni returned to the kibbutz. He worked there until the outbreak of the 1947–1949 Palestine war.

In November 1947, Simhoni returned to service for the Palmach. He was appointed deputy company commander of the first battalion of the Yiftach Brigade. Two months later he was appointed company commander. In the first months of the war Simhoni fought with the regiment against Arab gangs in Haifa, the Western Galilee, Gilboa and Bet She'an Valley. They also fought in the Battle of Mishmar HaEmek against the Arab Liberation Army of al-Qawuqji. A battle that begun with an attack against Mishmar HaEmek with the intent of taking the kibbutz which was strategically situated beside the main road between Jenin and Haifa.

In May 1948, Simhoni was appointed commander of company B (the "religious company"), a company composed of religious and secular recruits. After the end of a short amount of training, he commanded a platoon in Operation Matateh - an offensive attack with the objective of capturing flatlands between Lake Tiberias and Lake Hula in order to open a route Tiberias-Rosh Pinna. At the end of the month they fought against the Lebanese army in Operation Yiftach with the goal of capturing the eastern Galilee. For his service and involvement in these battles, he was praised by the commander of the Palmach, Yigal Allon.

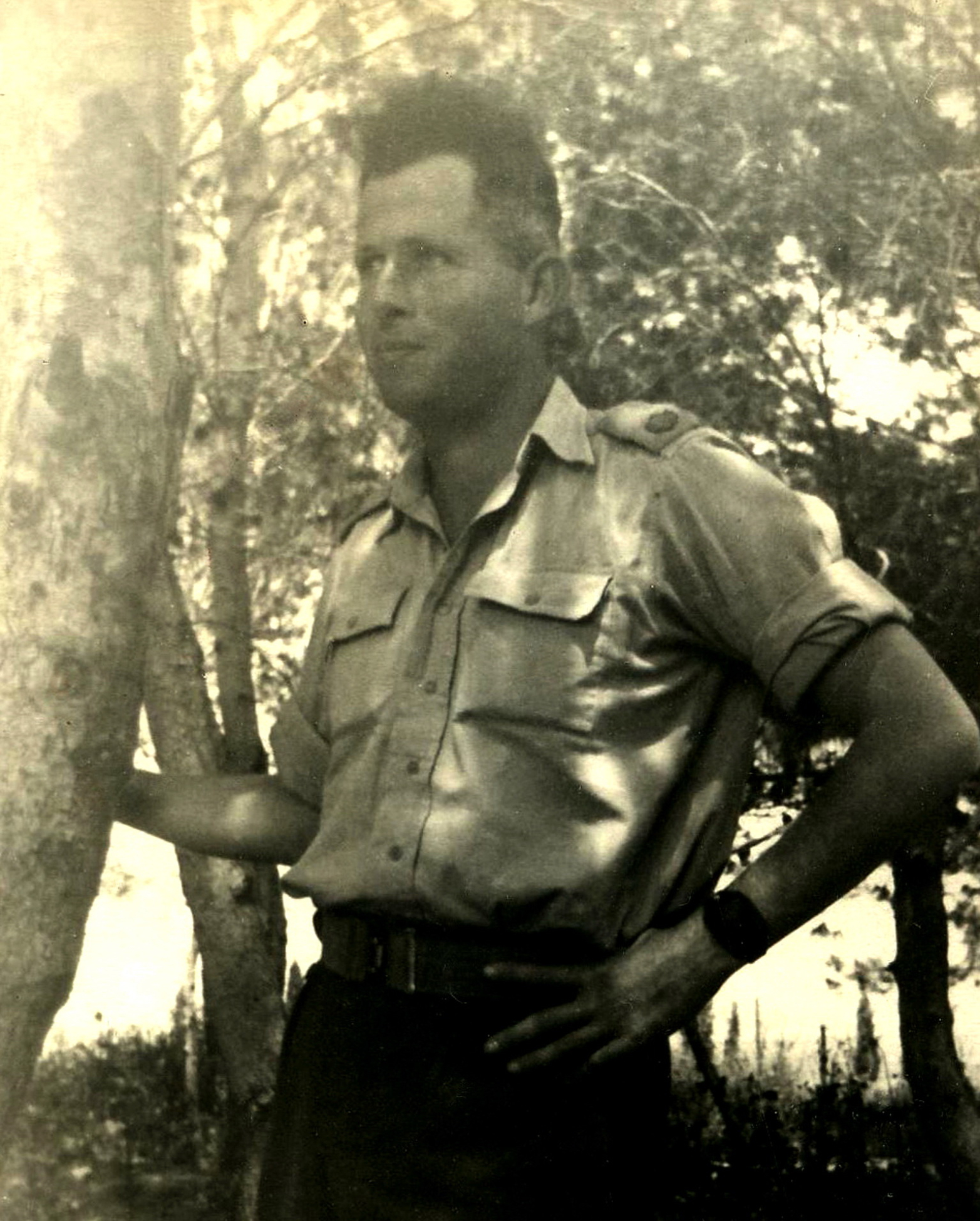
Asaf Simhoni, 1st Battalion Commander, Yiftach; 1948

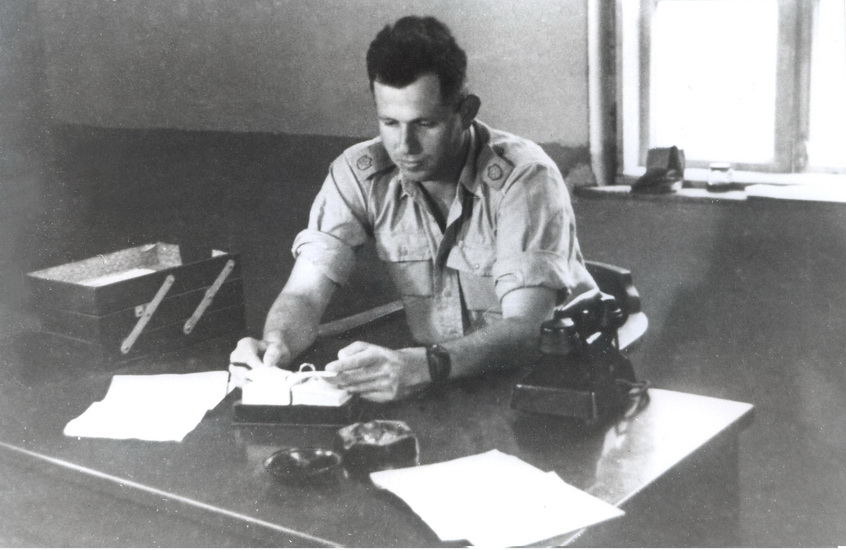
Asaf Simhoni as Commander of 1st Battalion, Yiftach Brigade, 1948

In June 1948, the Yiftach Brigade was moved to central Israel. As part of Operation Yoram, Simhoni's company recaptured kibbutz Gezer.

After a brief respite, Simhoni was appointed deputy commander of the battalion. In that capacity, he participated in the battles of the conquest of Lod and Ramla, and breaking the Jerusalem corridor during Operation Danny. There he also participated in Operation GYS, an attempt to create a corridor to the Israeli enclave in the northern Negev desert. In October he was appointed commander of the first battalion and commanded them in the Battle of Khirbet Mahaz near Kibbutz Beit Kama. They later fought in Operation Yoav with the goal of opening a route through the Negev to the outskirts of Gaza.

In total, Simhoni participated in the War in around 40 battles as a company commander, deputy commander and a battalion commander. Following the war, Simhoni was one of the most combat-experienced officers in the military.

In early 1949, Simhoni was part of the political storm that took place in the early years of the state. The election rules at the time were much less restrictive. There were no rules that prohibited the candidacy of officers on active duty. In turn a number of officers, including Simhoni, ran for the Constituent Assembly which took place on January 25, 1949. Mapai was the only party to include four military men in high spots on its ticket. The two highest spots were: Moshe Dayan, in the 10th place followed by Simhoni in 12th place. Both were invited to the Constituent Assembly. Simhoni resigned immediately after the elections and did not attend.

=== Israel Defense Forces ===
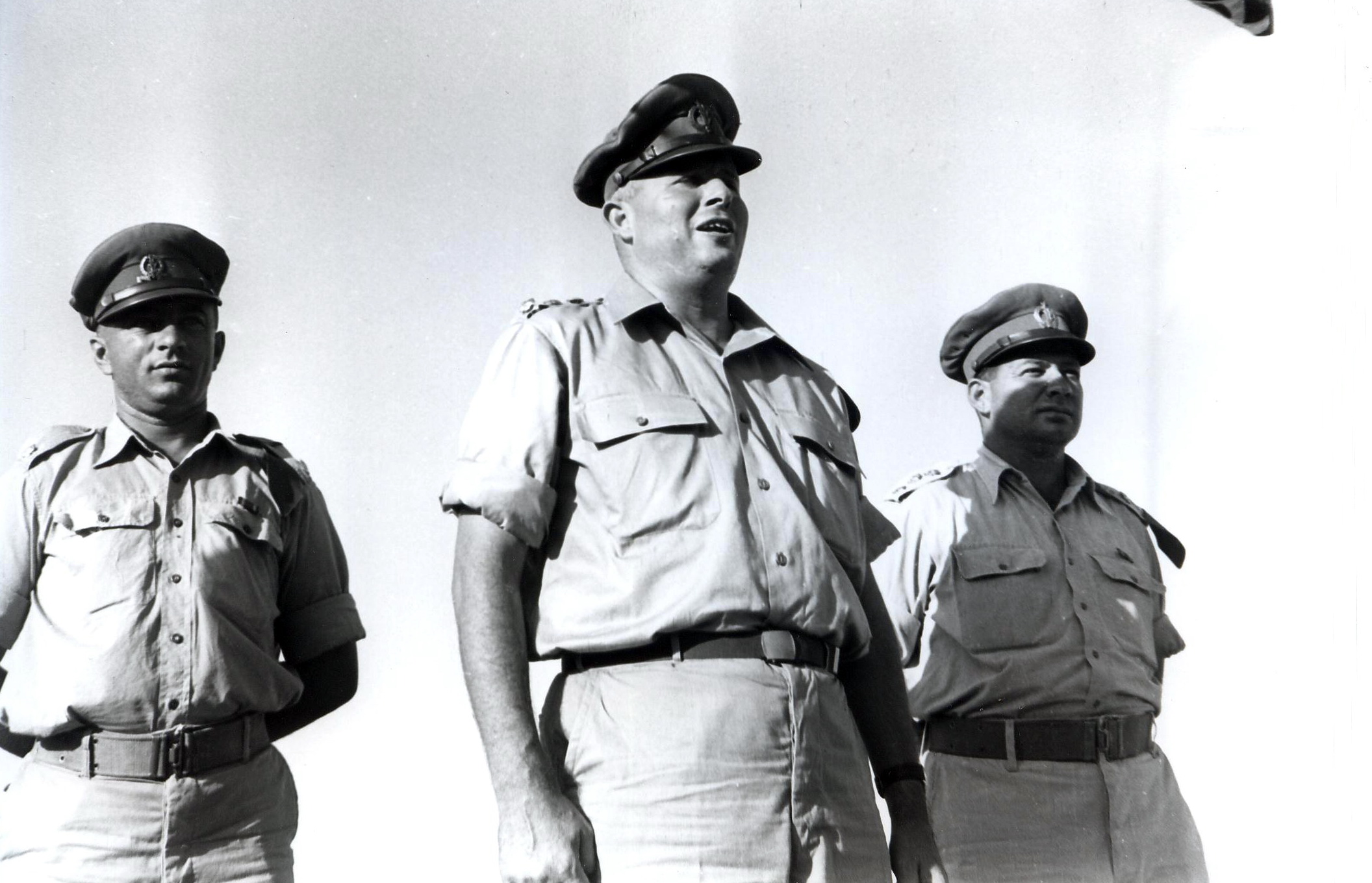
Simhoni (center), Northern Command, August 1953

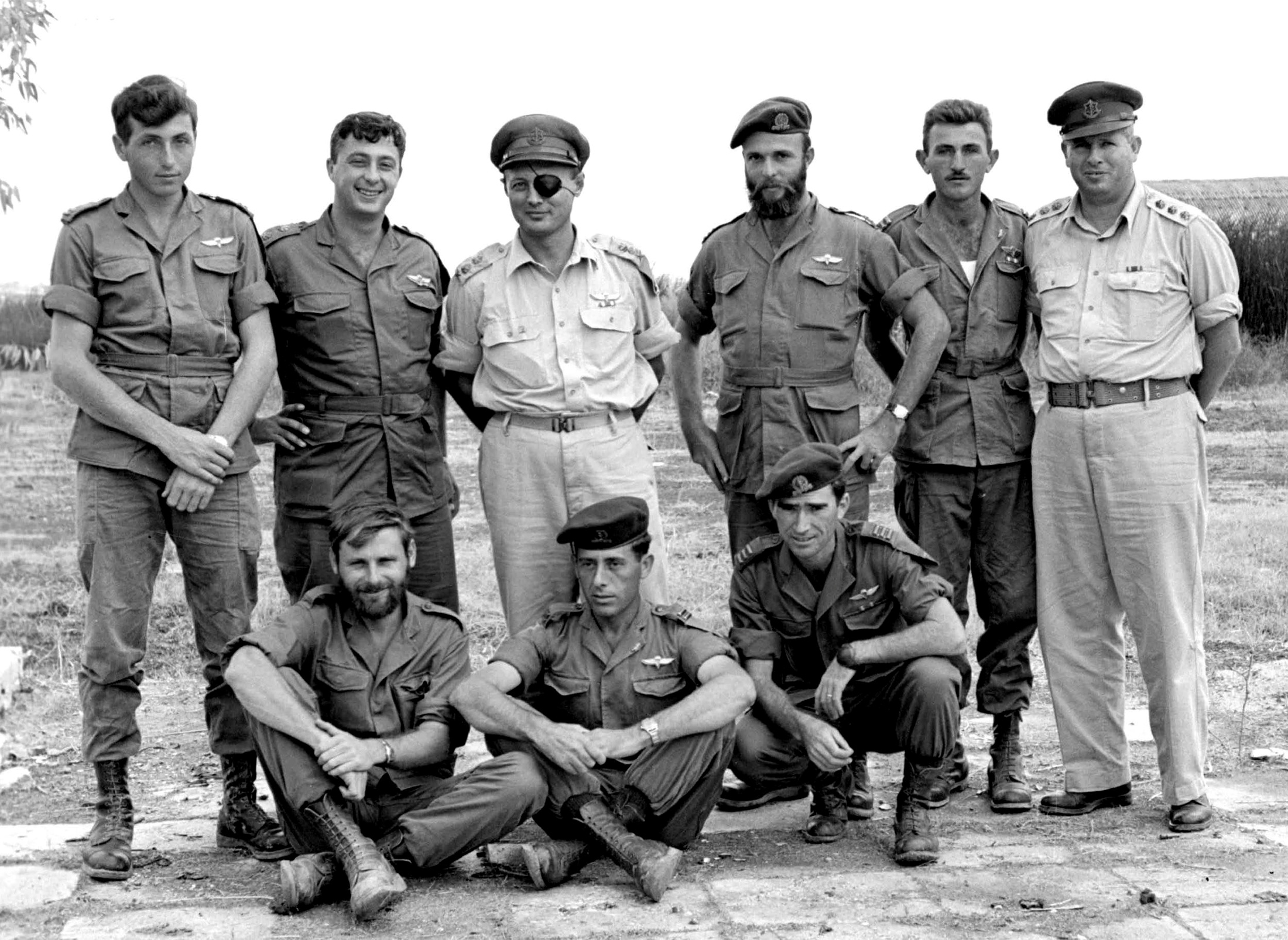
Members of Unit 101 after Operation Egged (November 1955). Standing l to r: Lt. Meir Har-Zion, Maj. Arik Sharon, Lt. Gen Moshe Dayan, Capt. Dani Matt, Lt. Moshe Efron, Col. Asaf Simhoni; on ground, l to r: Capt. Aharon Davidi, Lt. Ya'akov Ya'akov, Capt. Raful Eitan

After the 1947–1949 Palestine war and after his resignation from the Constituent Assembly, Simhoni was enlisted in the regular army. In April 1949, toward the end of the war, he was appointed commander of the Yiftach Brigade with the rank of lieutenant colonel. The brigade was turned into the 11th Division of the IDF.

In there, he held a number of senior positions while being on a relatively speedy promotion track. He became the Deputy Commander of the regimental school under the command of Yitzhak Rabin, later the brigade commander of the 17th Division and then Commander of the Golani Brigade.

From 1952 to 1954 Simhoni was the deputy head of Northern Command. Following the end of his post, Simhoni was transferred to the General Staff where he served as the assistant chief of the Operations Directorate. In that capacity, Simhoni handled the organization and planning of the reprisal operations that were conducted by Unit 101 and the Paratroopers Brigade under the command of Ariel Sharon. There he also dealt with organizing and training the Armored Corps shortly after its formation.

In February 1956 Simhoni was sent to a senior officer training course in England where he excelled in his studied. He intended, after his graduation, to be appointed commander of the Armored Corps. However, due to the worsening security situation in Israel and the preparation for war that took place on the southern front, Simhoni was urgently summoned back to Israel where he was appointed Head of Southern Command in August 1956 with the rank of brigadier.

In this capacity Simhoni participated in the Sinai campaign in an attempt to eradicate the Egyptian army in the Sinai Peninsula, aid with the opening of the Straits of Tiran to Israeli ships the cessation of terrorism in southern Israel.

==== Sinai War ====
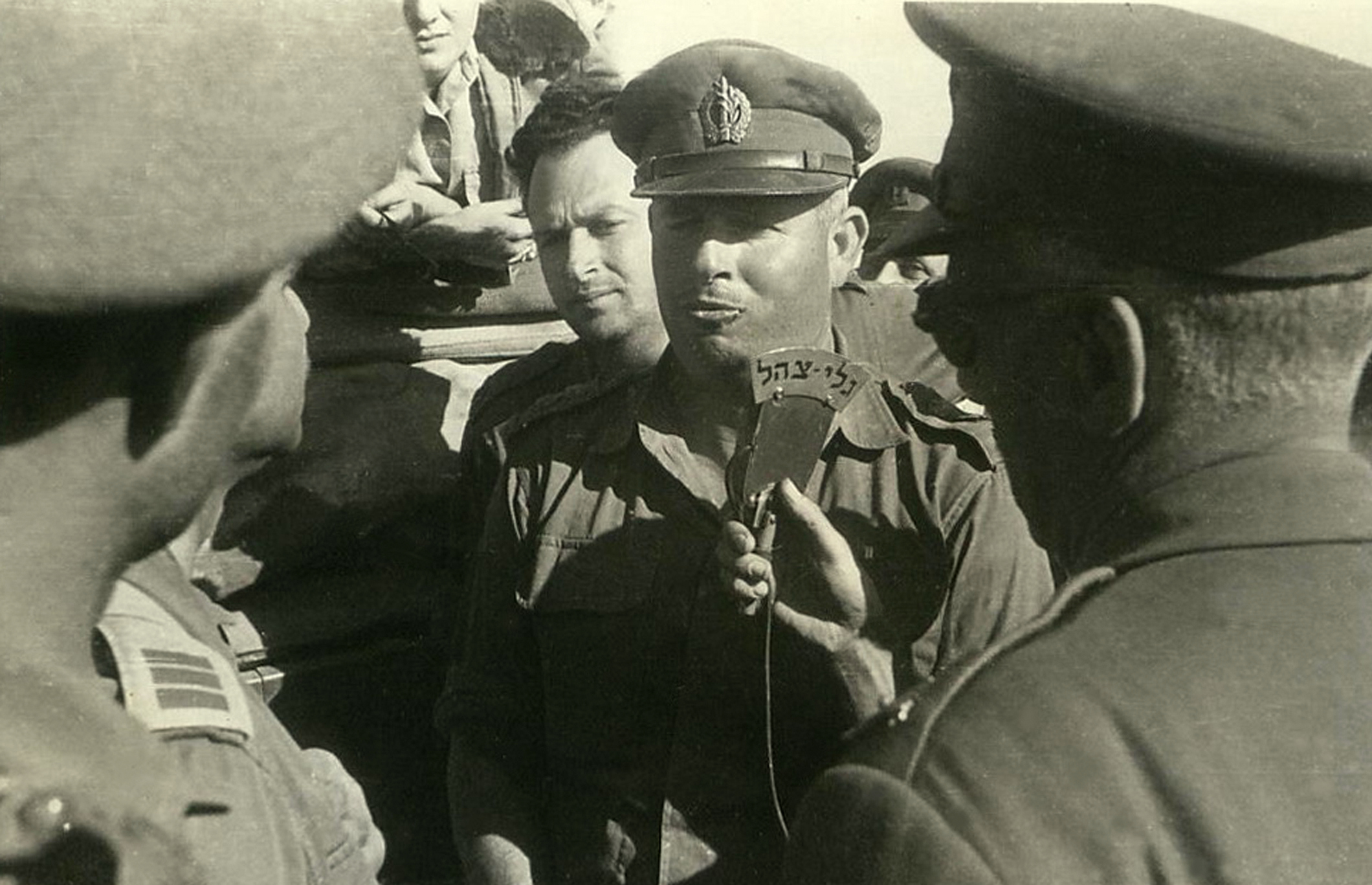
Asaf Simhoni being interviewed by IDF Radio after the Sinai War, 1956

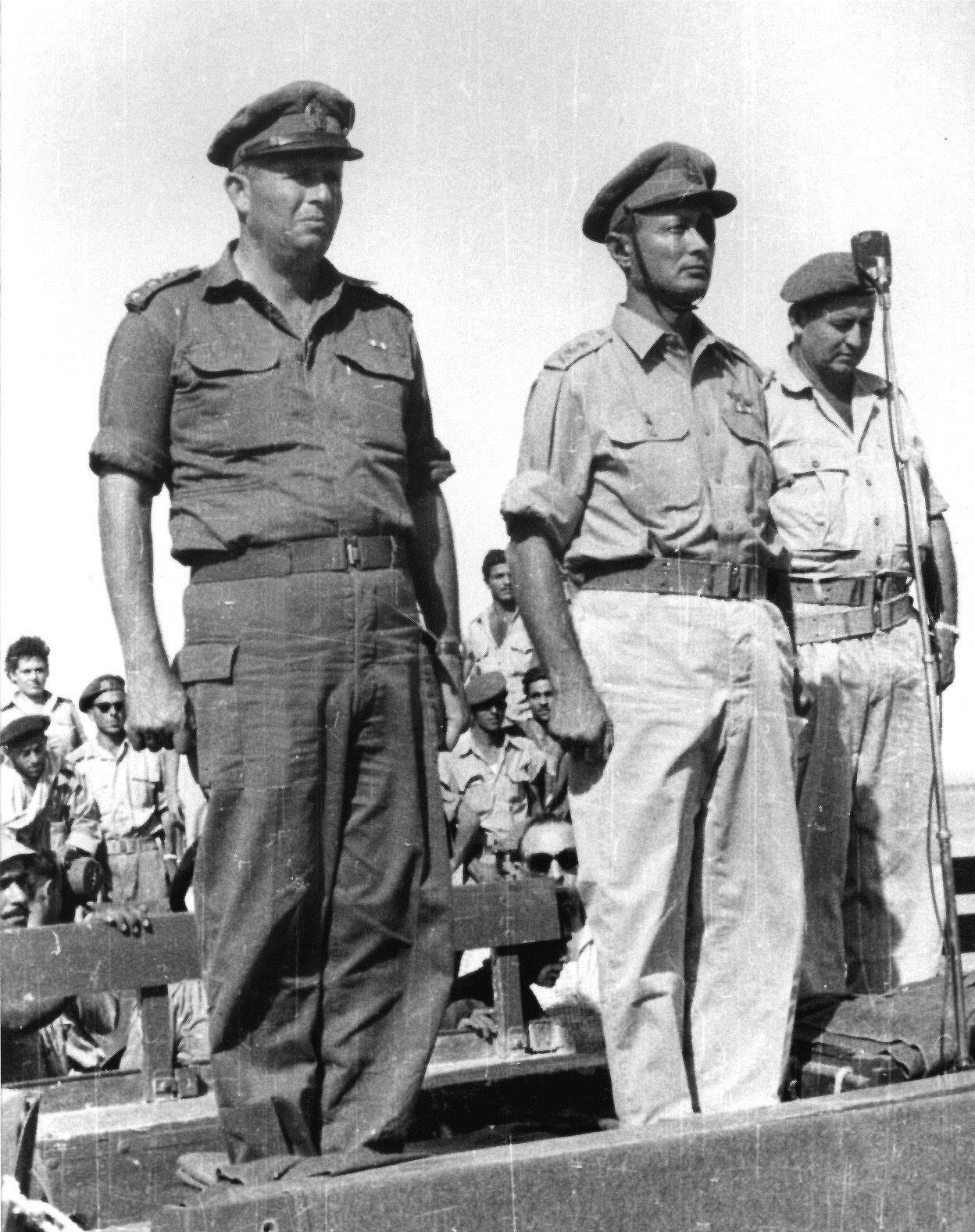
Simhoni and Moshe Dayan on a makeshift stage from vehicles, victory parade in Sharm el-Sheikh; on the right brigade commander Avraham Yoffe.

On October 29, 1956, with the start of the war, Simhoni selected to lead the attack on the central sector of Sinai Peninsula. This would in his opinion, an in retrospect rightly so, cut key and the main effort of the army of occupation of the entire peninsula. The following day he made the strategic move the sealed the fate of the operation: Initiate early move of the 7th Armored Brigade, concentrating the power to occupy the central system in Abu-Ageila, applying an indirect approach.

On November 2, Simhoni led his troops in the occupation of Gaza which ended with the surrender of the local governor and commander of the armed forces in the Gaza Strip. During these operations, which lasted eight days with minimal number of casualties, they were mainly successful in attaining their immediate military objectives: successfully capturing the Gaza Strip, Arish, the Hedgehog, and Mitla Pass, Sharm el-Sheikh was the last Israeli objective. On November 6, in Sharm el-Sheikh the chief of staff Moshe Dayan, Simhoni and brigade commander 9 division, and Avraham Yoffe, surveyed the conclusion of the war. During his command, in certain events, Simhoni led the restructuring of the IDF combat doctrine whereby the Armored Corps is the main decisive force in land. That move was directly contrary to the wishes of the Chief of General Staff Moshe Dayan. However, it was aligned with the opinion of David Ben-Gurion at the time. Additionally, following the lesson from the War in Sinai, the IDF combat doctrine has since been based entirely on the element of surprise, rapid movement and maneuvering, concentrated efforts, and quick operations. This doctrine led to further success it was applied to later wars.

== Death ==
On November 6, 1956, Upon completion of the victory parade in Sharm el-Sheikh, Simhoni took off in a small plane to El-Tor to visit other units. His plane took off from El-Tor at dusk toward Ramat David Airbase. His intention was to visit his family in Tel Yosef and Geva. However, because of severe weather conditions and poor visibility the plane veered off course and crashed in the grounds of the crusader fortress, Ajlun Castle, in Jordan (About 25 km southeast of Beit She'an). Asaf Simhoni, then a colonel, Head of Southern Command, and the pilot Benjamin Gordon (Hebrew: בנימין גורדון) died in the crash. According to some accounts, Simhoni had a meeting with Prime Minister David Ben-Gurion to prove to him, using secret documents, that contrary to the allegation of the chief of staff, he did not violate an order when he ordered Armored Brigade into Sinai.

== Legacy and commemoration ==
Simhoni was posthumously promoted (Note: Simhoni would have received an Aluf (Major General) rank had he not been killed due to his seniority as well as due to his successful service as Head of Southern Command in accordance with regulation.) to major general by the order of Defense Minister David Ben-Gurion, against the wishes of Chief of Staff Major General Moshe Dayan who had sharp conflicts with Simhoni. He was buried in the Mount Herzl National Military Cemetery.

President Zalman Shazar wrote the song "LaMnatzeach Misfad" (Hebrew: למנצח מִספד) in his memory.
