= Herzl Berger =

Israeli politician (1904–1962)

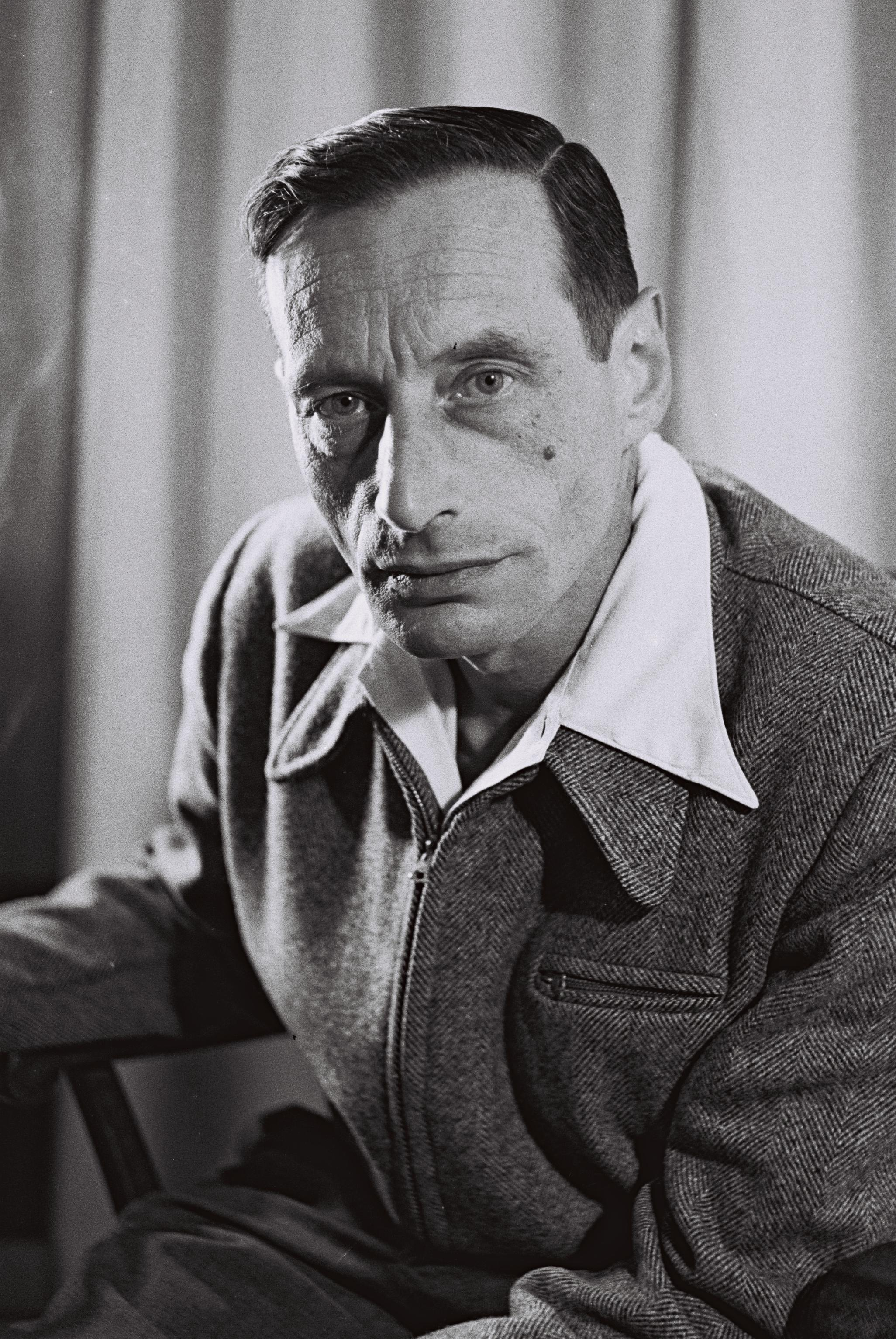
- Berger in 1951

Faction represented in the Knesset
- 1951–1962: Mapai

Personal details
- Born: 31 August 1904 Minsk, Russian Empire
- Died: 28 August 1962 (aged 57) Tel Aviv, Israel

Herzl Berger (Belarusian: Гэрцаль Бэргэр; Hebrew: הֵרְצְל בֶּרְגֶּר; 31 July 1904 – 28 August 1962) was a Minsk-born Israeli activist and politician. He served as a member of the Knesset for Mapai between 1951 and 1962.

== Biography ==
Born in Minsk in the Russian Empire (today in Belarus), Berger attended the Reali High School in his home city. Between 1917 and 1921 he was a member of the Zionist Hashomer Hatzair and HaHaver youth movements, which had been banned by the Soviet authorities. In 1921 he moved to Berlin, where he joined the Right section of Poale Zion, serving as secretary of its central committee between 1930 and 1931. He also studied at the University of Jena and gained a doctorate in law and political science.

In 1932 he moved to Poland and between 1933 and 1934 was a member of the Poale Zion Socialist Zionists' central committee. He also worked on the editorial board of the Das Vert newspaper. In 1934 he emigrated to Mandatory Palestine, where he worked for the Davar newspaper. He also joined the Haganah and was a political commentator for Kol Yisrael.

In the 1949 Constituent Assembly elections he was given a place on the Mapai list but was not high enough on the list to win a seat. However, he entered the Knesset on 5 February 1951 as a replacement for Yehudit Simhonit, who had resigned her seat. He retained his seat in the July 1951 elections, and was re-elected in 1955, 1959 and 1961. He died of cancer in 1962 whilst still a Knesset member at his home in Tel Aviv and was buried in Nahalat Yitzhak Cemetery. His Knesset seat was taken by Gideon Ben-Yisrael.
