= Simhon =

Simhon (Hebrew: שמחון) is a Hebrew surname. Notable people with the surname include:

- Avi Simhon (born 1959), Israeli economist
- Amit Simhon (born 1989), Israeli basketball player
- Shalom Simhon (born 1956), Israeli politician

== See also ==
- Miri Ben-Simhon
- Simhoni
