= Yehudit Simhonit =

Israeli politician (1902–1991)

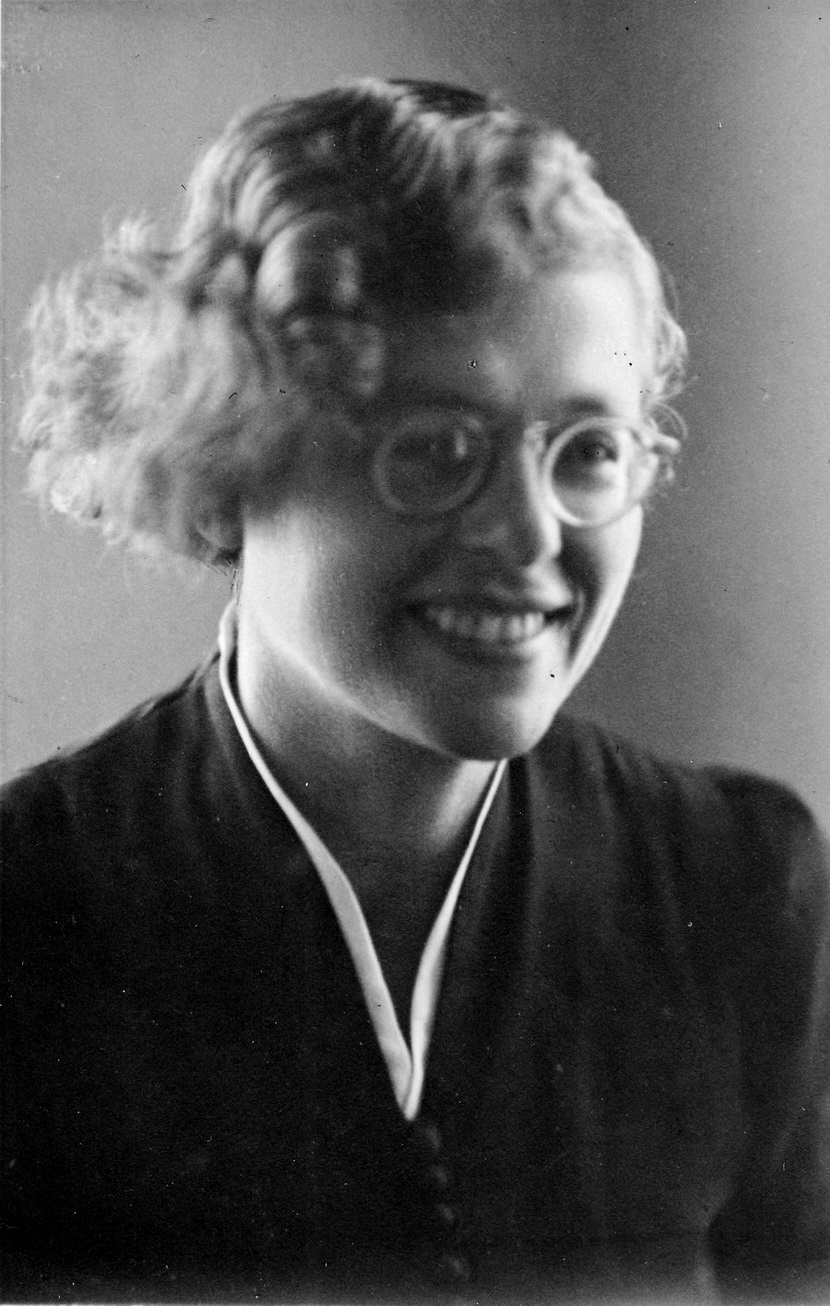
- Simhonit in 1941

Faction represented in the Knesset
- 1949–1951: Mapai

Personal details
- Born: 24 January 1902 Nahar-Tov, Russian Empire
- Died: 5 December 1991 (aged 89)

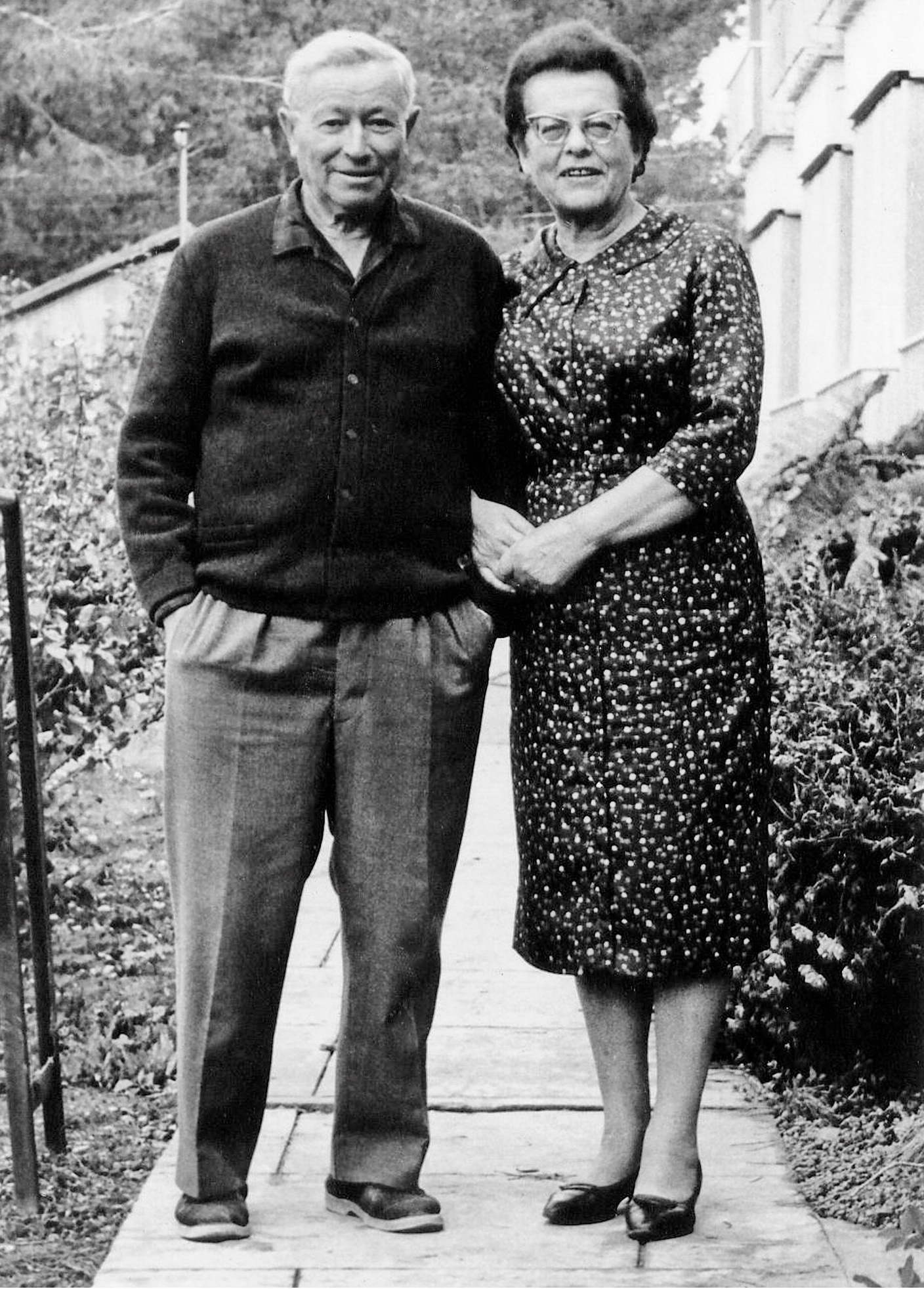
Simhonit (age 63) and her husband Mordechai Simhoni (age 70) in kibbutz Geva

Yehudit Simhonit (sometimes Simhoni; (Note: Her actual surname is "Simhoni"; however it was customary for Russian speakers to add a "t" (Hebrew: "ת") suffix to surnames of women) Hebrew: יהודית שמחונית; 24 January 1902 – 5 December 1991) was a Zionist activist and politician.

== Biography ==
Simhonit was born in Nahar-Tov, an agricultural settlement in the Kherson Oblast of the Russian Empire (today in Ukraine), and attended an agricultural high school. In 1917 she joined the Zionist Student Youth Federation.

In 1921 she and her husband Mordechai Simhoni emigrated to Mandatory Palestine, and settled in Nahalal, the newly established first moshav. In 1927 she became a member of the Union of Women Workers. She moved to kibbutz Tel Yosef in 1931, and moved again to Geva in 1943. A member of Mapai, she represented the party in the fourth Assembly of Representatives.

In 1949 she was elected to the first Knesset on the Mapai list. However, she resigned from the Knesset on 5 February 1951 and was replaced by Herzl Berger.

She later worked as a member of the Histadrut's co-ordinating committee and chief cultural and welfare officer of the IDF's Women's Corps. Between 1960 and 1965 she served as head of the Histadrut's International Relations Department.

In 1965 she left Mapai and was a founding member of David Ben-Gurion's new Rafi party, and was amongst its leadership until the party was dissolved in 1968. She died in 1991.

Her son Major General Asaf Simhoni was killed in a plane crash at the end of the Sinai War. Her grandson, Avner Simhoni, was killed in 1968 when a mine exploded in the Gulf of Suez during the military operations in the War of Attrition.
