= Gideon Ben-Yisrael =

Israeli politician (1923–2014)

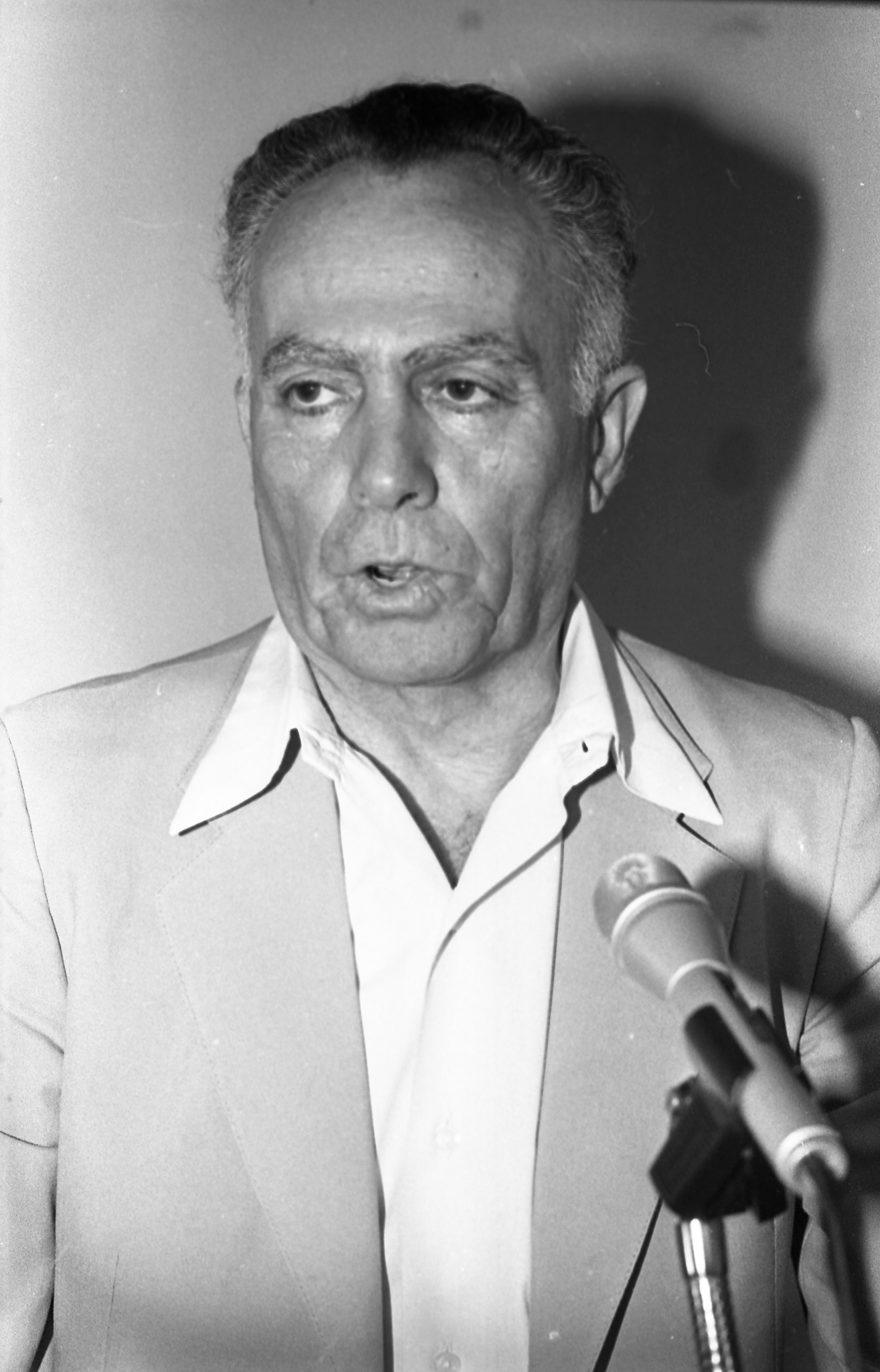
- Ben-Yisrael in 1984

Faction represented in the Knesset
- 1959–1961: Mapai
- 1962–1965: Mapai
- 1965: Rafi

Personal details
- Born: 6 March 1923 Haifa, Mandatory Palestine
- Died: 18 December 2014 (aged 91) Tel Aviv, Israel

Gideon Ben-Yisrael (Hebrew: גִּדְעוֹן בֶּן-יִשְׂרָאֵל; 6 March 1923 – 18 December 2014) was an Israeli politician who served as a member of the Knesset for Mapai and Rafi in the 1950s and 1960s.

== Biography ==
Born in Haifa during the Mandate era, Ben-Yisrael joined the Haganah, and between 1938 and 1940 was a recruiting officer in Jerusalem. During World War II he volunteered for the British Army and served in the Jewish Brigade. Following the war he helped to smuggle Holocaust survivors into Palestine. He then served in the Israel Defense Forces and fought in the 1948 Arab-Israeli War as a company commander in the Etzioni Brigade. He was wounded in the Battle for Jerusalem. Ben-Israel was demobilised from the IDF with the rank of Major.

After the war, he studied economics and international relations at the London School of Economics. He returned to Israel in 1953 and served as secretary of the Beersheba Workers Council, and was head of Labor Relations in the Ministry of Labour. He also lectured on labour relations at Tel Aviv University and the Hebrew University, and was a member of the co-ordinating committee of the Histadrut trade union, and chairman of its Organisation and Workers Council section.

In 1955 he married Ruth Ne'eman, sister of Yuval (later a government minister), who went on to become a law professor. They had two children, Marit and Sivion.

In 1959 he was elected to the Knesset on the Mapai list. The following year he received a graduate law degree from the Tel Aviv branch of the Hebrew University of Jerusalem. Although he lost his seat in the 1961 elections, he returned to the Knesset on 28 August 1962 as a replacement for the deceased Herzl Berger. He was amongst the Mapai members that broke away to form Rafi in 1965, and lost his seat in the elections later that year. He went on to serve as chair of the Labor Party's unions section, and was a member of the party's central committee and secretariat.

In 1996 he became chairman of the Pensioners' Union in the Histadrut, a position he held until his death in December 2014.

In 1999 Ben-Yisrael formed the Power for Pensioners party to advocate for the interests of pensioners. The party ran in the 1999 election, receiving 1.1% of the vote and failing to win a seat. Ben-Yisrael sought another term in the Knesset in the 2006 election, and was assigned the 26th slot on Labor's electoral list. He was not elected.

Ben-Yisrael died in Tel Aviv from natural causes. He was buried at the Trumpeldor Cemetery in Tel Aviv.
