= Kasla =

Kasla كسلا
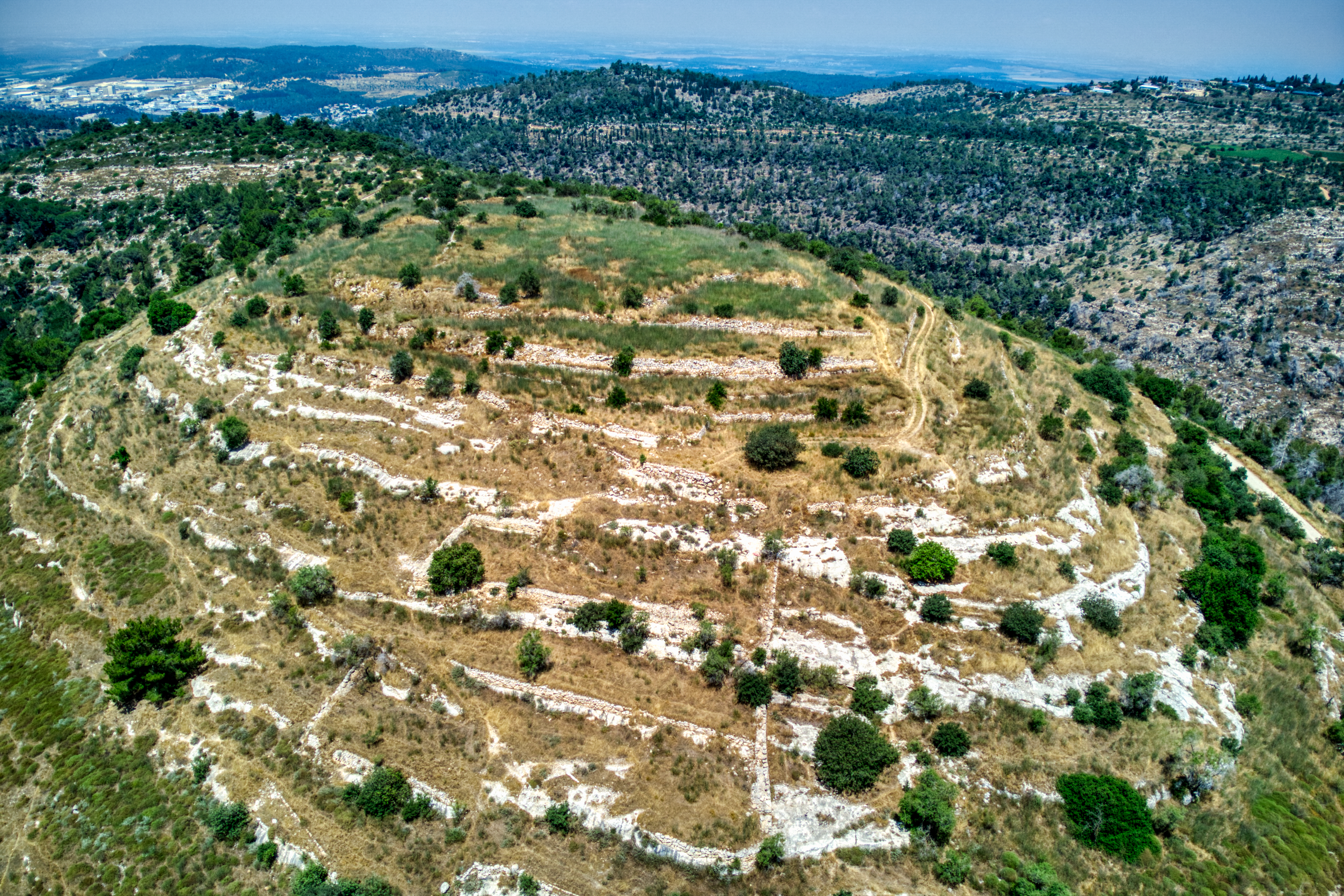
- Kasla was located on the top of the hill
- Etymology: from personal name
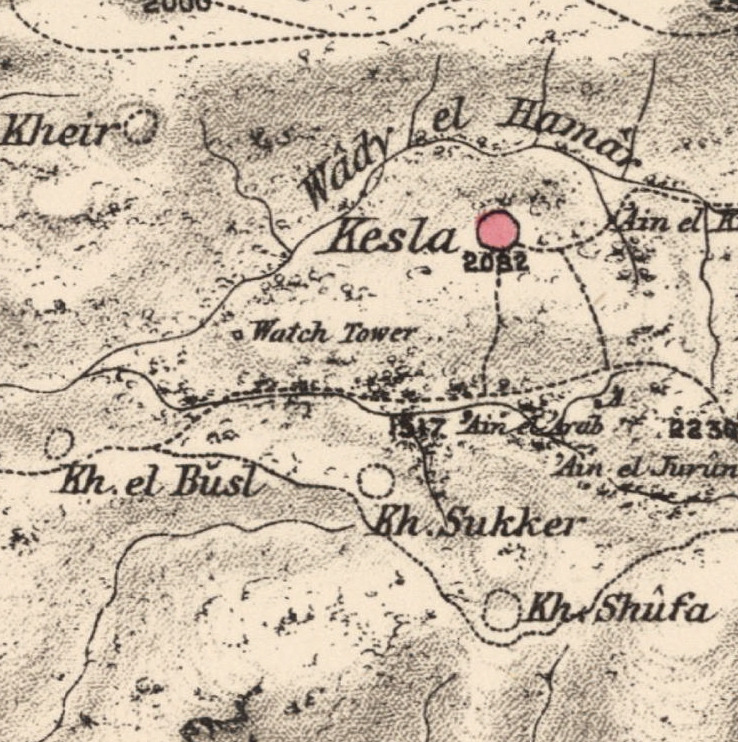
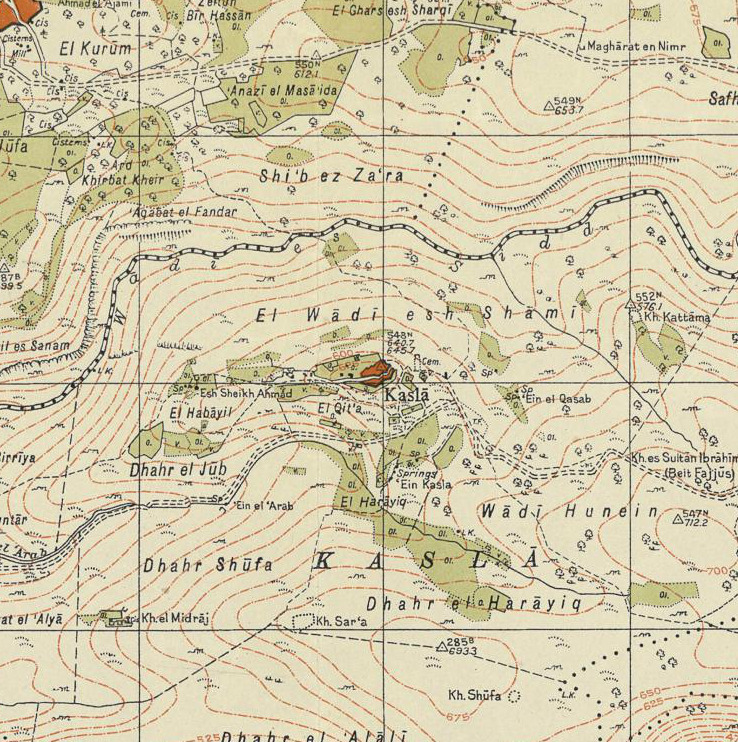
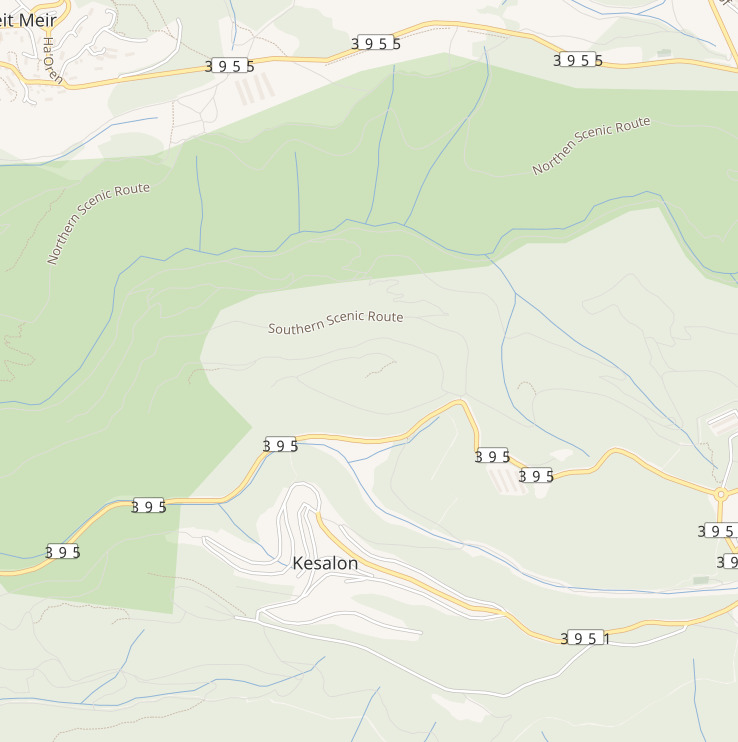
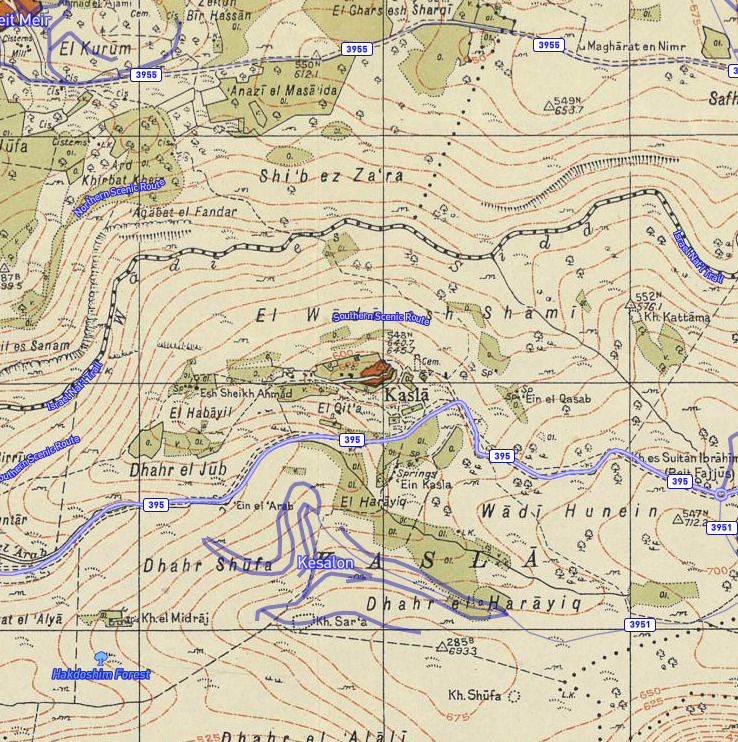
- 1870s map 1940s map modern map 1940s with modern overlay map A series of historical maps of the area around Kasla, Jerusalem (click the buttons)

- Location within Mandatory Palestine
- Coordinates: 31°46′52″N 35°03′04″E
- Palestine grid: 154/132
- Geopolitical entity: Mandatory Palestine
- Subdistrict: Jerusalem
- Date of depopulation: July 17–18, 1948

Area
  - Total: 8,004 dunams (8.004 km^{2}; 3.090 sq mi)

Population (1945)
  - Total: 280
- Cause(s) of depopulation: Military assault by Yishuv forces
- Current Localities: Ramat Raziel, Ksalon

Kasla (Arabic: کسلا) or Kesla was a Palestinian village in the Jerusalem Subdistrict. It was depopulated during the 1948 Arab–Israeli War on July 17, 1948, by the Harel Brigade of Operation Dani. It was located 17 km west of Jerusalem.

== History ==
=== Antiquity ===
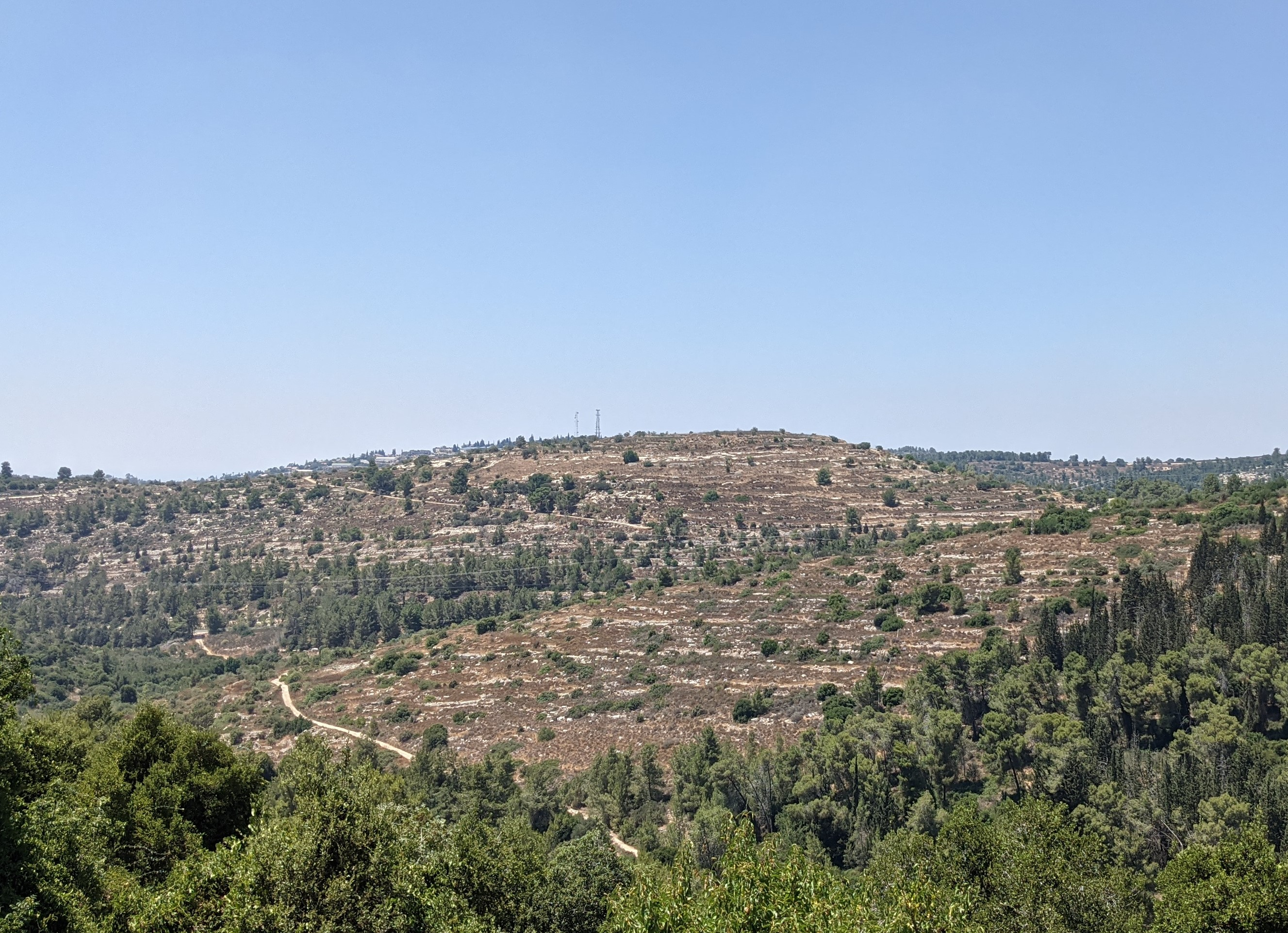
Tel Chesalon

Kasla has been identified with the ancient Canaanite settlement of Chesalon, and is believed to preserve its ancient name. Chesalon is mentioned in the Book of Joshua as one of the landmarks on the boundary of Tribe of Judah. During the Roman period, Chesalon was a Jewish settlement; it was mentioned in a document found in Wadi Murabba'at and dated to 55/6 CE. Remains from the Roman era has been found in a cave by the village. It is unknown whether it continued to exist in the aftermath of the First Jewish-Roman War and up to the Bar Kohkva Revolt.

Ancient ashlar stones have been found at Kasla, and the village had several khirbas, including a shrine for a local sage known as al-Shaykh Ahmad.

In the early 4th century Onomasticon, Eusebius described Chasalon as a large village in the territory of Aelia.

=== Ottoman era ===
Kasla was incorporated into the Ottoman Empire in 1517 with all of Palestine, and in 1596 it appeared in the tax registers under the name of Kisli, or Kisla, as being in the nahiya ("subdistrict") of Ramla, which was under the administration of Gaza Sanjak. It had a population of 11 household; an estimated 61 persons, who were all Muslims. They paid a fixed tax-rate of 25% on agricultural products, including wheat, barley, summer crops, fruit trees, sesame, goats and beehives, in addition to occasional revenues; a total of 1,280 akçe. All of the revenue went to a waqf.

In 1838, Kesla was noted as a Muslim village in the el-Arkub district, southwest of Jerusalem.

In 1863 Victor Guérin described it a being situated on a ridge, while an Ottoman village list of about 1870 showed Kesla with a population of 83, in 29 houses, though the population count included men only. It was also noted that to was located 3 1/2 to 4 hours west of Jerusalem.

In 1883, the PEF's Survey of Western Palestine described Kesla as "a small stone village in a conspicuous position on the top of a rugged ridge, with a deep valley to the north. There is a spring to the east, and two more in a valley to the south. This is the site of Chesalon."

In 1896 the population of Kesla was estimated to be about 207 persons.

By the beginning of the 20th century, residents from Kasla settled Bayt Jiz near al-Ramla, establishing it as a dependency – or satellite village – of their home village.

=== British Mandate era ===
In the 1922 census of Palestine conducted by the British Mandate authorities, Kasala had a population of 233 Muslims, increasing in the 1931 census to 299 Muslims, in 72 houses.

In the 1945 statistics, the village had a population of 280 Muslims, while the total land area was 8,004 dunams, according to an official land and population survey. Of this, 440 were used for plantations and irrigable land, 2,265 for cereals, while 10 dunams were classified as built-up areas.

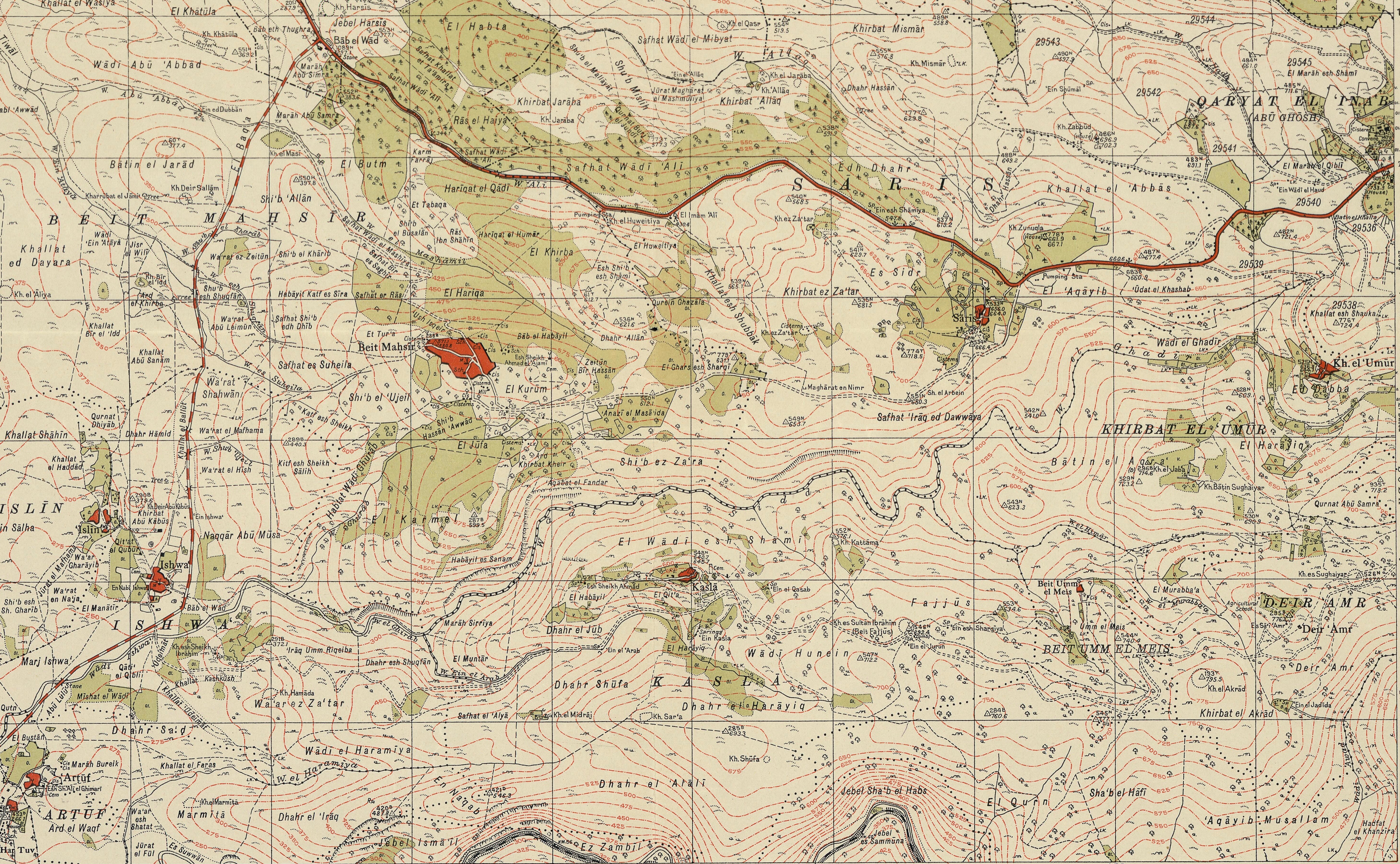
Kasla 1943 1:20,000 (below centre)

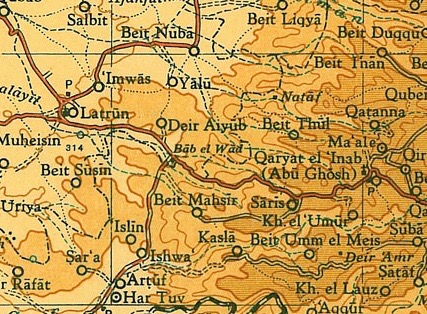
Kasla 1945 1:250,000

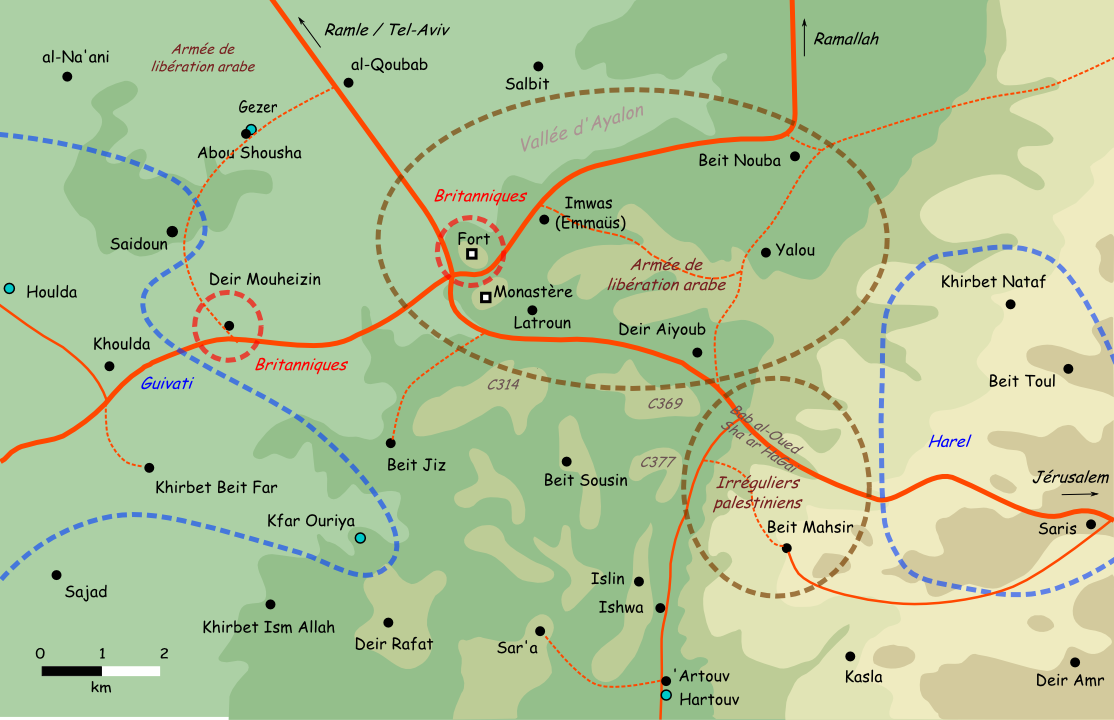
Kasla May 10, 1948 (lower right quadrant)

=== 1948, and aftermath ===
Kasla, along with four other villages, were overtaken by the Israeli Harel Brigade on 17–18 July 1948 in Operation Dani. The villages had been on the front line since April 1948 and most of the inhabitants of these villages had already left the area. Many of those who stayed fled when Israeli forces attacked and the few who remained at each village were expelled.

Israel established two moshavs on Kasla's land: in 1948, Ramat Raziel; while in 1952 Ksalon was founded 1 km south of the village site, on the archeological site named Khirbat Sa'ra.

In 1992 the village site was described: "Wild grass covers the entire site and grows amid the rubble of the stone houses, which is difficult to distinguish from the rubble of ruined terraces. Almond trees grow on top of the mountain and cactuses grow along the site’s southern slopes. Northeast of the village, two carob trees are surrounded by the remains of a vineyards. On the slopes, thick wild grass grows on several terraces, which are still intact."

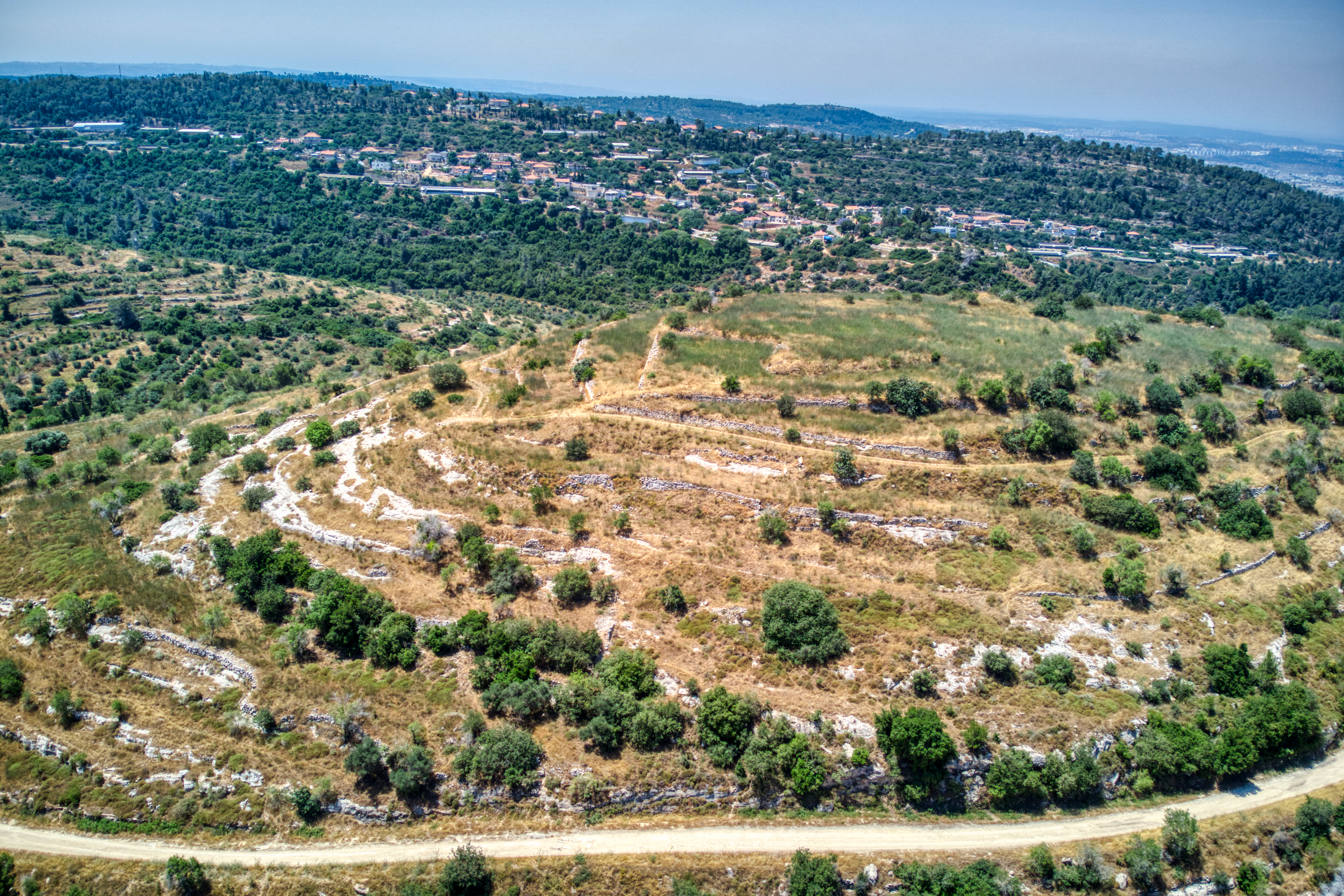
The hill on which Kasla was located and behind it, Ksalon which was built on its lands

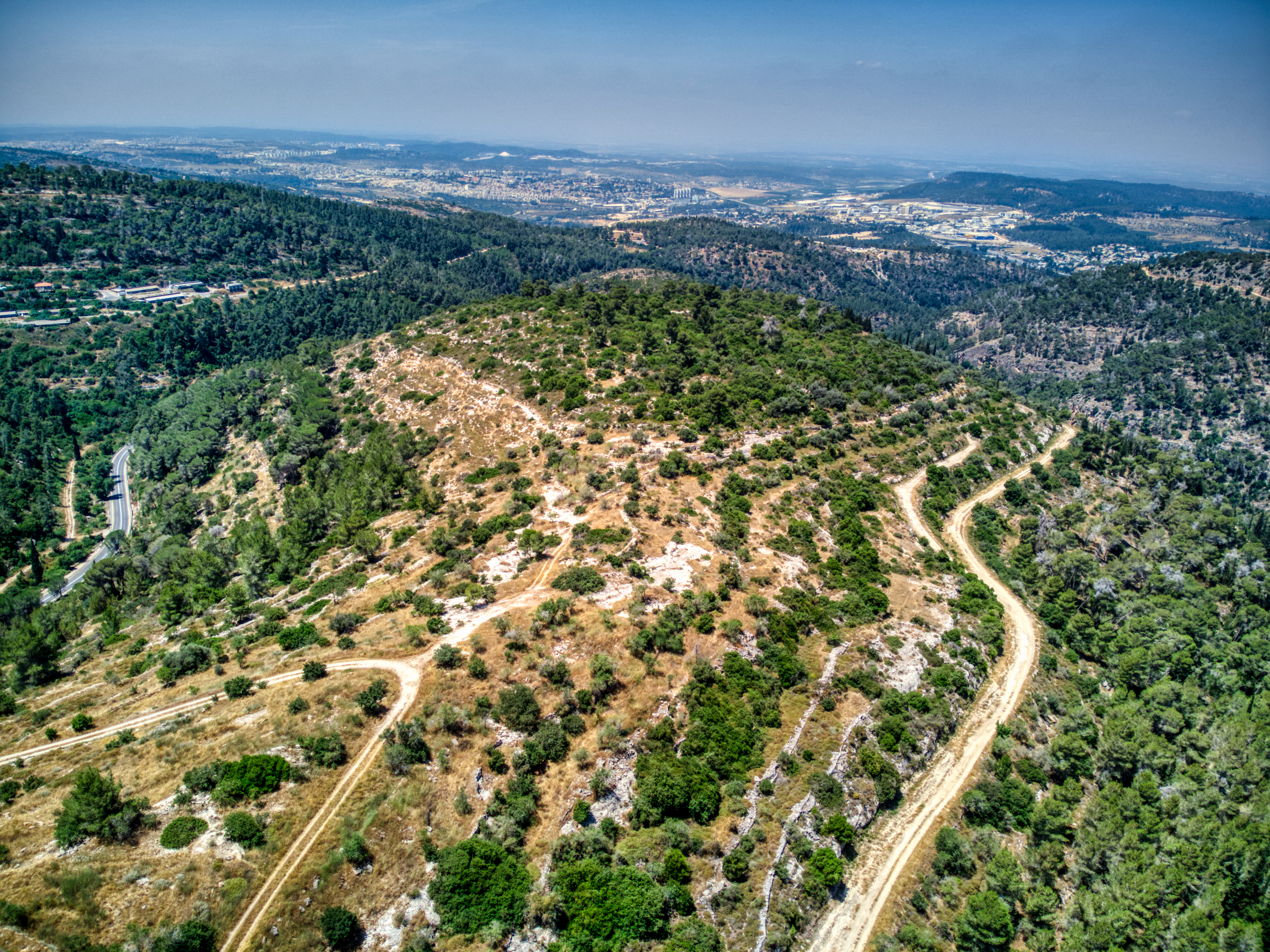
The saddle between the two hills of Kasla

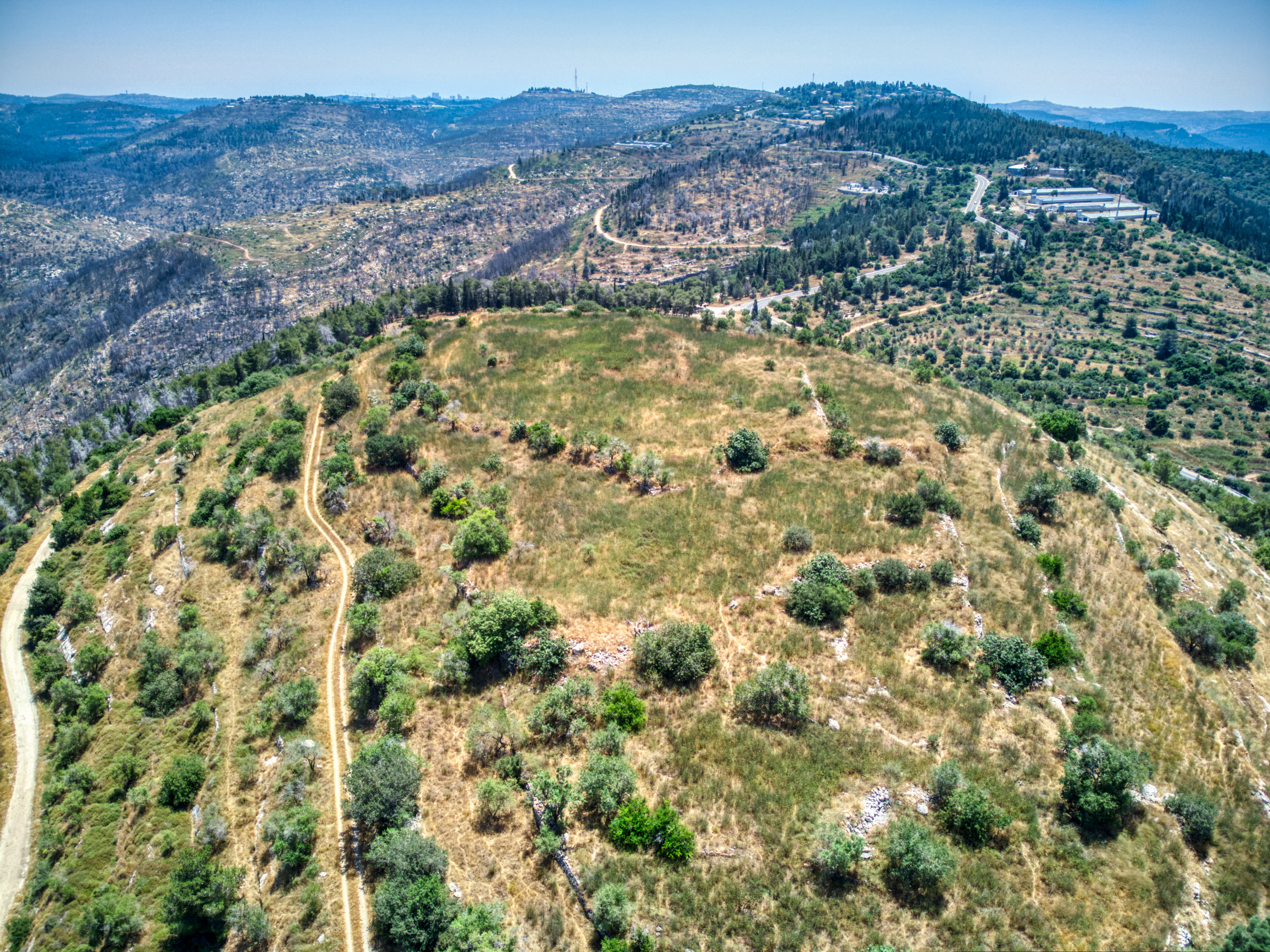
The location of the houses of Kasla

== Bibliography ==
- Albright, W. F. (October 1923). "Some Archaeological and Topographical Results of a Trip through Palestine". Bulletin of the American Schools of Oriental Research. 11 (11): 3–1. doi:10.2307/1354763. ISSN 0003-097X. JSTOR 1354763. S2CID 163409706.
- Barron, J.B., ed. (1923). Palestine: Report and General Abstracts of the Census of 1922. Government of Palestine.
- Conder, C.R.; Kitchener, H.H. (1883). The Survey of Western Palestine: Memoirs of the Topography, Orography, Hydrography, and Archaeology. Vol. 3. London: Committee of the Palestine Exploration Fund.
- Dauphin, C. (1998). La Palestine byzantine, Peuplement et Populations. BAR International Series 726 (in French). Vol. III : Catalogue. Oxford: Archeopress. ISBN 0-860549-05-4.
- Department of Statistics (1945). Village Statistics, April, 1945. Government of Palestine.
- Finkelstein, I.; Römer, T.; Nicolle, Christophe; Dunseth, Zachary C.; Kleiman, Assaf; Mas, Juliette; Porat, Naomi; Walzer, Naama (2021-01-02). "Excavations at Kiriath-jearim, 2019: Preliminary Report". Tel Aviv. 48 (1): 47–72. doi:10.1080/03344355.2021.1904680. ISSN 0334-4355. S2CID 235189602. "Chesalon (Kasla, G.R. 154132)"
- Ganor, Amir; Klein, Eitan (2015). "Khirbat el-Mitraz: Final Report". Hadashot Arkheologiyot: Excavations and Surveys in Israel. 127. ISSN 1565-043X.
- Guérin, V. (1869). Description Géographique Historique et Archéologique de la Palestine (in French). Vol. 1: Judee, pt. 2. Paris: L'Imprimerie Nationale.
- Hadawi, S. (1970). Village Statistics of 1945: A Classification of Land and Area ownership in Palestine. Palestine Liberation Organization Research Center.
- Hartmann, M. (1883). "Die Ortschaftenliste des Liwa Jerusalem in dem türkischen Staatskalender für Syrien auf das Jahr 1288 der Flucht (1871)". Zeitschrift des Deutschen Palästina-Vereins. 6: 102–149.
- Hütteroth, W.-D.; Abdulfattah, K. (1977). Historical Geography of Palestine, Transjordan and Southern Syria in the Late 16th Century. Erlanger Geographische Arbeiten, Sonderband 5. Erlangen, Germany: Vorstand der Fränkischen Geographischen Gesellschaft. ISBN 3-920405-41-2.
- Khalidi, W. (1992). All That Remains: The Palestinian Villages Occupied and Depopulated by Israel in 1948. Washington D.C.: Institute for Palestine Studies. ISBN 0-88728-224-5.
- Mills, E, ed. (1932). Census of Palestine 1931. Population of Villages, Towns and Administrative Areas. Jerusalem: Government of Palestine.
- Morris, B. (2004). The Birth of the Palestinian Refugee Problem Revisited. Cambridge University Press. ISBN 978-0-521-00967-6.
- Palmer, E.H. (1881). The Survey of Western Palestine: Arabic and English Name Lists Collected During the Survey by Lieutenants Conder and Kitchener, R. E. Transliterated and Explained by E.H. Palmer. Committee of the Palestine Exploration Fund.
- Robinson, E.; Smith, E. (1841). Biblical Researches in Palestine, Mount Sinai and Arabia Petraea: A Journal of Travels in the year 1838. Vol. 2. Boston: Crocker & Brewster.
- Robinson, E.; Smith, E. (1841). Biblical Researches in Palestine, Mount Sinai and Arabia Petraea: A Journal of Travels in the year 1838. Vol. 3. Boston: Crocker & Brewster.
- Schick, C. (1896). "Zur Einwohnerzahl des Bezirks Jerusalem". Zeitschrift des Deutschen Palästina-Vereins. 19: 120–127.
- Socin, A. (1879). "Alphabetisches Verzeichniss von Ortschaften des Paschalik Jerusalem". Zeitschrift des Deutschen Palästina-Vereins. 2: 135–163.
