= Ramat Raziel =

Ramat Raziel: רמת רזיאל (Hebrew)
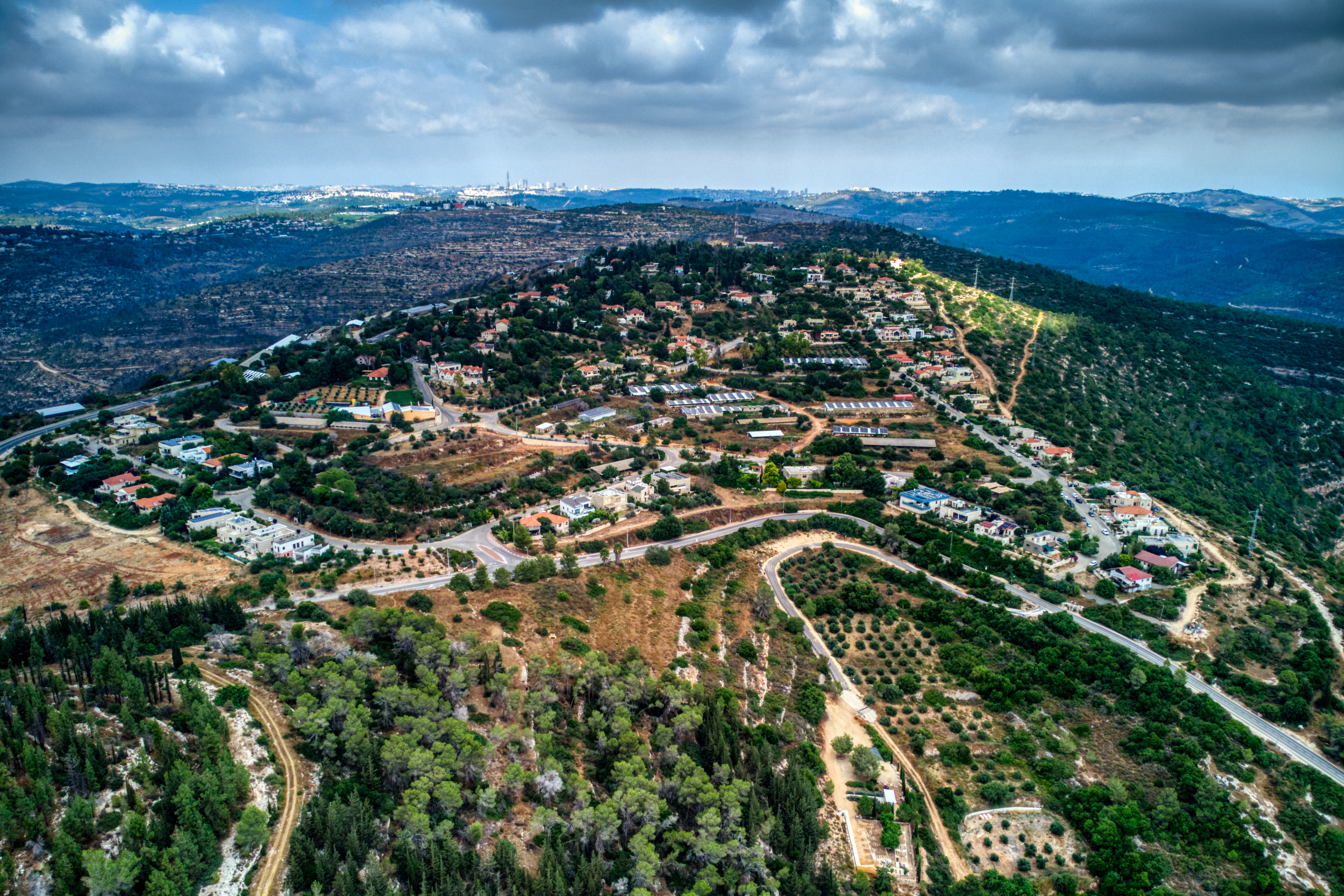

- Location within Jerusalem District
- Coordinates: 31°46′26″N 35°4′22″E
- Country: Israel
- District: Jerusalem
- Council: Mateh Yehuda
- Affiliation: Mishkei Herut Beitar
- Founded: 1948
- Population (2024): 684

Ramat Raziel (Hebrew: רָמַת רָזִיאֵל, lit. 'Raziel Heights') is a moshav in central Israel. Located in the centre of the Jerusalem corridor, it falls under the jurisdiction of Mateh Yehuda Regional Council. In 2024 it had a population of 684.

== History ==
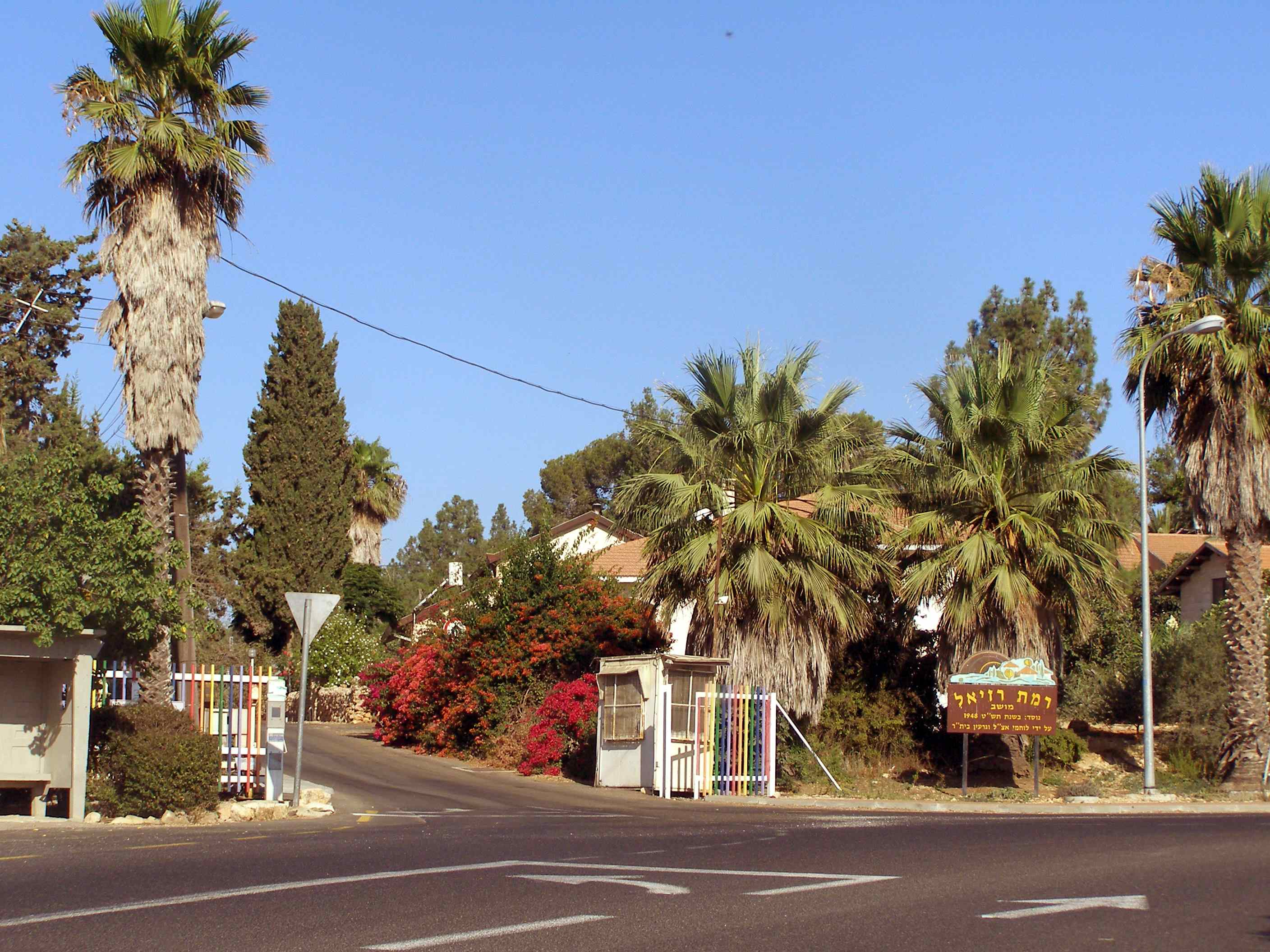
Entrance to Ramat Raziel

The village was established in 1948 on land that had previously belonged to the depopulated Palestinian village of Kasla before the 1948 Arab-Israeli War. It was named after David Raziel, chief commander of the Irgun.

Despite the difficult terrain, the economy was based on farming. In 1988 Eli Ben-Zaken planted vineyards and established Domaine du Castel, an award-winning winery, in Ramat Raziel.
