= Gevatron =

Israeli folk music group

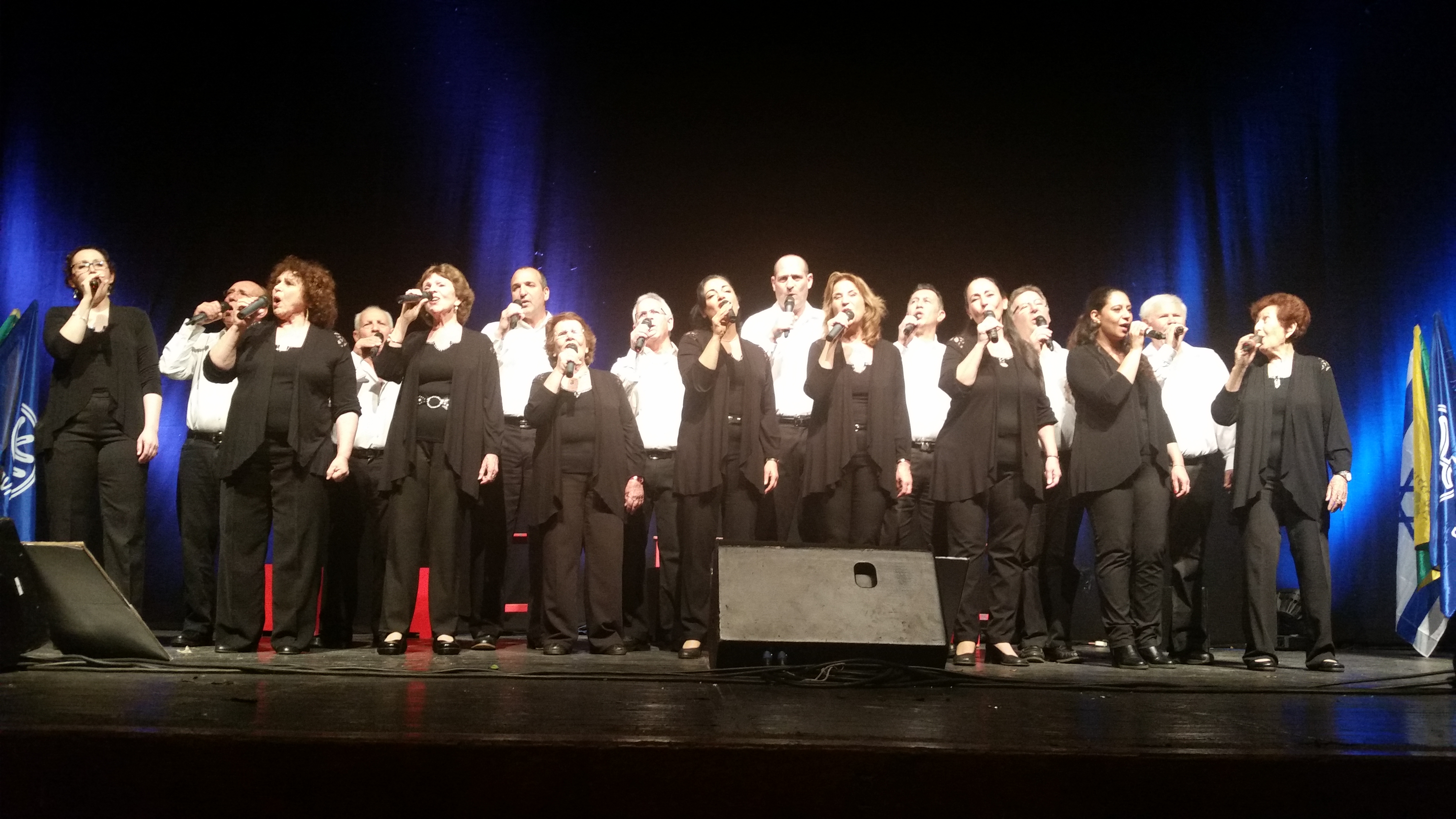
Gevatron in 2015

The Gevatron (Hebrew: הגבעטרון) is an Israeli Kibbutz folk singers group. The band started off in the early days of the state of Israel and are active to this very day. They are considered a unique phenomenon in the Israeli folk songs scene, and in 2007 won the Israel Prize for Lifetime Achievement.

== History ==
The band was founded in 1948 from the youth of Geva Kibbutz in the Jezreel Valley, in honor of the inauguration ceremony of the kibbutz basketball court, and to this very day it is still made up from Geva Kibbutz members and a number of members of the kibbutzim of Beit HaShita, Kfar HaHoresh, the communities of Moledet, Kfar Tavor and Timrat and the city of Afula, sing it voluntarily. The group members have their primary occupation outside the band, and the band is their secondary occupation. Members' age ranges between forty plus to seventy plus, and includes an electrician, teachers, a bakery owner, industrial workers, banquet hall manager, car mechanic and a nurse. Gevatron recorded many albums and held thousands of concerts in Israel and Jewish communities abroad, which won them success.

== Albums ==
- 1961 Le'an Noshevet Haruach
- 1961 Shibolei Paz
- 1965 Male Cos Yain Adom
- 1965 Zemer shel Tiul
- 1971 Emek Sheli
- 1975 Shirei Hanoar Haoved Vehalomed
- 1976 Zemer Im Hagevatron
- 1978 Shirim Mehof El Hof
- 1978 Gvanim, Silver & Golden Record
- 1980 Shirim Yafim, Silver & Golden Record
- 1983 Lecol Adam Yesh Shir
- 1985 El Haderech, Golden Record
- 1987 Mikol Halev, Golden Record
- 1988 Ahar Katzir-Neomi Shemer Songs
- 1988 Shirim Leorech Haderech
- 1991 Shnot Yaldut
- 1992 Hemdat Haemek, Nahum Heyman Songs
- 1993 Emek Sheli
- 1994 Yam Tichoni
- 1994 Yam Hashibolim
- 1998 Shuv Yotze Hazemer
- 1998 Hamishim Shnot Zemer '48-'98
- 2000 Osef Hagevatron
- 1990 Rahok Rahok
- 2003 Lashir Im Hagevatron, Show in Tzavta
- 2007 Shirei Reshit Haderech, with Nahche
- 2008 Giva Ahat, Gevatron is 60 years old
