= Ksalon =

Moshav in central Israel

Ksalon: כְּסָלוֹן (Hebrew)

Hebrew transcription(s)
  - Official: Kesalon
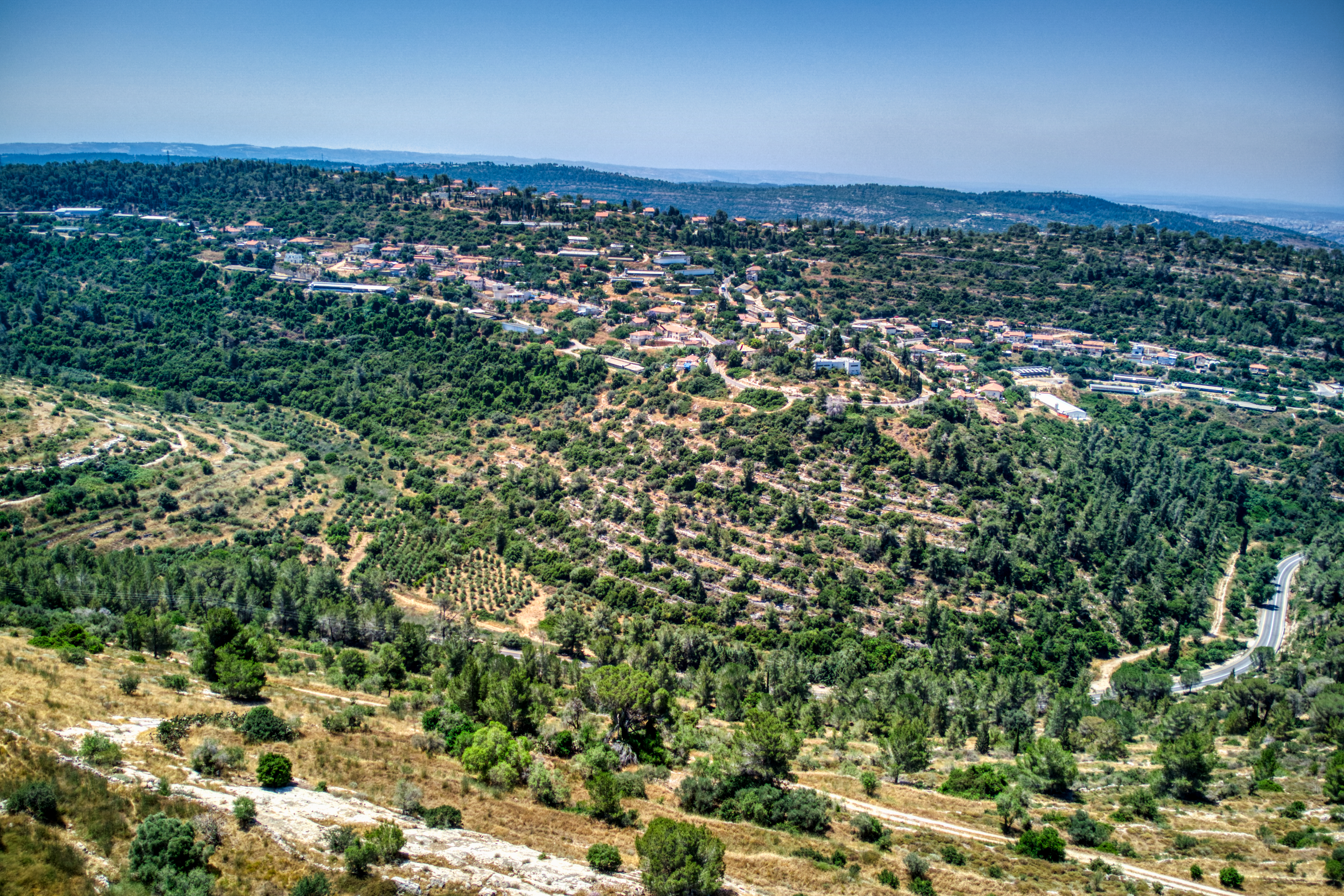

- Location within Jerusalem District
- Coordinates: 31°46′26″N 35°2′58″E
- Country: Israel
- District: Jerusalem
- Council: Mateh Yehuda
- Affiliation: Agricultural Union
- Founded: 1952
- Founder: Yemenite Jews
- Population (2024): 521

Ksalon or Kesalon (Hebrew: כְּסָלוֹן) is a moshav in central Israel. Located near Beit Shemesh, it falls under the jurisdiction of Mateh Yehuda Regional Council. In 2024 it had a population of 521.

== History ==
The first transit camp (ma'abara) for new Jewish immigrants was set up in 1950 on the lands of the depopulated Palestinian village of Kasla. New immigrants from Yemen brought to Israel in Operation Magic Carpet were given farmland there, but abandoned the moshav a few years later to join members of the Yemenite community living in Rosh Ha'ayin. Their place was taken by Jewish immigrants from Morocco.

The moshav was named for the biblical city of Kesalon (Chesalon) mentioned in Joshua 15:10, which was probably situated on the tel nearby and preserved in the Palestinian name of the place.
