= Jerusalem corridor =

Geographical district between Jerusalem and the Shfela in Israel

Coordinates: 31.7833°N 35.1000°E

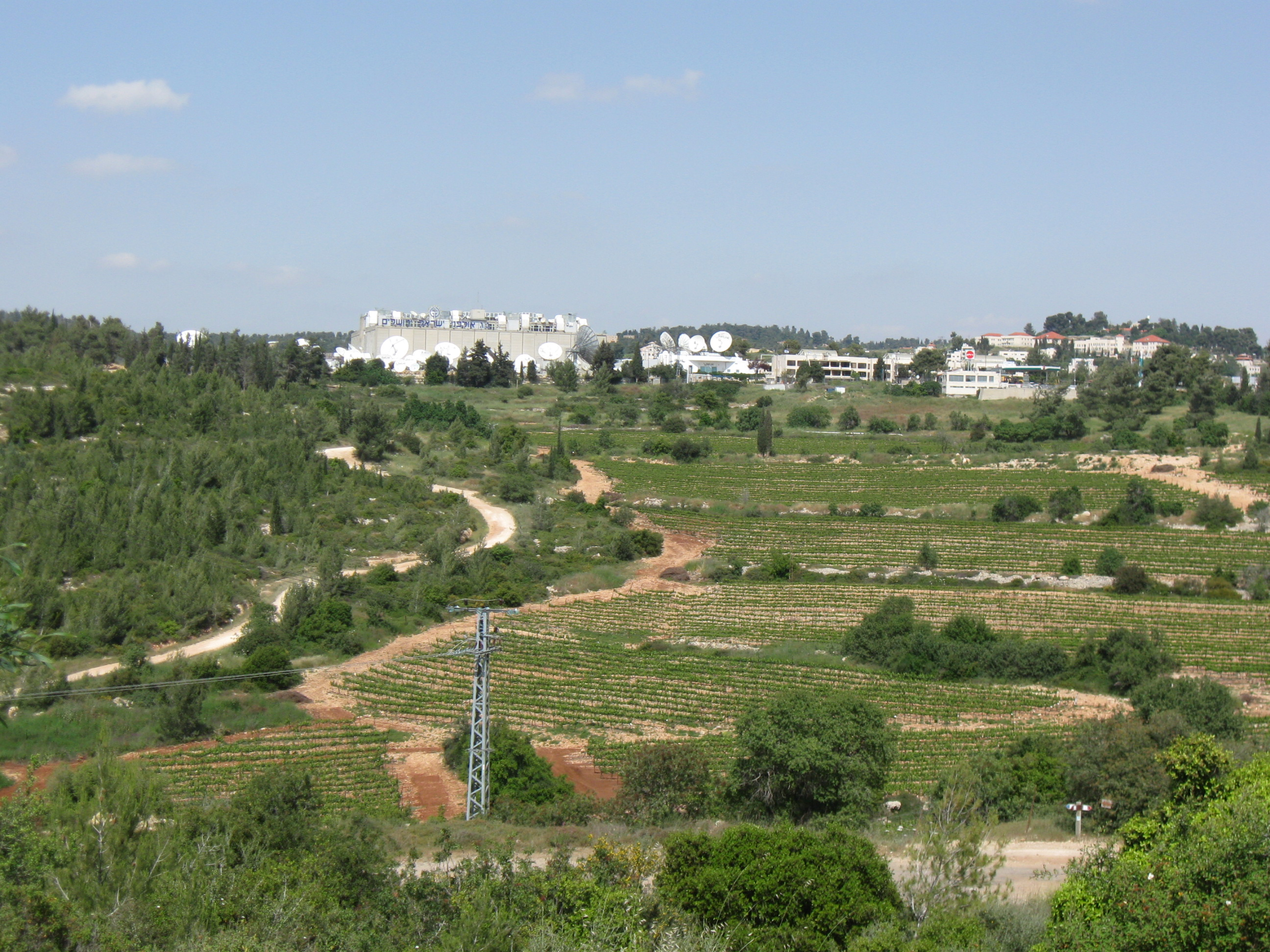
Neve Ilan television studios in the Jerusalem corridor

The Jerusalem corridor (Hebrew: פרוזדור ירושלים, Prozdor Yerushalayim) is an area between Jerusalem and the Shephelah in Israel. Its northern border is the old road to Jerusalem; its southern border, the Elah Valley; and its western border, Sha'ar HaGai/Bab el-Wad and the road to Beit Shemesh. The largest towns in the Jerusalem corridor are Beit Shemesh, Mevasseret Zion, Abu Ghosh, Tzur Hadassah and Kiryat Ye'arim

== History ==
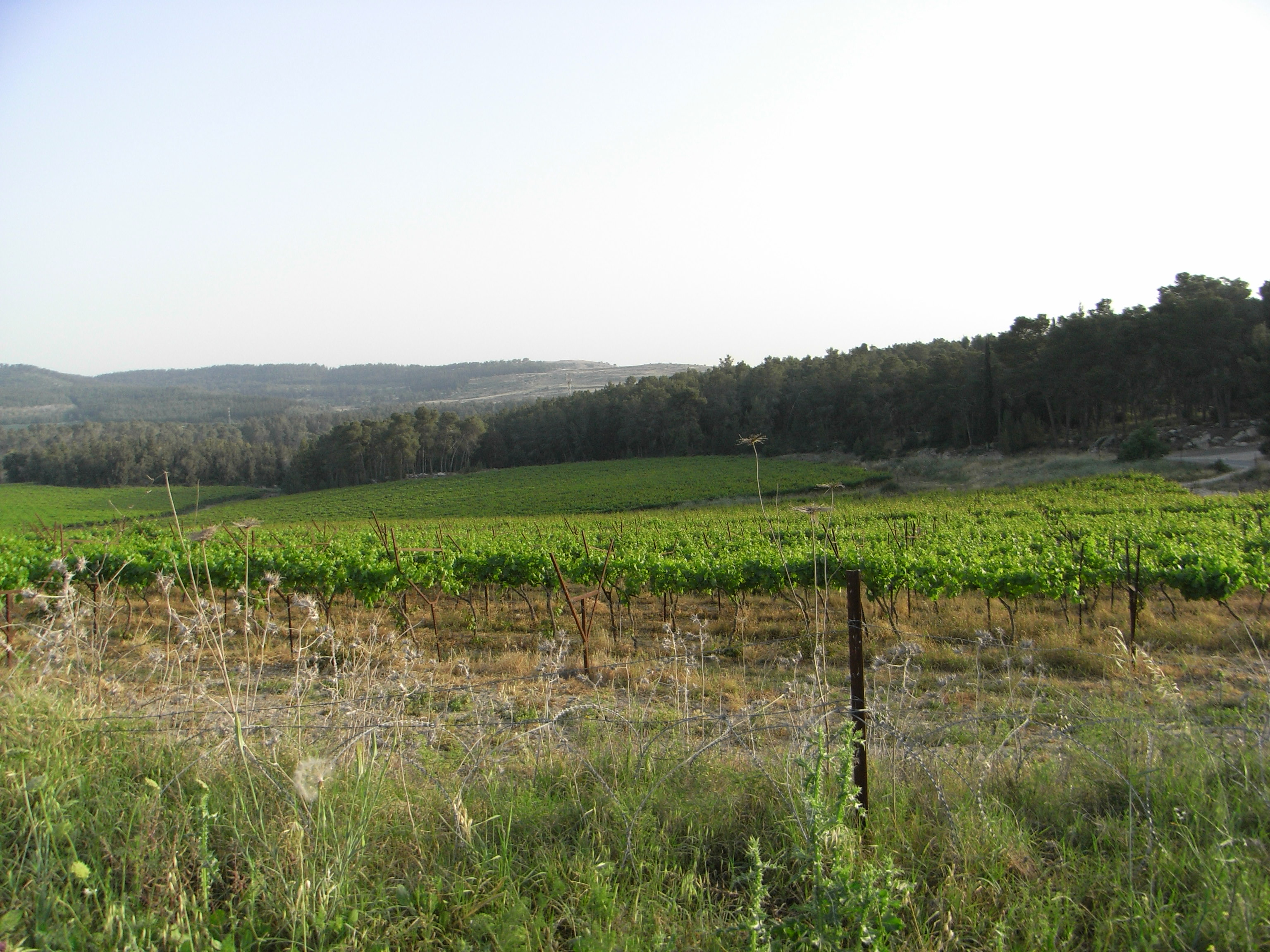
Vineyard in the Jerusalem corridor

Historically, terrace farming had been practiced on the hills and in the narrow valleys and wadis of the area through the laborious process of moving stones to construct retaining walls and then filling them in with arable soil watered only by the rain.

During the 1947-48 war, the Jerusalem corridor was the only route for bringing supplies to besieged Jerusalem. In the Battles of Latrun from May to July 1948, Jewish forces repeatedly attempted to capture the heavily fortified former British police Tegart fort at Latrun, where forces of the Jordanian Arab Legion were stationed following the facility's evacuation by the British in mid-May. Led by Mickey Marcus, the so-called Burma Road was constructed as a way to bypass Latrun, operating from late May until December 1948 as an alternative means of safely sending convoys providing vitally needed supplies on a rugged mountainous route that allowed Israeli troops to bypass the bottlenecks and ambushes that made the main road unpassable. In October 1948, Israeli troops brought the area under their control during Operation HaHar. The Arab inhabitants fled their villages during the war.

By 1949, the mountainous, rocky region of the corridor was bare of trees. In the first decade of the State of Israel, a total of 35 agricultural settlements were established in the Jerusalem corridor by new immigrants from Iraq, Yemen and Yugoslavia. The JNF employed many of the newcomers in afforestation and land reclamation at such projects as the Forest of the Martyrs. Since then it has become one of the largest afforested regions in the country.

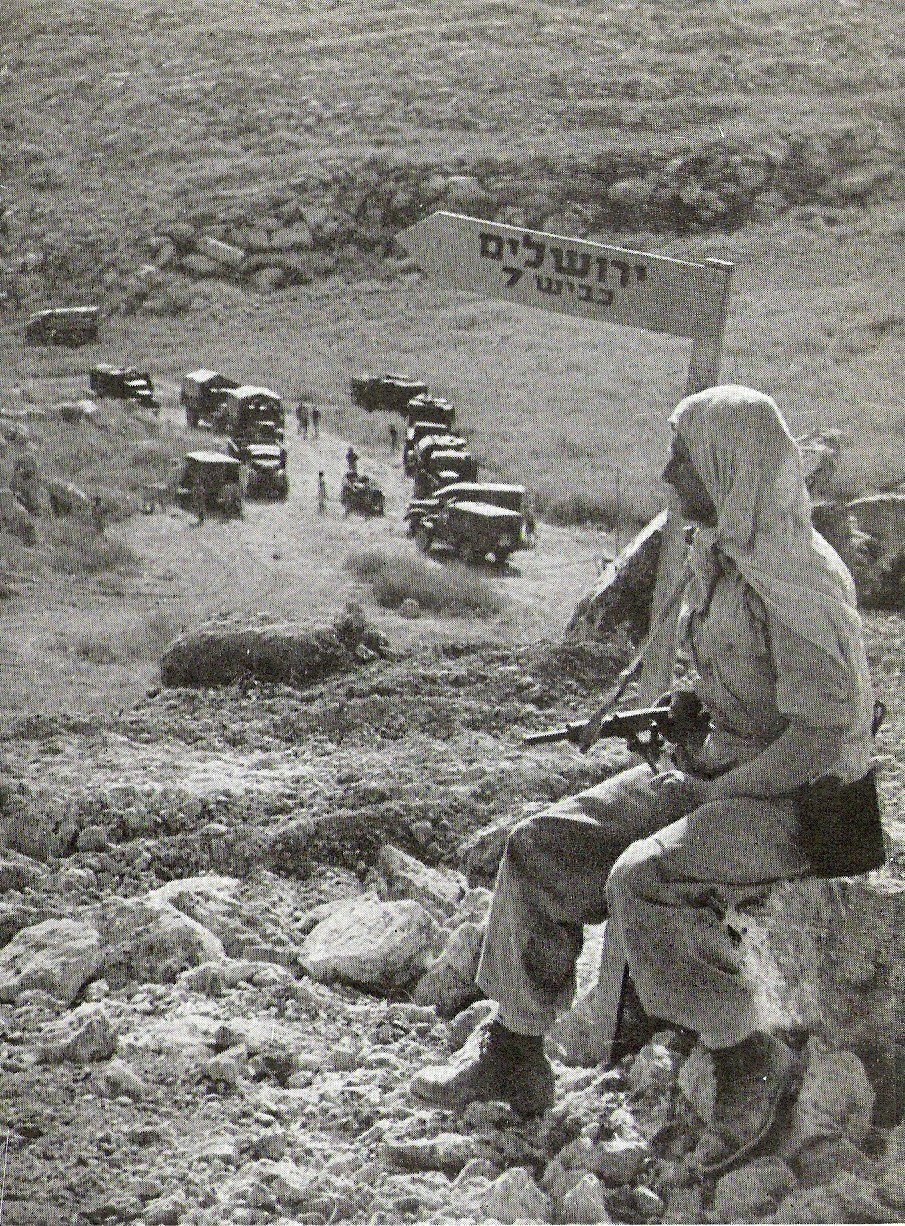
Burma Road convoy

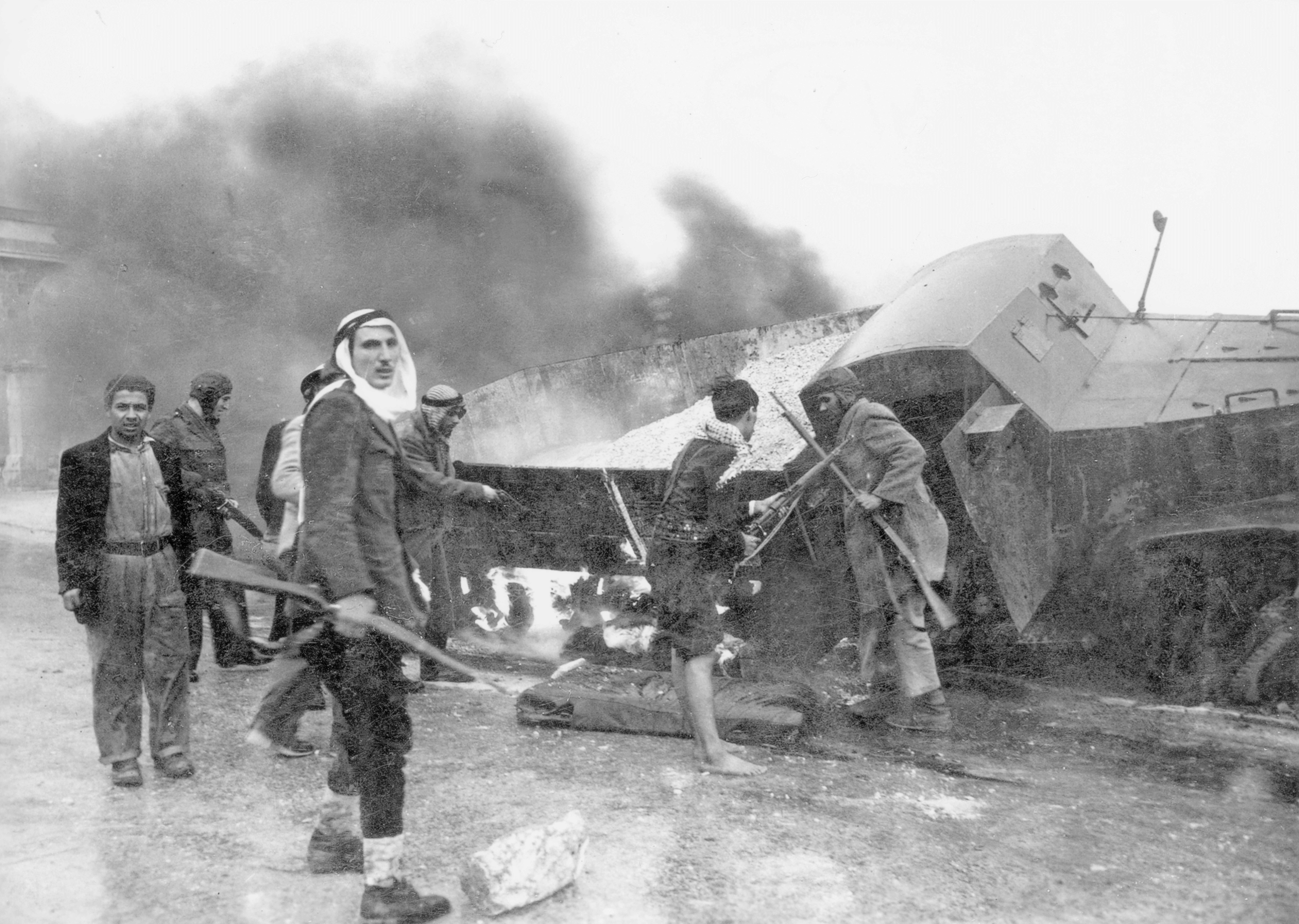
Arab ambush on a Jewish convoy truck

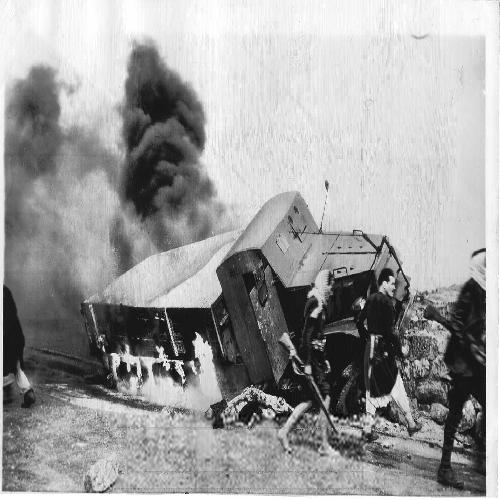
Arab ambush on a Jewish convoy truck

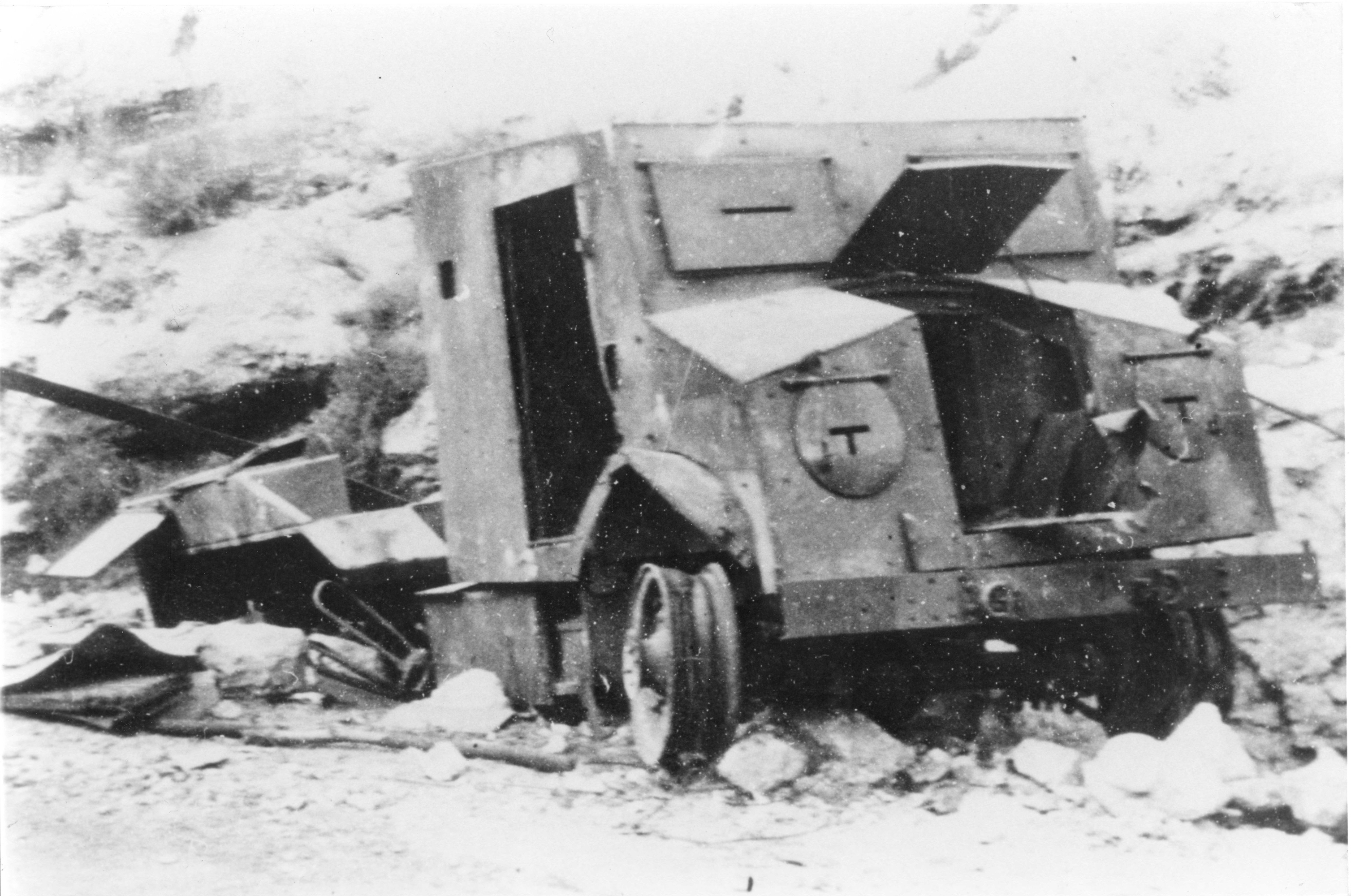
Aftermath of Arab ambush on a Jewish convoy truck

1947–1949 Palestine war truck wreck. June 7, 1950, Jerusalem Corridor

== Modern roads and railway in the area ==
Today, in addition to the Jerusalem – Tel Aviv highway (Highway 1), a number of additional routes lead to Jerusalem; route 443 covers the northern part of the corridor. Route 395 leads from Ein Kerem to the coast, via Ramat Raziel and Beit Shemesh, and continues south. Route 386 leads to the Elah Valley, via Bar Giora and Tzur Hadassah. A railway line is active in the corridor, next to the Sorek Stream, which is part of the historic Jaffa–Jerusalem railway.
