= Kesalon (biblical) =

Biblical site in the Judean Mountains

Kesalon (also called Ksalon, Chesalon, Chaslon, Chasalon; Hebrew: כְסָל֑וֹן) is a biblical site in the Judean Mountains, mentioned in the Book of Joshua (15:10) as part of the northern border of the territory allotted to the tribe of Judah:

Then it curved westward from Baalah to Mount Seir, ran along the northern slope of Mount Jearim (that is, Kesalon), continued down to Beth Shemesh and crossed to Timnah.

— Joshua 15:10, NIV

Kesalon is identified as a biblical settlement based on mentions by Eusebius’s Onomasticon (early 4th century CE) and the preservation of the name in the Palestinian village of Kasla (كسلا). Archaeological surveys by Aharoni, Dothan, and Yeivin uncovered remains from Iron Age (c. 1200 – c. 550 BC), supporting this identification.
