= Geva =

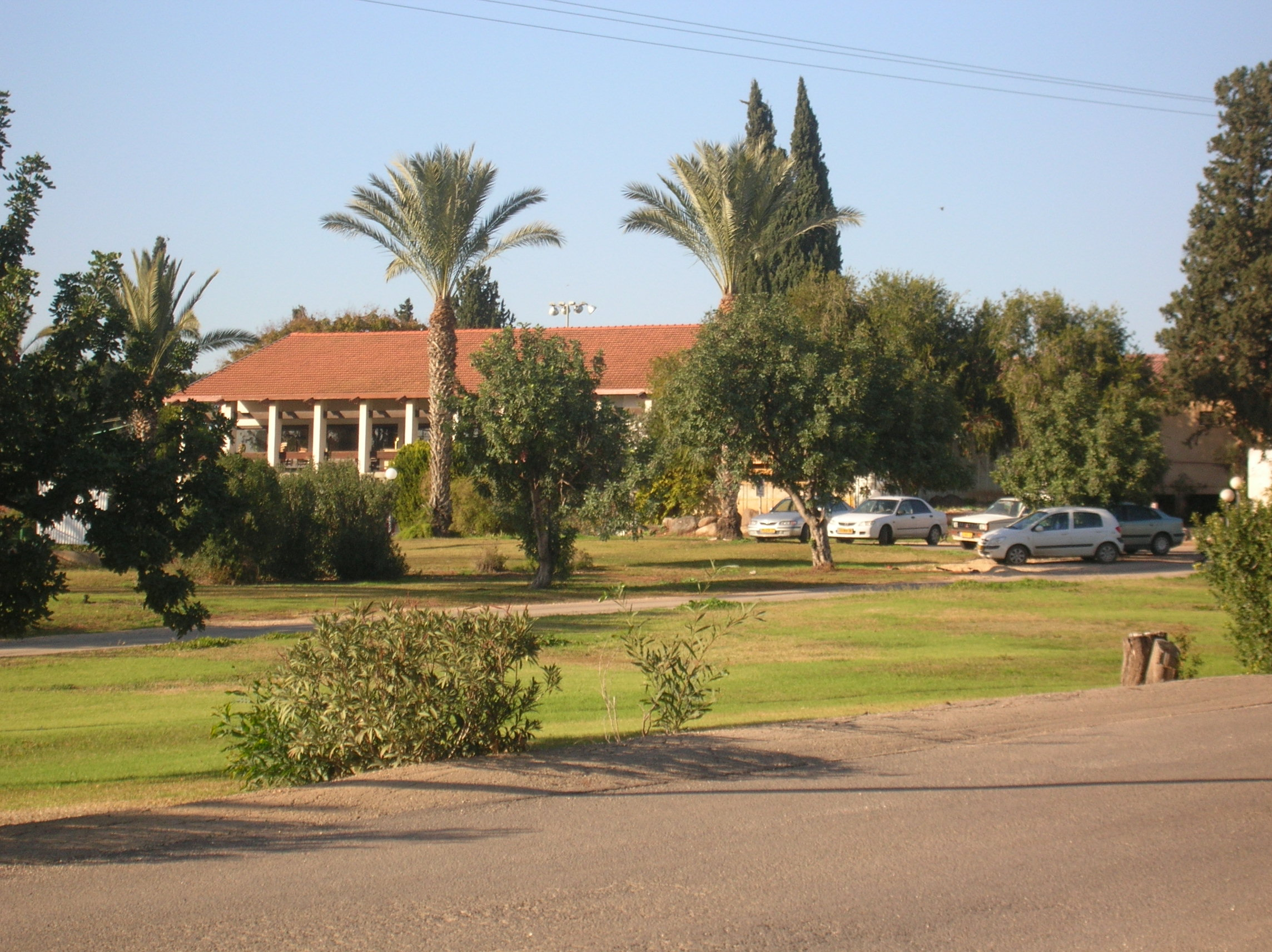

- Location within Jezreel Valley region of Israel
- Coordinates: 32°33′59″N 35°22′18″E
- Country: Israel
- District: Northern
- Subdistrict: Jezreel
- Council: Gilboa
- Affiliation: Kibbutz Movement
- Founded: 1922
- Founder: Polish and Russian Jews
- Population (2024): 622
- Website: www.kvgeva.org.il

Geva (Hebrew: גֶּבַע, lit. Hill) is a kibbutz in the Jezreel Valley in Israel. Located near the city of Afula, it falls under the jurisdiction of Gilboa Regional Council. In 2024 it had a population of 622.

== History ==
Geva was founded in 1921 by Jewish immigrants from Poland and Russia as the second and third wave of immigration. The community was targeted during the 1929 Palestine Riots in August of that year, and destroyed by fire. By 1948 it had a population of 439, which had grown to 506 at the end of 1951.

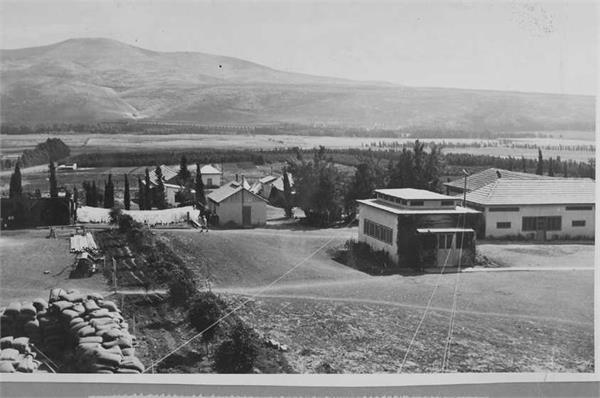
Geva 1939

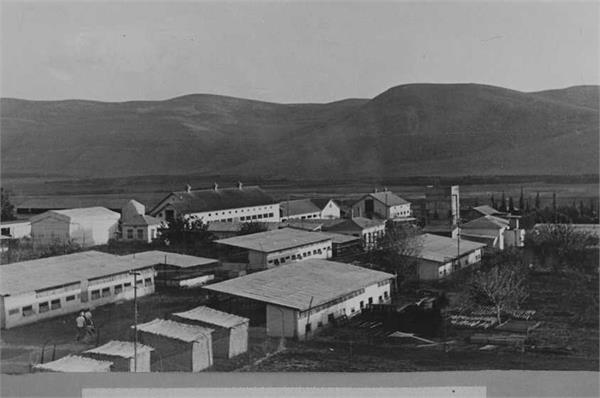
Geva 1942

The Gevatron singing troupe was established by members of Geva in 1948. It recorded over 20 albums. At the peak of its popularity in the 1980s, the troupe appeared at Yarkon Park in Tel Aviv before an audience of 120,000. It collaborated with some of Israel's leading singers, among them Yoram Gaon, Shoshana Damari and Yehudit Ravitz. In 1972, the Gevatron won the David's Harp prize, in 1992 it won the Histadrut prize, and in 2008, it won the Israel Prize.

== Notable people ==
- Shimon Peres (1923–2016), former Israeli prime minister and president
