= Rafi Milo =

Israeli major general

Rafael David Milo
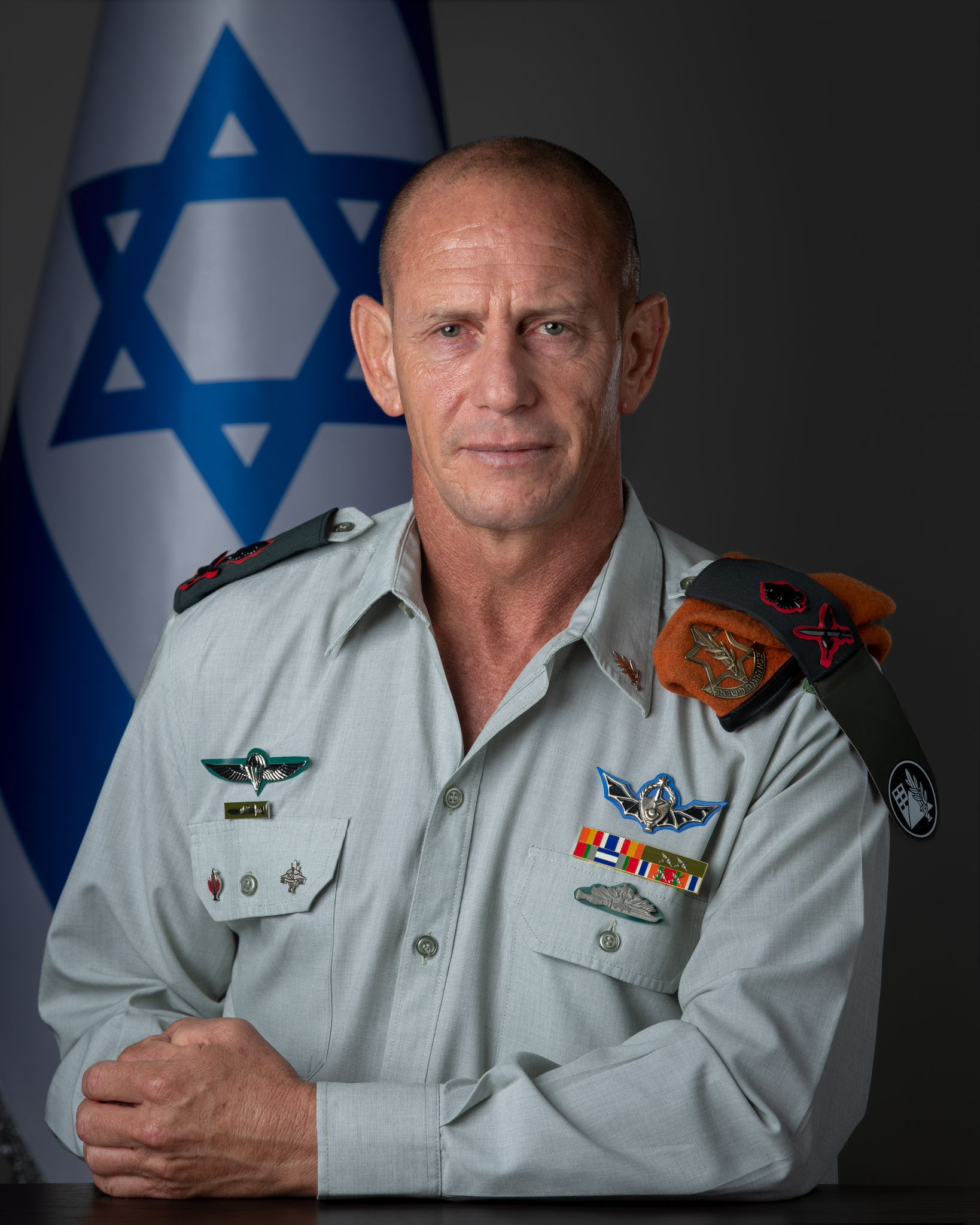
- Native name: רפאל דוד מילו
- Nickname: Rafi
- Born: April 17, 1972 (age 54); Kfar Yedidia, Israel
- Allegiance: Israel
- Branch: Israel Defense Forces
- Service years: 1990–present
- Rank: Aluf (Major General)
- Commands: Deputy Commander of the Egoz Unit; Golani reconnaissance unit; Shayetet 13; Etzioni Brigade; Baram Territorial Brigade; Shayetet 13; 80th "Edom" Territorial Division; 91st "Galilee" Territorial Division; IDF Command and Staff College; Home Front Command; Northern Command
- Conflicts: Security Zone in Lebanon; First Intifada; Second Intifada; 2006 Lebanon War; Operation Summer Rains; Operation Cast Lead; Operation Pillar of Defense; Operation Brother's Keeper; Operation Protective Edge; Operation Northern Shield; Operation Guardian of the walls; Operation Breaking Dawn; Operation Swords of Iron
- Awards: (2) Aluf Citation

Rafael David (Rafi) Milo (Hebrew: רָפָאֵל דָּוִד "רָפִי" מִילוֹא; born April 17, 1972) is an Israel Defense Forces major general (Aluf) who currently serves as the commander of the Northern Command.

Milo previously served as the Commander of the Homefront Command, the Israel Defense Forces, 91st "Galilee Territorial Division, 80th "Edom" Territorial Division, Shayetet 13, Baram Territorial Brigade and the Etzioni Brigade.

== Biography ==
Rafi Milo, son of Uri and Eva, was born in Moshav Kfar Yedidia. He was named after his uncle, Major (Rasan) Rafi Milo who was killed during Operation Raviv. He joined the IDF in August 1990 and volunteered for the naval special operations unit, Shayetet 13. After completing his training in Shayetet 13, he enlisted in an infantry officers course. As a Shayetet 13 platoon commander, he fought in the South Lebanon conflict as well as during Operation Accountability. In 1996, he was released from active service. but in the wake of the Ansariya ambush in 1997, he returned. Later he transferred to the Golani Brigade and became deputy commander of the Egoz Unit. He served as commander of the Golani reconnaissance unit during the Second Intifada.

In 2003, he was promoted to the rank of lieutenant colonel (Sgan-Aluf) and appointed commander of the 13th battalion of the Golani Brigade and served in that role until November 2005. On December 27, 2004, The Chief of Staff, Moshe Ya'alon, decided to reprimand him following an incident in which three Egyptian policemen were accidentally killed by the battalion under his command in the Gaza Strip. In November 2005, he commanded the brigade during the 2005 Hezbollah cross-border raid and participated in the killing of one of the Hezbollah militants. In the same month, An Israeli who surfed near the Manara cliff drifted towards Lebanese territory. Hezbollah saw the surfer and started moving towards him. Milo, in the sector with his battalion, arrived at the scene, and began a rescue operation while under Hezbollah fire. Milo crossed the fence and rescued the civilian. For his action to prevent the abduction of the citizen amidst the deterioration of the security situation on the northern border, he was awarded an Aluf citation by the commander of the Northern Command, Udi Adam. In 2005, he was appointed commander of a squadron in Shayetet 13, and served in the position until 2007. He led it (amongst other things) in the Second Lebanon War. During the war he led the main force in the Tyre raid. For his part in the war, including in that operation, he was awarded an Aluf citation by the commander of the Navy, David Ben-Besht.

In 2008, he was promoted to the rank of colonel (Aluf-Mishne) and was appointed commander of the Etzioni Brigade, during his service there, he lost his personal computer which had classified files and information. the Chief of Staff Gabi Ashkenazi, Determined as punishment that his appointment in 2010 as commander of Shayetet 13 will be canceled, and his possible promotion to the position will be delayed for two years. on August 25, 2010, he was appointed commander of the Baram Territorial Brigade, a role which he served it until June 2012. On June 19, 2012, he was appointed commander of Shayetet 13, a role which he served in until July 2, 2014. at the end of his service he left to study at the National Security College in Canada.

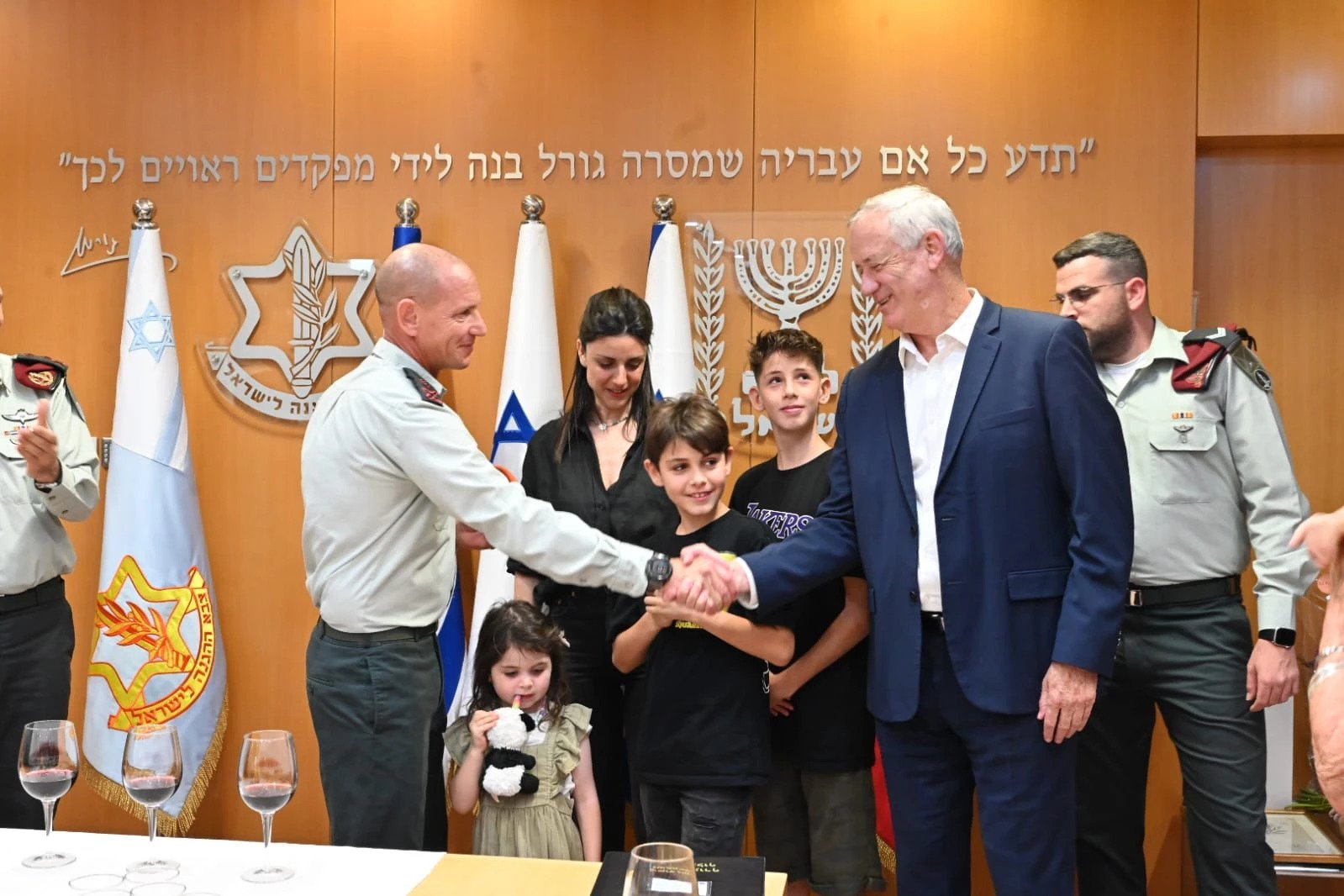
Rafi Milo (left) at his promotion ceremony to the rank of Major General.

On July 29, 2015, Milo was promoted to the rank of brigadier general (Tat-Aluf) and was appointed commander of the 80th "Edom" Territorial Division, a role which he served in until May 24, 2017. On July 18, 2017, he was appointed commander of the 91st "Galilee" Territorial Division. During his service in this position, he led the Northern Shield operation. At the end of the operation, he decided to examine for himself the other side of one of the Hezbollah tunnels. He did so on his own accord and without coordinating with his commanders, only after he believed that there was no longer any risk from doing so. He marched at the head of a small force along the tunnel to its end in the village of Ramyah in southern Lebanon. As a result, the Chief of Staff, Aviv Kochavi, decided to reprimand him and delay his promotion in rank until 2022. He finished his time in this position on August 12, 2019. In October 2019, he was appointed commander of the IDF Command and Staff College. In May 2020, he announced that he intends to resign from his position and retire from his military service, but in July 2020 he retracted the statement and said that he will not retire from the IDF. On June 30, 2022, he was promoted to the rank of major general (Aluf) and on July 18 started his position as commander of the Home Front Command. On August 13, 2025, Milo was appointed commander of the Northern Command.

== Awards and decorations ==
Rafael Milo was awarded three campaign ribbons for his service during three conflicts, as well as two Aluf Citation.

Aluf Citation	Aluf Citation	Second Lebanon War	South Lebanon Security Zone	Operation Protective Edge

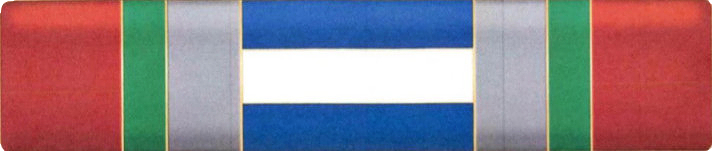

== Personal life ==
Milo has a wife and is the father of 3 children.
