= Shai Klapper =

Israeli military officer

- שי קלפר
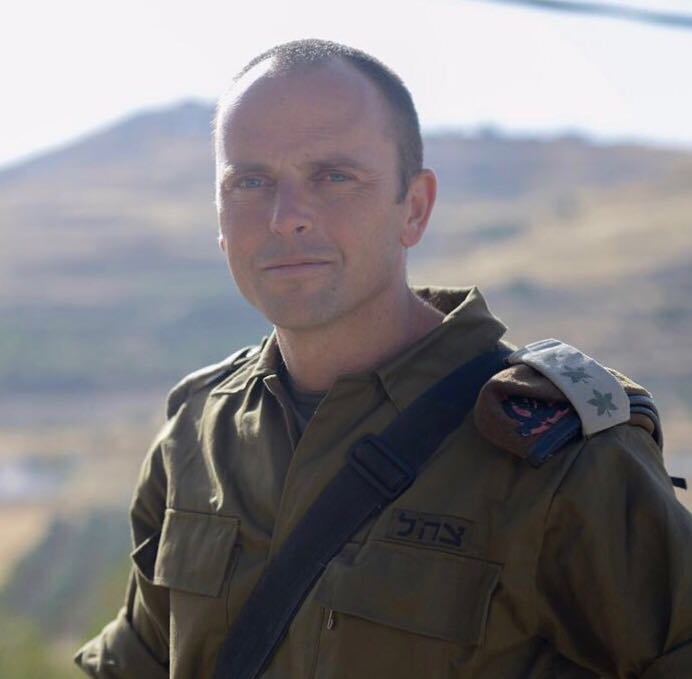
- Klapper in 2018
- Born: 8 January 1976 (age 50); Kfar Saba, Israel
- Alma mater: Yeshiva Shavei Hevron; Bar-Ilan University; United States Army War College
- Military career
- Allegiance: Israel
- Branch: Israel Defense Forces
- Service years: 1996–present
- Rank: Aluf (Major General)
- Conflicts: South Lebanon conflict; 2006 Lebanon War; 2014 Gaza War; 2024 Israeli invasion of Lebanon; 2026 Iran War
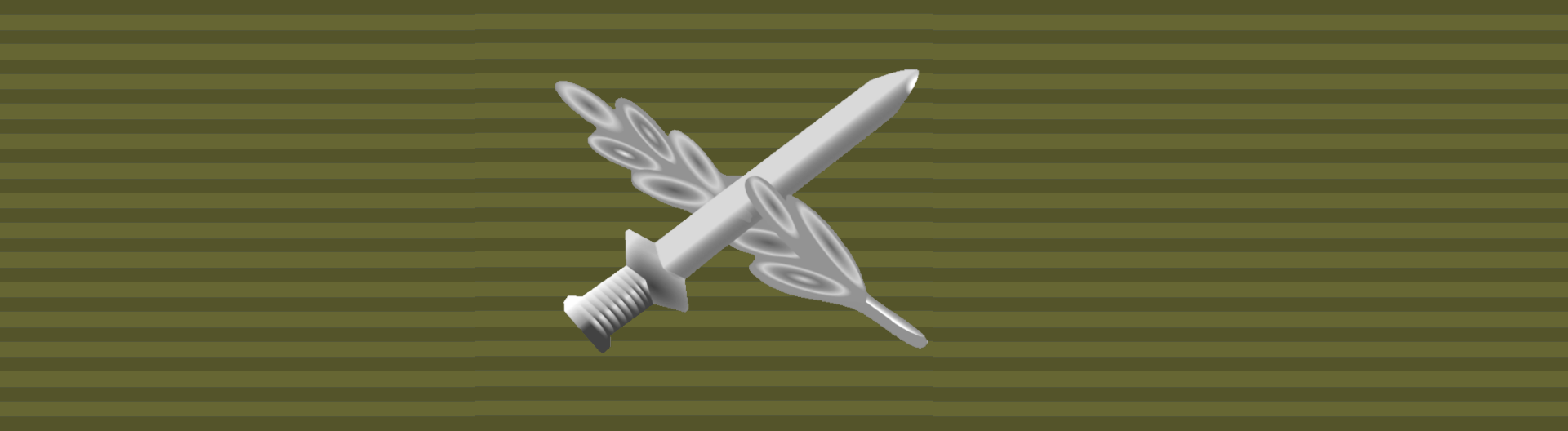
- Awards: Divisional Commander Citation

Shai Klapper (Hebrew: שי קלפר; born 8 January 1976) is an Israeli aluf who has served as commander of the Home Front Command of the Israel Defense Forces since 2025. Klapper served as commander of the Golani Brigade from 2018 until 2020, when he was replaced in the role by Barak Hiram.

== Early life and education ==
Shai Klapper was born on 8 January 1976 in Kfar Saba, Israel. He grew up in Sha'arei Tikva, an Israeli settlement in the West Bank. He attended the Yeshiva at Shavei Hevron, Bar-Ilan University, and the United States Army War College.

== Career ==
=== Golani Brigade ===
In 2005, Klapper was appointed as commander of the Golani Resistance Unit within the Golani Brigade until the end of the 2006 Lebanon War, later becoming deputy commander of the Brigade. After serving in a variety of other roles in the Israel Defense Forces, Klapper was appointed as commander of the Brigade in 2018. He was replaced in the role in 2020 by Barak Hiram.

=== 91st Division ===
Klapper served as the commander of the 91st Division from 2022 to 2025. Under his command the division took part in the 2024 Israeli invasion of Lebanon.

=== Home Front Command ===
In July 2025, it was announced that Klapper would replace aluf Rafi Milo as commander of the Home Front Command, with Milo being appointed as the commander of the Northern Command.

In February 2026, immediately prior to the 2026 Iran War, Klapper said that the National Rescue Unit had been placed on "full alert," with the Home Front Command shifting to a state of "immediate readiness" for conflict according to JFeed. Klapper addressed the Foreign Affairs and Defense Committee of the Knesset on 18 February, with Klapper telling the committee that "the Home Front Command will be a central arena in relevant operational scenarios and is a significant component of Israeli society's resilience and ability to save lives." On 2 March, the Home Front Command under Klapper mobilized approximately 20,000 reservists. In a situation assessment, Klapper told senior officials that Israel "entered this campaign with advance preparation and high readiness. The Israeli home front is strong and experienced, and the readiness and resilience impact the IDF's performance deep in enemy territory."
