= Yekutiel Adam =

Israeli general (1927–1982)

- יקותיאל אדם
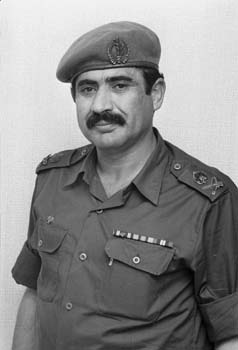
- Born: November 3, 1927; Tel Aviv, Mandatory Palestine
- Died: June 10, 1982 (aged 54); Damour, Lebanon
- Relatives: Major General Udi Adam (son)
- Military career
- Allegiance: Israel
- Branch: Haganah; Israel Defense Forces
- Service years: 1942–1982
- Rank: Aluf (Major General)
- Nickname: Kuti (Hebrew: קותי)
- Commands: Golani Brigade, Israeli Southern Command
- Conflicts: 1948 Arab–Israeli War; Six-Day War; Operation Entebbe (commander, not on the ground); 1982 Lebanon War †
- Other work: Appointed head of the Mossad but killed during the 1982 Lebanon War before he could take office.

Yekutiel "Kuti" Adam (Hebrew: יקותיאל "קותי" אדם; November 3, 1927 – June 10, 1982) was an Israeli general and former Deputy Chief of Staff of the Israel Defense Forces. He was killed by a Palestinian fighter during the early stage of the Lebanon War, a few days before taking on his new position as head of Mossad. Adam is the highest ranked Israeli officer to have been killed in battle.

== Childhood and marriage ==
He was born in Tel Aviv to Yehuda and Elisheva Adam (formerly Adamov). He was named after his grandfather, Yekutiel Ravayev, who was killed in combat defending Petah Tikva from Arabs in 1916. His family were Mountain Jews from the Caucasus region.

In March 1950 Adam married and built a house in Tel Aviv.

== Career and education ==
At the age of 15, Yekutiel joined the Haganah. At 20, he became a commander.

On May 1, 1948, he was one of the commanders who captured the Arab village of Salame in the south of Tel Aviv. He later joined an elite Haganah unit that conducted raids into enemy territory.

At that time, he became an officer in the IDF, with the rank of lieutenant. Adam rose quickly through the ranks. In 1952, he became a captain in the Givati Brigade. He went on to command the Beersheba bloc as a lieutenant colonel.

He went on to study in the war academy in France in 1964–1966 and returned to assume the rank of colonel. In the Six-Day War, he served under Ariel Sharon, proving his worth. Following the war, he became commander of the Golani Brigade. The Golani Brigade was responsible for keeping the peace in the north during the War of Attrition. During this time, Adam was promoted to brigadier general and served as the vice commander of the IDF's Northern Command until the end of the Yom Kippur War.

In 1974, Adam was moved to the Sinai, where he became a major general and eventually went on to head the Southern Command.

He was the commander of the Operation Entebbe, the 1976 raid that led to the rescue of hostages from pro-Palestinian militants at Entebbe Airport in Uganda.

In 1978, he went to the United States to study and returned to become the Deputy Chief of Staff, under Rafael Eitan, and head of the Directorate of Operations.

In 1982, Adam went to the United States again to study, this time at the University of California, Berkeley. He came back to Israel after Prime Minister Menachem Begin announced Adam's appointment as head of the Mossad, in replacement of Yitzhak Hofi.

== Death ==
Adam was killed in the 1982 Lebanon War before he could take up his post. On June 10 of that year, the fourth day of the war, Adam and a group of Israeli officers were commanding operations from an appropriated villa in Dawha near the town of Damour some 12 kilometers south of Beirut. When the area was shelled by enemy mortars, Adam and two other officers descended to the basement to take cover. A group of Palestinian fighters hiding there opened fire, killing Adam as well as Col. Chaim Sela. Yekutiel Adam was deputy Chief of Staff and thus the highest ranking IDF officer ever to be killed in battle. The identity of Adam's killers was never clarified. Some sources identify one of them as a Palestinian minor who survived. An IDF medic who served in an Israeli military prison during the war witnessed an officer point to a 15-year-old boy among a group of prisoners and said: "You see this boy? He murdered the late Yekutiel Adam".

Adam was buried in Kiryat Shaul cemetery, Tel Aviv.

== Family and legacy ==
His son Udi Adam has followed in his father's footsteps becoming a Major General in the Israel Defense Forces and later was appointed chief of Northern Command.

A street was named after him in Ashkelon, and a main road in North Jerusalem. The Israeli Institute of Technology has named the Adam Yekutiel soil-machine laboratory after him. The IDF base called Adam Facility (Mitkan Adam), home to the Israeli Counter Terror School and other training facilities for Sayarot, shooting and sniping is named after Yekutiel Adam.
