= Yoel Strick =

Israeli General (b. 1966)

- יואל סטריק
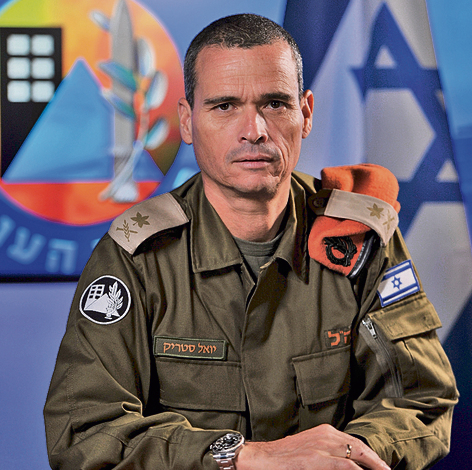
- Yoel Strick, 2017
- Born: 1966 (age 59–60); Dimona, Israel
- Military career
- Allegiance: Israel
- Branch: Israel Defense Forces
- Service years: 1985–2021
- Rank: Aluf (Major General)
- Unit: Givati Brigade
- Commands: Shaked infantry battalion; Regional Brigade in the Gaza Division; Givati Brigade; 80th Division; 91st Division; Operations Division of the IDF's Operations Directorate; Home Front Command; Northern Command; Ground Forces Command
- Conflicts: South Lebanon conflict (1985–2000); First Intifada; Second Intifada; 2006 Lebanon War; Operation Cast Lead; Operation Pillar of Defense; Operation Protective Edge; Operation Northern Shield

Yoel Strick (Hebrew: יואל סטריק; born 1966) is an Israeli Major General (Aluf) in the IDF reserves and formerly commanded the Ground Forces Command.

== Military service ==
Strick began his military service in the Israel Defense Forces in 1985, as a cadet in the Israeli Air Force (IAF) Flight School. He did not complete his pilot training, and transferred to the Paratroopers Brigade. He served as a soldier and a squad leader. He became an infantry officer after completing Officer Candidate School and return to the Paratroopers Brigade as a platoon leader. Afterwards, he transferred to Givati Brigade, and served as a company commander. During his career Strick led the Brigade's Anti-tank company in counter-guerrilla operations in South Lebanon. Afterwards, he commanded a battalion in Givati, the Battalion of the IDF Infantry Officers' School, the 5th Infantry Brigade, and the Regional Brigade in the Gaza division counter-terror operations in the Second Intifada.

In 2005, he was given command of the Givati Brigade, and he led its forces during 2006 Lebanon War. Afterwards, he commanded the 80th Division, 91st Division and the Operations Division of the IDF's Operations Directorate. In 2015 he was appointed head of the Home Front Command. In 2017 Strick was appointed head of the Northern Command, and commanded Operation Northern Shield. In 2019, Strick was appointed as commander of the Ground Forces Command, replacing Kobi Barak.
