= Ori Gordin =

Israeli general

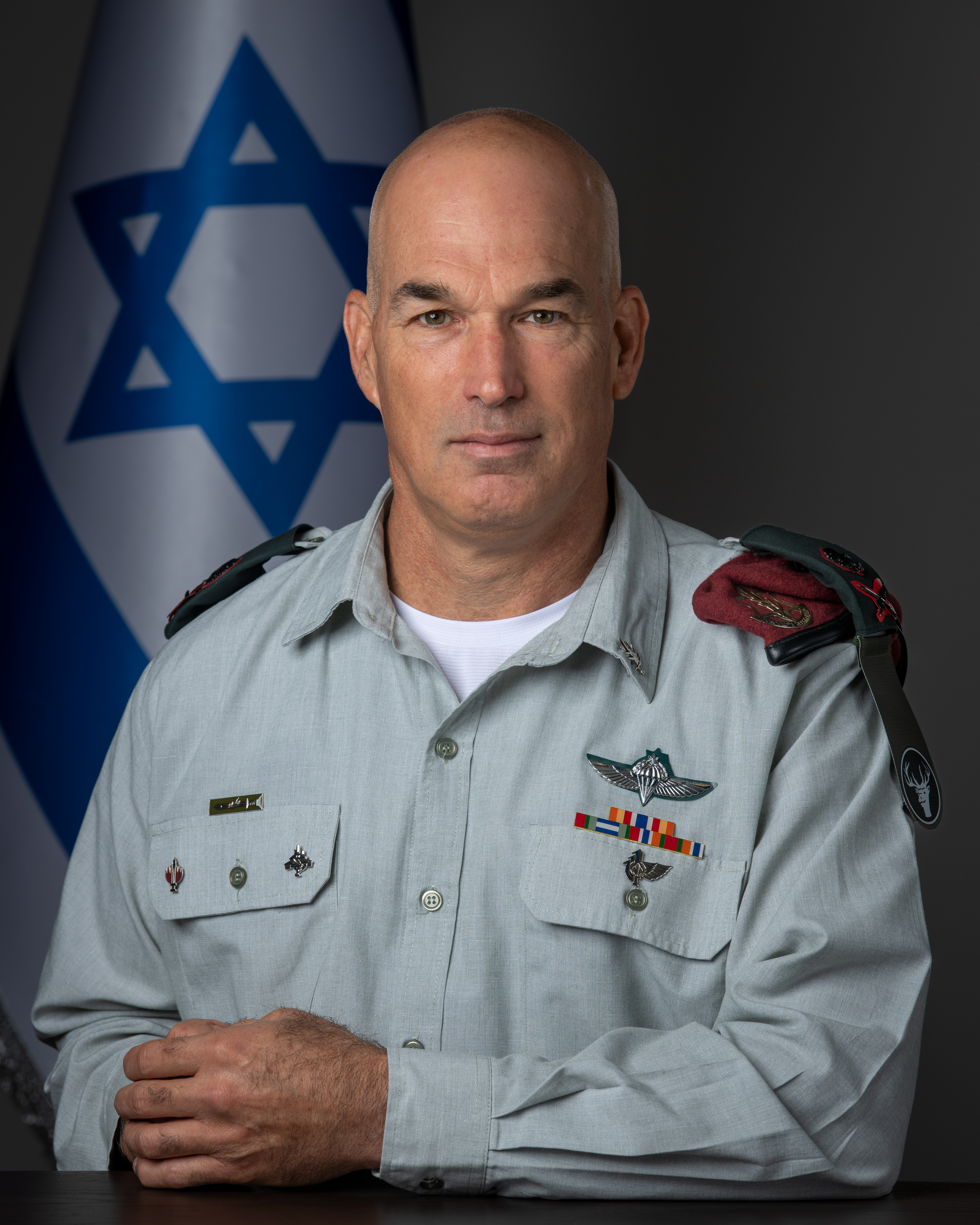
- Native name: אורי גורדין
- Born: 15 July 1969 (age 56); San Diego, California, U.S.
- Allegiance: Israel
- Branch: Israel Defense Forces
- Service years: 1988–present
- Rank: Aluf (Major General)
- Commands: Sayeret Matkal; 55th Paratroopers Brigade; Nahal Brigade; 98th Paratroopers Division; Home Front Command; Northern Command
- Conflicts: First Intifada; South Lebanon conflict (1985–2000); Second Intifada; Operation Defensive Shield; 2006 Lebanon War; Operation Cast Lead; Operation Pillar of Defense; Operation Brother's Keeper; Operation Protective Edge; Operation Guardian of the Walls; Operation Breaking Dawn; Operation Swords of Iron

Ori Gordin (Hebrew: אורי גורדין; born 15 July 1969) is an IDF Major General (Aluf), who served as the commander of the Northern Command and the Home Front Command, commander of the 98th Paratroopers Division, commander of the Nahal Brigade, commander of the 55th Paratroopers Brigade and commander of Sayeret Matkal.

== Biography ==
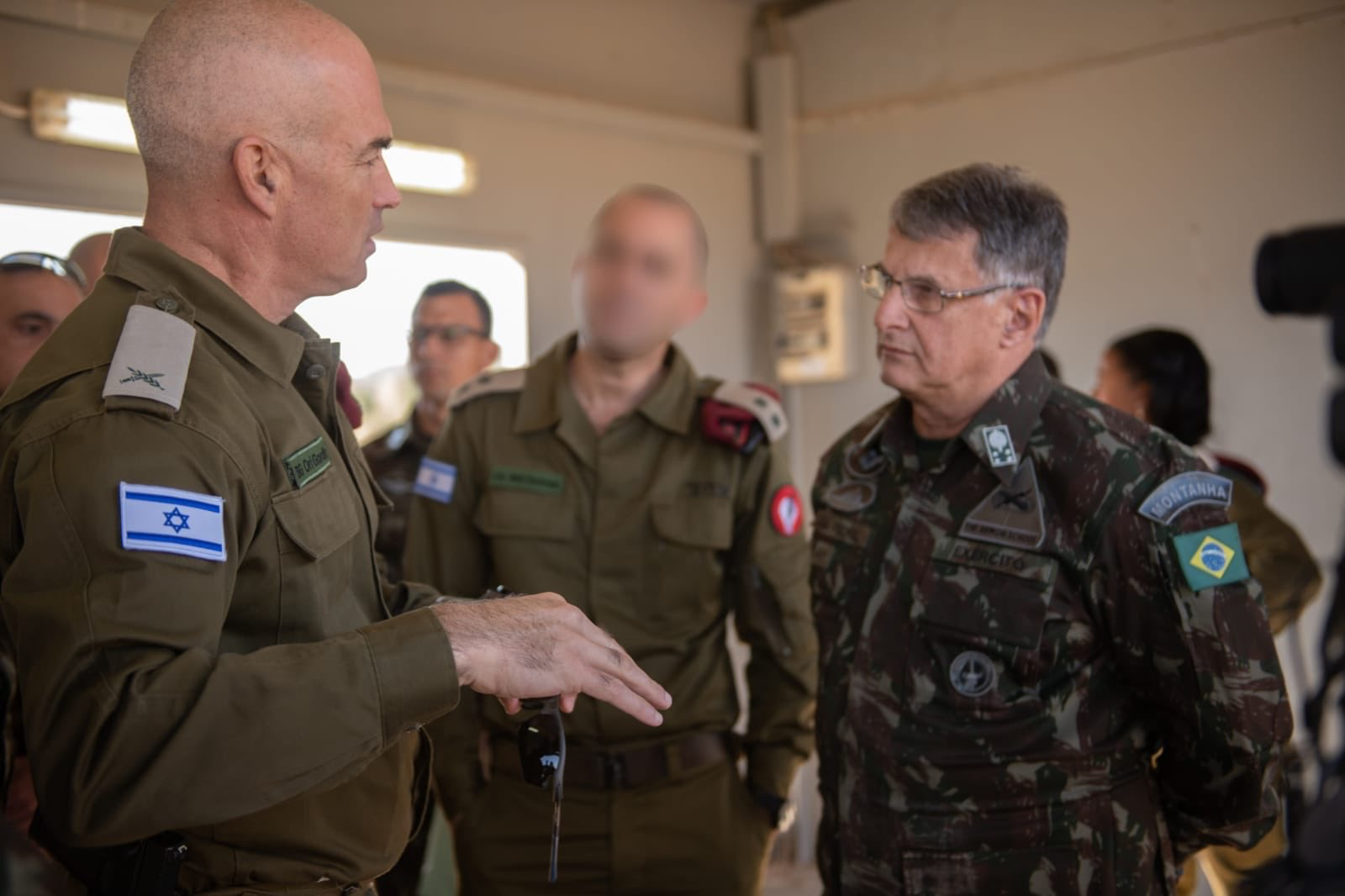
Uri Gordin talks with the commander of the Ground Forces of the Brazilian Army, General Edson Leal Pujol, December 2019

Gordin is the son of Hillel and Rachel. Born in San Diego, California, in the United States, where his parents stayed during their studies. In 1971 his family returned to Israel and he grew up and was educated in Kibbutz Yotvata.

After a year of service as a youth guide in Afula, he enlisted in the IDF in November 1988, and volunteered in the special forces unit Sayeret Matkal. After finishing the infantry officers course, he returned to Sayeret Matkal and became a squad commander. Later he served as a platoon commander, and after that he was appointed the deputy commander of the unit.

He was later promoted to the rank of lieutenant colonel (Sgan Aluf) and appointed head of the planning branch in the special operations system of the military intelligence directorate, and served in this position, among other things, in the Second Lebanon War. During the war, he served as one of the commanders of the forces served in Operation Sharp and Smooth. He was appointed commander of Sayeret Matkal, and served in the position between 2007-2010. In September 2009, while serving as the commander of the unit, he was promoted to the rank of colonel (Aluf Mishne), as a token of appreciation for the Sayeret Matkal's performance under his command, and the unit was awarded the Chief of Staff citation. At the end of his post as commander of the unit, he went to study in the United States.

In 2011 he was appointed commander of the 55th Paratroopers Brigade, and served in his positions until May 2014. On May 22, 2014 he was appointed commander of the Nahal Brigade, and led the brigade, among other things, in Operation Brother's Keeper and Operation Protective Edge, on May 28, 2015 he finished his position as commander of the Nahal. On July 2, 2015, he was promoted to the rank of brigadier general (Tat Aluf) and appointed commander of the 98th Paratroopers Division, during his position the Oz Brigade was established and subordinated to the 98th Paratroopers Division. He finished his position on November 16, 2017. In April 2018, he was appointed commander of the Israeli Ground Forces' chief of staff. On May 11, 2020, he was promoted to the rank of major general (Aluf) and on May 19, he assumed his position as the commander of the Home Front Command, serving in this position during the COVID-19 pandemic and in Operation Guardian of the walls, among others. He served in this position until July 18, 2022.

On September 11, 2022 Gordin was appointed commander of the Northern Command. He served at this position during the conflict between Israel and Hezbollah that started on 8 October 2023, following Hamas' October 7 attacks on Israel, which led in October 2024 to Israel invading Lebanon. Gordin completed his term as commander of the Northern Commend on August 13, 2025, and was replaced by Rafi Milo.

=== Awards and decorations ===
Gordin was awarded three campaign ribbons for his service during three wars.

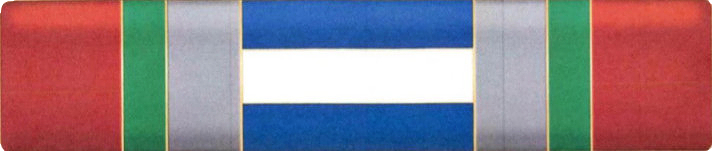

Second Lebanon War	South Lebanon Security Zone	Operation Protective Edge

== Personal life ==
Gordin lives in Sitria, is married to Miri and has three children. Has a bachelor's degree in electrical engineering from Tel Aviv University, and a master's degree in public administration from Harvard University, where he studied as part of the Wexner Foundation program.
