= Moshe Tzadok =

Polish zionist

- משה צדוק
- Moshe Tzadok (2nd from the left), November 9, 1949
- Born: Moshe Lehrer Tzadok; July 1, 1913; Radom, Poland
- Died: March 15, 1964 (aged 50); Israel
- Burial place: Kiryat Shaul Military Cemetery
- Spouse: Hadassah Petrushka (Hebrew: הדסה פטרושקה)
- Military career
- Allegiance: Israel
- Branch: Haganah; Israel Defense Forces
- Service years: 1933 - April 1956
- Rank: Aluf
- Commands: Head of the Manpower Directorate, May 1947–1949; Head of the Israeli Southern Command, 1951-1954; Head of the Israeli Northern Command, 1954–1956
- Conflicts: 1936–39 Arab revolt in Palestine; 1947–1949 Palestine war
- Other work: Head of the Division of Interior and Construction of the Ministry of Defense

Moshe Lehrer Tzadok (sometimes spelled Moshe Zadok; Hebrew: משה צדוק (לֶרֶר); July 1, 1913 - March 15, 1964) was Haganah fighter and later an IDF major general, first head of the Manpower Directorate during the 1947–1949 Palestine war, and head of the Israeli Northern and Southern Command during the early 1950s. After retiring from the IDF, Tzadok became the head of the Division of Interior and Construction of the Ministry of Defense.

== Biography ==
Tzadok was born on July 1, 1913, to Mendel and Nechama Lehrer in a small town of Żelechów near Radom, Poland. After completing his junior year, Tzadok continued his education in a vocational school sponsored by ORT in Warsaw, the capital of Poland.

Tzadok became a Zionist from the age of 14 when he joined the Zionist youth movement in his hometown. In 1933 Tzadok immigrated to Israel. Soon after arriving in Israel he joined the Haganah. In 1936 he graduated from the Juara training base in Ramat Menashe, in northern Israel.

During the early 1940s Tzadok became a prominent member of the Haganah. Prior to the Haganah's capture of Haifa, he served as the Fire chief of the Haifa Fire Department which facilitated covert Haganah operations in the city. Additionally, he thought Haganah courses.

Tzadok became the first head of the Manpower Directorate in May 1947, shortly after its foundation. Tzadok continued to serve in that capacity with the rank of Aluf after the formation of the Israel Defense Forces on June 27, 1948. In the summer of 1949 he married Hadassah Petrushka. The couple had no children.

In 1950 Moshe was appointed Inspector General of the IDF and in March of that year he became the commander of the Eighth Command which was established to organize military reserve in the Tel Aviv area. On October 17, 1951, he was appointed head of the Southern Command, a position he held until February 1, 1954. He was then appointed head of the Israeli Northern Command until April 20, 1956, when he was released from his service in the army after 23 years of military service. His position was taken over by Yitzhak Rabin.

=== Later years and death ===
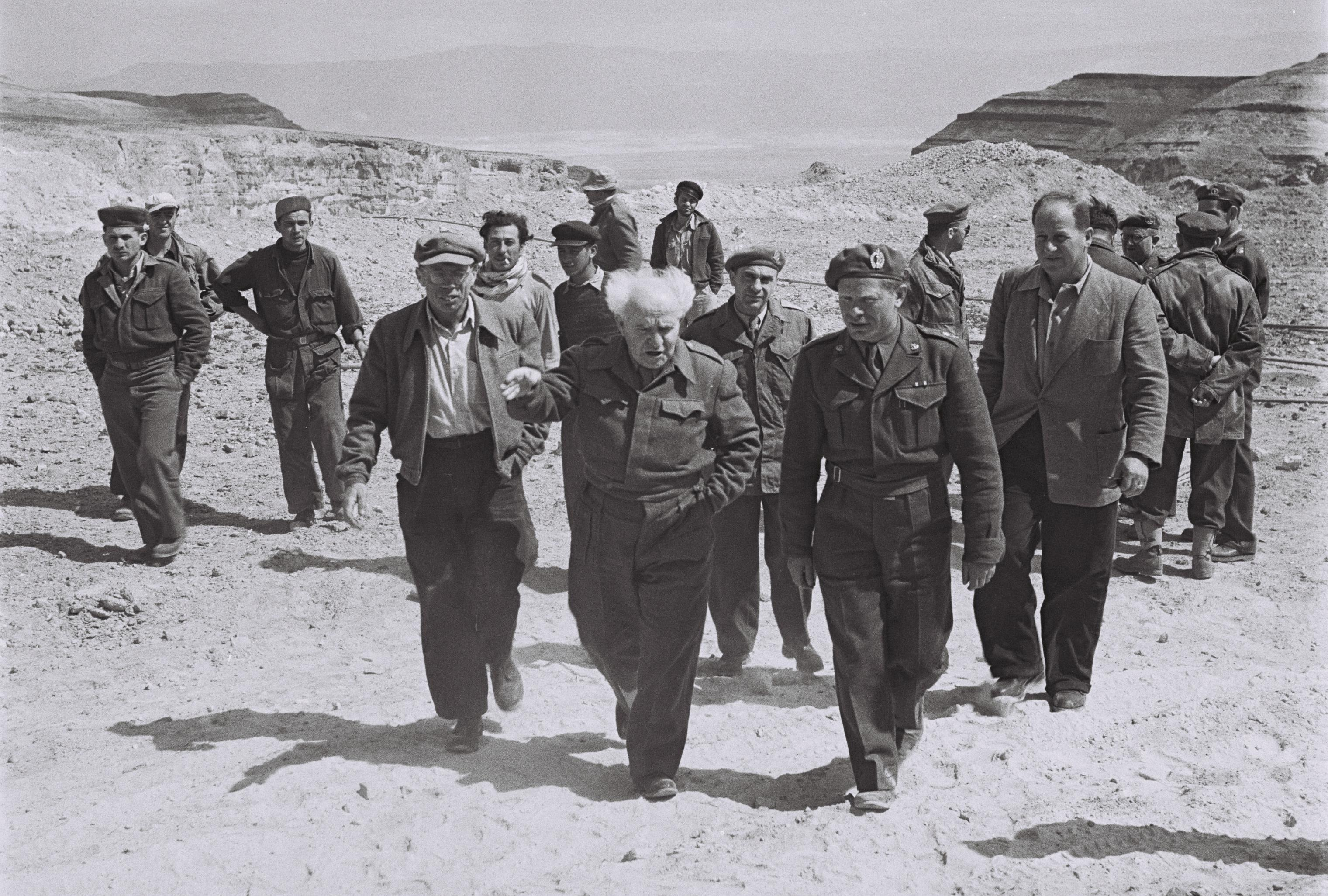
David Ben-Gurion and Moshe Tzadok during a Dead Sea tour on March 22, 1952.

In 1957, at the age of 44 after passing the Bagrut he started learning at the Faculty of Economics and Political Science at the Hebrew University. He graduated in 1960 and in 1961 he was appointed head of the Division of Interior and Construction of the Ministry of Defense. Moshe Zadok died of an illness in 1964, at the age of 50. He was buried in Kiryat Shaul Military Cemetery
