= Home Front Command =

Regional command of the Israel Defense Forces

- פיקוד העורף
- Active: 1992–present
- Country: Israel
- Size: ~65,000 reserve soldiers
- Part of: Israel Defense Forces
- Garrison/HQ: Ramla, on the site of a former RAF Airbase
- Colors: Orange - recognized around the world as a color associated with search and rescue

Commanders
- Current commander: Aluf Shai Klapper
- Notable commanders: Yair Golan - later became deputy Chief of Staff and deputy minister of economy

Insignia
- Flag

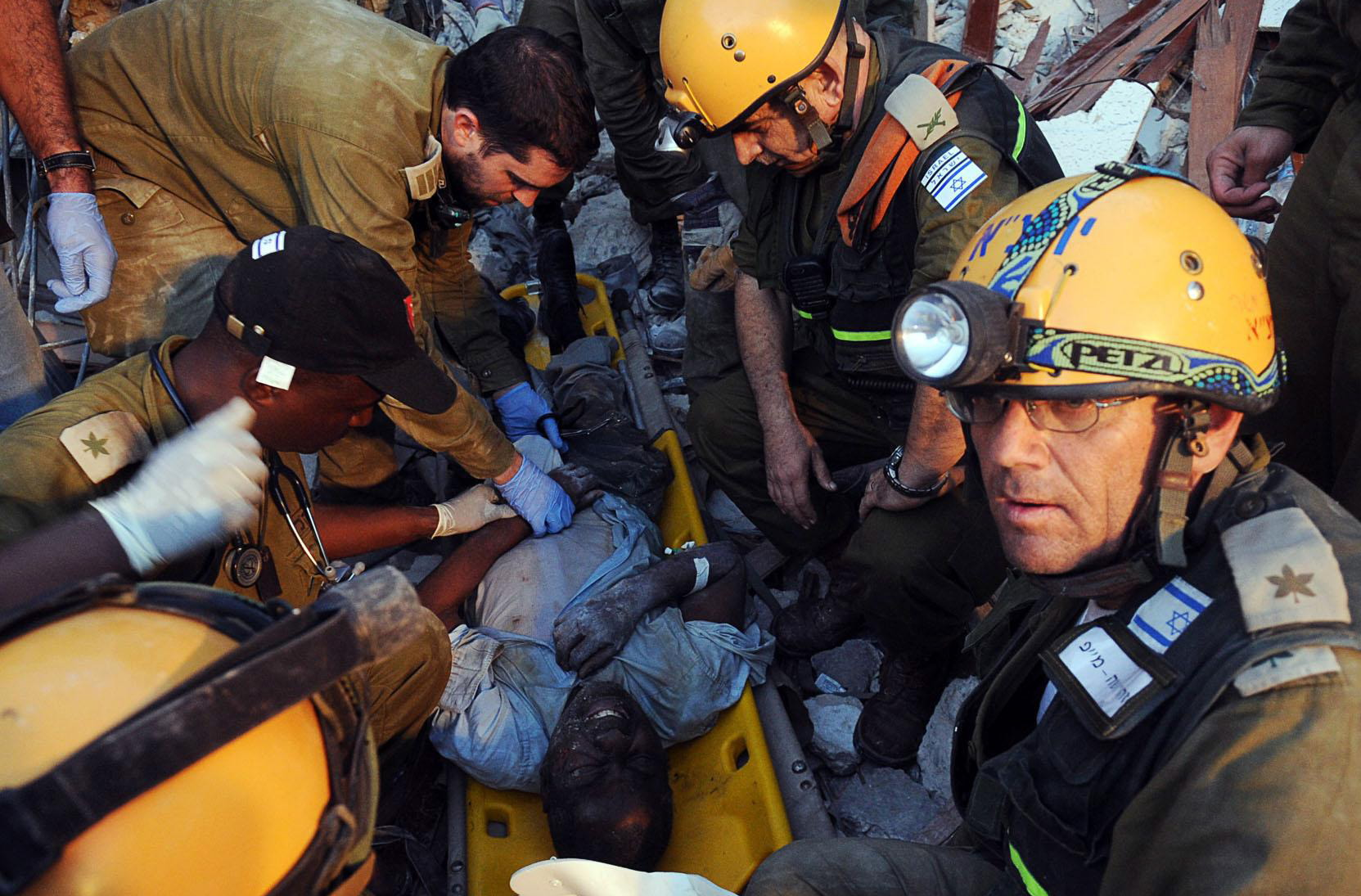
Search and Rescue Unit of the Home Front Command rescue a victim of the 2010 Haiti earthquake

The Home Front Command (Hebrew: פיקוד העורף, Pikud HaOref, also referred to by the Hebrew-language acronym Pakar) is an Israel Defense Forces military district command responsible for civil protection.

It was created in February 1992 in response to the lessons of the Gulf War, which was the first war since the 1948 Arab–Israeli War in which centers of civilian population faced significant threat. The command is responsible for preparing the civilian population of Israel for conflict or disaster, assisting the population during crisis and contributing to post-crisis reconstruction.

== Mission ==
The mission of the Home Front Command is to protect civilian lives. It prepares the civilian space before a conflict, supports it during a conflict, carries out search and rescue operations and assists in the rapid restoration of the civilian space after a conflict has ended. The Home Front Command publishes regular instructions for civil defense, especially in times of emergency, and operates a telephone emergency center numbered 104.

This district command should not be confused with Unit 669. The Home Front Command's search and rescue unit operates within Israel and is intended to rescue civilians, primarily operating in times of natural disasters, while Unit 669 is the Israeli Air Force's Tactical Combat Search and Rescue (CSAR) unit that rescues combatants behind enemy lines.

== Fields of responsibility ==
As per the Home Front Command's website, its fields responsibilities are:

- To draft and publish the rulebook of civil defense.
- To prepare and execute plans for civil defense for the entire country and all its territory.
- To train, guide, and operate Magen David Adom in Israel (MDA), the firefighting and rescue services, and the other assistant organizations regarding the fulfillment of their duties in the field of civil defense.
- To guide the population on the home front as well as all officials in the home front theater during attacks or unique situations on the home front as well as issue appropriate instructions.
- To guide local authorities regarding the fulfillment of their duties in the field of civil defense.
- To coordinate the activities of government ministries, private factories, national infrastructure, and emergency organizations on issues related to civil defense.
- To draft policies for civil defense for all areas and in coordination with area commands.
- To serve as the competent authority, as defined by law, for the issue of shelter and to serve as an authority, as defined by the Civil Defense Regulations for the matter of dangerous materials.
- To determine the way citizens are alerted, including specifying sirens and all-clear signals, their distribution, and their operation through various methods.
- To construct a system to detect, identify, and decontaminate areas affected by chemical or biological warfare on the home front and to operate that system during incidents of civil defense.
- To store and distribute personal defensive kits to the population in accordance with the regulations in the Civil Defense Regulations (defense kits) 5741-1990 and in accordance with government decisions.
- To operate the necessary powers to execute rescue and lifesaving activities as determined by law.

== History ==
Older coloured variant of the logo

Until the establishment of the Command, responsibility for the Home Front fell under the Civilian Defense's Chief Officer Corps Command and under Regional Defense. During that time, the three regional commands had their own home front commands. After the first Persian Gulf War, these organizations were unified and the Home Front Command was created. It is currently headed by Aluf Rafi Milo.

The role of the Homefront command as a civil defense service are embodied in the Israeli civil defense laws of 1951 as well as other government regulations and decisions. Civil defense is defined in law as follows: "The measures taken to defend against any attack, or the danger the attack poses to the civil population, or to minimize the outcome of such an attack to remove weaponry which is not for self-defense."

In 2021, the Home Front Command released an application for iPhone and Android that provides localized alerts to missiles and other dangers. Although it typically only works for emergencies within Israel and the Palestinian Territories, in its reach was expanded to cover the 2024 and 2025 host cities of Eurovision, due to fears of anti-Israel violence targeting Israelis and local Jewish communities.

== Command organization ==
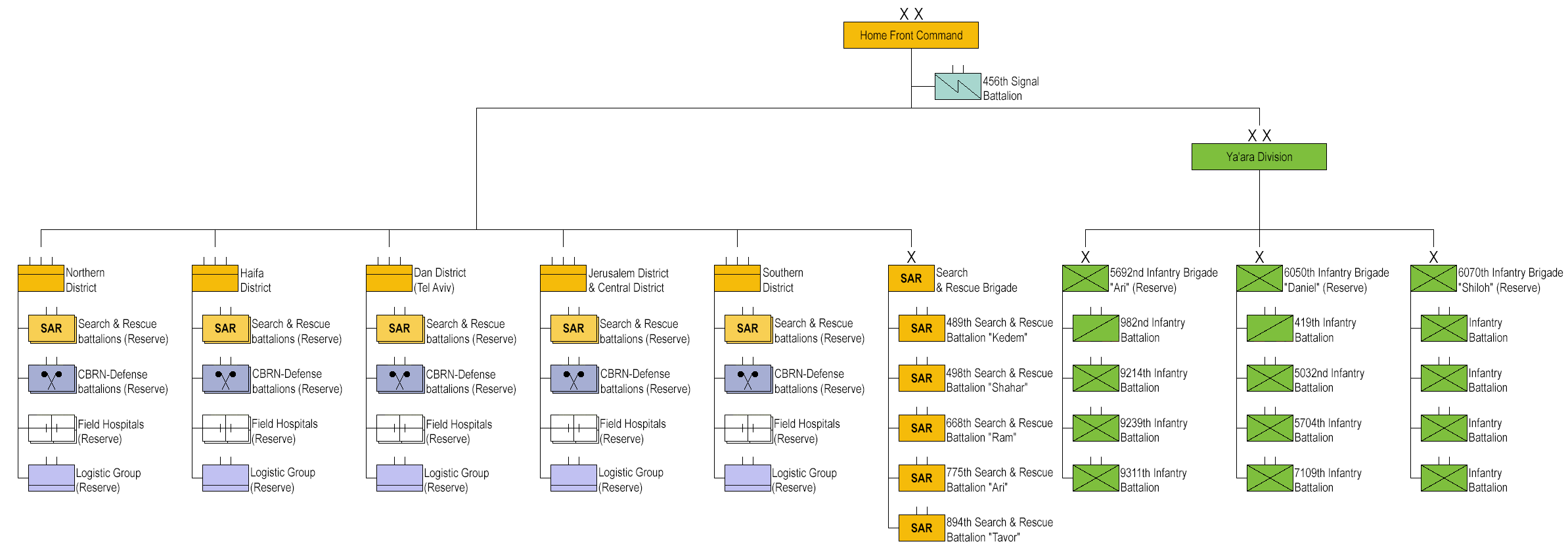
Home Front Command organization as of November 2026

The Home Front Command is divided into five districts, field 26 search and rescue battalions, 13 CBRN defense battalions, 26 military hospitals, and 5 logistic groups, all of which are staffed by reservists. Additionally, the Home Front Command also includes the following active units: the Search & Rescue Brigade, which consists of five battalions and the 456th Signal Battalion, as well as the reserver National Search & Rescue Unit. The command also includes the reserve Ya'ara Division with three infantry brigades.

- Home Front Command
  - Northern District
  - Haifa District
  - Dan District
  - Jerusalem District and Central District
  - Southern District
  - Search & Rescue Brigade
    - 489th Search & Rescue Battalion "Kedem" ("East")
    - 498th Search & Rescue Battalion "Shahar" ("Dawn")
    - 668th Search & Rescue Battalion "Ram"
    - 775th Search & Rescue Battalion "Ari"
    - 894th Search & Rescue Battalion "Tavor"
  - Brigade "Arbel" (Home Front Command training brigade; formed in 2026)
    - Headquarters Battalion
    - Home Front Professions School
    - Home Front Training Base
  - Ya'ara Division
    - 5692nd Infantry Brigade "Ari" (Reserve), in northern Israel
      - 982nd Infantry Battalion
      - 9214th Infantry Battalion
      - 9239th Infantry Battalion
      - 9311th Infantry Battalion
    - 6050th Infantry Brigade "Daniel" (Reserve), in southern Israel
      - 419th Infantry Battalion
      - 5032nd Infantry Battalion
      - 5704th Infantry Battalion
      - 7109th Infantry Battalion
    - 6070th Infantry Brigade "Shiloh" (Reserve), in central Israel
      - 8553rd Infantry Battalion "Magen Shaul"
      - Infantry Battalion "Atzmon"
      - Infantry Battalion
      - Infantry Battalion
    - 4096th Mobility Unit "Har Zion" (Reserve; Ya'ara Division combat drivers)
  - Alon Headquarters (Reserve) (Crisis Management Center)
  - 456th Signal Battalion
  - 6804th Engineer Battalion (Reserve)
  - National Search & Rescue Unit (Reserve)
  - Home Front Command Intelligence Unit
  - Home Front Command Military Police Unit
  - Home Front Command Medical Unit

== Notable operations ==
=== Albanian earthquake relief assistance ===
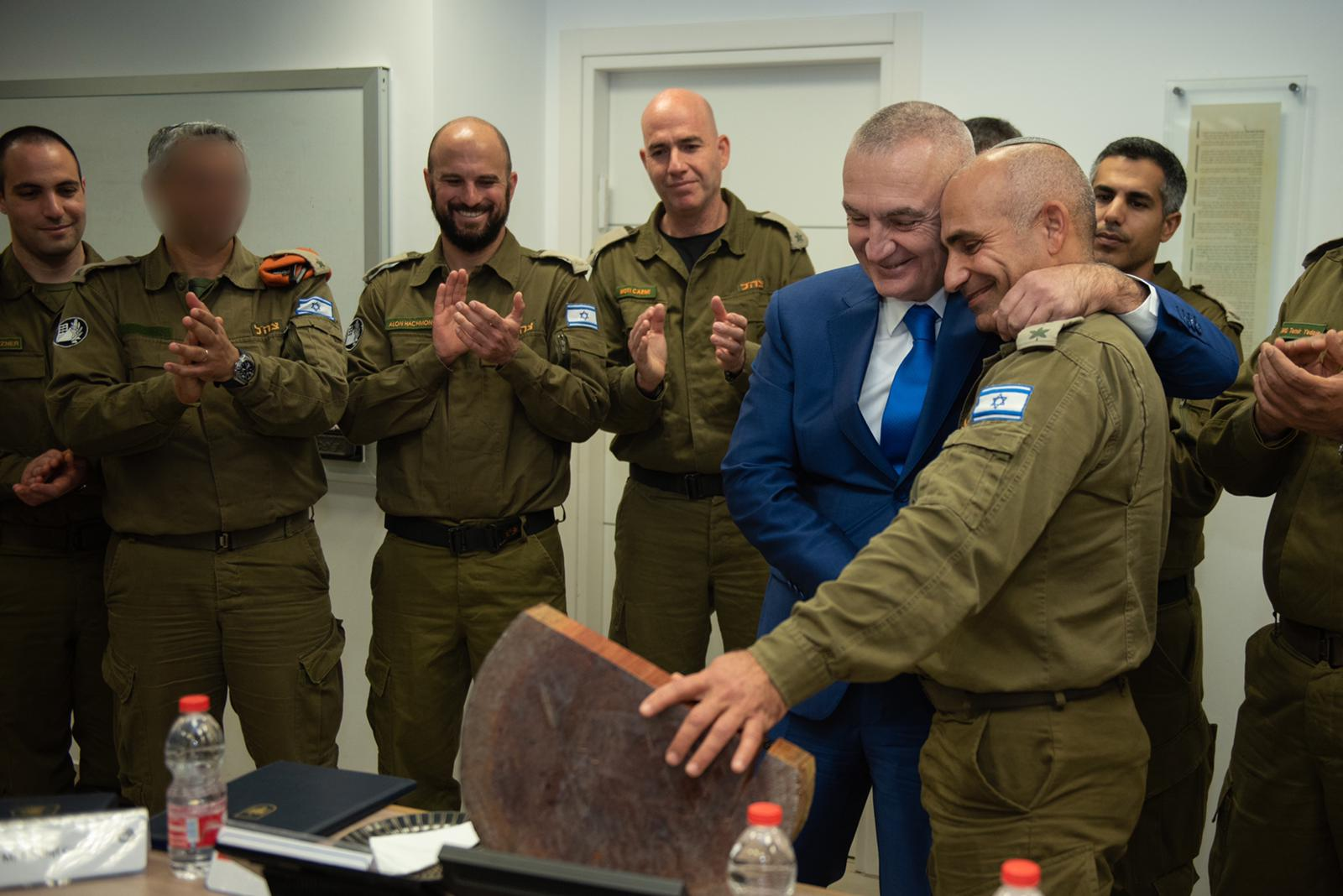
Albanian President Ilir Meta thanking Home Front Command soldiers for their earthquake relief assistance (2020)

On 26 November 2019, an earthquake struck the Durrës region of Albania, killing 51 people, injuring 3,000 others, and damaging 11,000 buildings. Israel sent Home Front Command military engineer troops and a rescue and service team from the regional council of Mevo'ot HaHermon to Albania to search through the rubble for survivors and rescue them, assess whether buildings were structurally sound, and provide Albanians who had been evacuated from their homes with waterproof tents to shelter them.

Israeli Foreign Minister Israel Katz wrote: "We stand with our Albanian friends during this difficult time, and will continue to assist them in any way we can." In January 2020, Albanian President Ilir Meta met with IDF soldiers during an official visit in Israel, embraced them, and thanked them for their assistance in earthquake relief efforts and "further consolidating the friendly and historical relations between our two nations and our countries." At Ramla military base, Meta awarded the Albanian Golden Medal of the Eagle to the National Rescue Unit of the IDF.

=== Response to Surfside, Florida, condominium collapse ===
On 24 June 2021, Israeli Consul-General Maor Elbaz-Starinsky conveyed an official offer from the Israeli government to send the Home Front Command search and rescue team to Florida to assist in rescue efforts associated with the Surfside condominium collapse. Florida responded the next day, and Home Front Command joined the search for survivors. The members of the Home Front Command's National Rescue Unit who assisted with the rescue efforts ultimately recovered 81 of the 97 victims.

=== 2023 Turkey–Syria earthquakes humanitarian aid ===
After the 2023 Turkey–Syria earthquakes, on 6 February 2023, the IDF sent to Turkey a delegation of 150 active duty and reservist personnel of the Home Front Command, as well as members of the Israel Fire and Rescue Services, IDF Medical Corps and more, led by Colonel (Aluf-Mishne) Golan Vach. By 11 February, the delegation had rescued 19 living civilians, including a nine-year-old child.

=== 2023-Present Middle East Crisis ===
Following the Hamas led attack on Israel on October 7th and the subsequent Middle East crisis, the Home Front Command has been in charge of organizing emergency alerts for over 37,000 (Note: As of Sept 2025) missiles and drones launched at Israel. It reportedly refined its geographic targeting technology to allow it to alert Israeli residents more precisely of danger in their area as the war progressed. It ran search and rescue missions during the Iran–Israel war.

== Commanders ==
- Za'av Livne (1992–1994)
- Shmoel Ered (1994–1997)
- Gabi Ofir (1997–2001)
- Yusef Mishleb (2001–2003)
- Yair Nave (2003–2005)
- Yitzhak Gershon (2005–2008)
- Yair Golan (2008–2011)
- Eyal Eizenberg (2011–2015)
- Yoel Strick (2015–2017)
- Tamir Yadai (2017–2020)
- Ori Gordin (2020–2022)
- Rafi Milo (2022–2025)
- Shai Klapper (2025–)

== See also ==
- Israel Defense Forces
