= Paran Brigade =

512th Paran Brigade
- חטיבת פארן
- Active: 28 November 2018 – Present
- Country: Israel
- Type: Infantry
- Role: Border Security
- Part of: 80th Division
- Garrison/HQ: Ketziot, Israel

Commanders
- Current commander: Col. Shemer Raviv

The 512th "Paran" Brigade is an Israeli regular infantry regional brigade that is subordinated to the 80th Division and traditionally associated with the Southern Command. The Paran Brigade was established through a reconfiguration of the Sagi Brigade.

The brigade headquarters are at Ketziot.

== Brigade Commanders ==
Name	Duration	Note
Eli Yitzhak Ben Bashat	28th November 2018 - 18th August 2020	Founder of the Brigade and its first commander. Was killed in the Gaza war.
Elad Shushan	18th August 2020 - 2nd January 2022
Ido Sa'ad	2nd January 2022 - 29th July 2023	Dismissed due to an attack on the Egyption border.
Shemer Raviv	29th July 2023	Current brigade commander

== Structure ==
The Paran Brigade incorporates and consolidates in a single formation the mixed (male and female) Caracal, the Lions of Jordan, the Cheetah, and Bardalas battalions, already serving within the 80th Division.

The Paran Brigade is unique to the rest of the IDF divisions as a regional and regular brigade.

== Mission ==
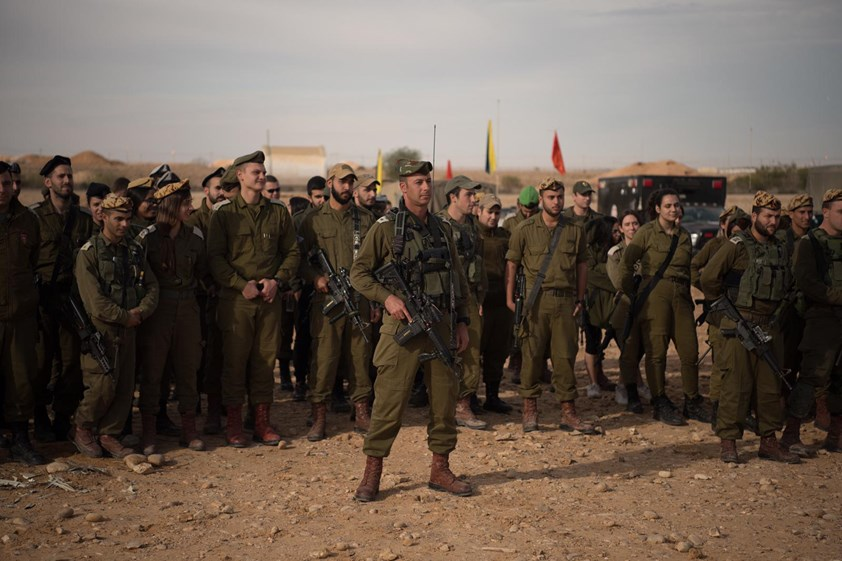
Paran Brigade members

The mission of the Paran Brigade is twofold: border surveillance and defense, and internal training of the troops assigned. The protection of the Israeli-Egyptian border is from Eliat to Holot Halutza with Egypt’s Sinai, and, according to Andrea Spada, particularly the area extending from the Nitsana border.

== Distinctive insignia ==
The soldiers in the brigade will have the speckled, yellow, green and brown berets of the Border Defense Force and wear red boots and a newly designed tag on their shoulders.
