= Yitzhak Hofi =

Israeli general (1927–2014)

- יצחק חופי
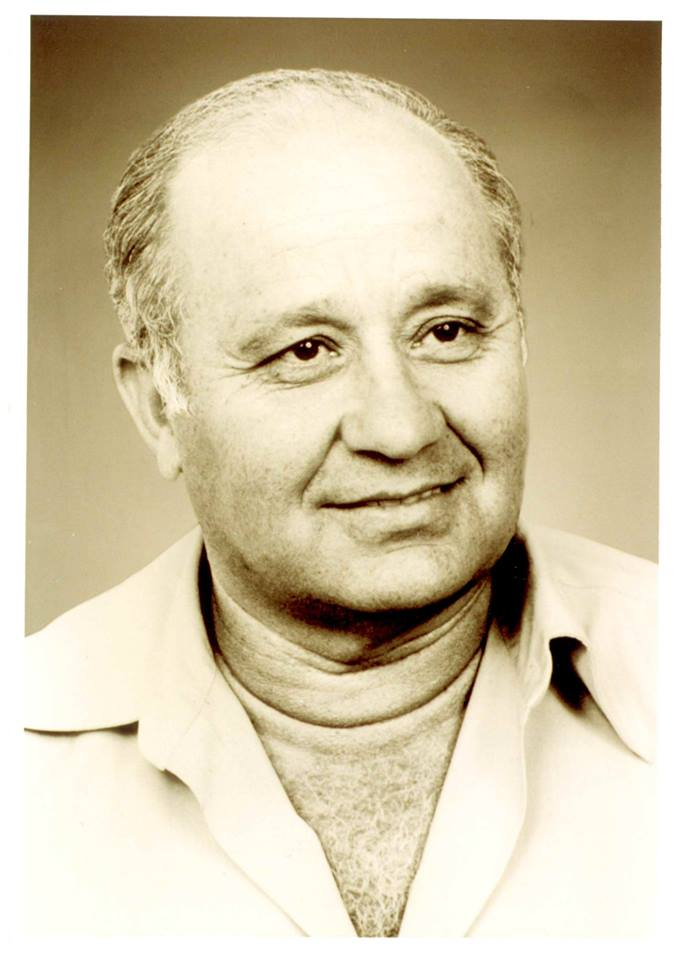
- Born: 25 January 1927; Tel Aviv, Mandatory Palestine
- Died: 15 September 2014 (aged 87); Ramat Gan, Israel
- Occupation: Director of Mossad
- Espionage activity
- Allegiance: State of Israel
- Service branch: Haganah, Palmach, Israel Defense Forces, Mossad
- Service years: 1944–1948 (Haganah and Palmach); 1948–1974 (IDF); 1974–1982 (Mossad)
- Rank: Aluf

Yitzhak Hofi (Hebrew: יצחק חופי; 25 January 1927 – 15 September 2014) was a member of the Palmach, IDF General, chief of the Northern Command (Israel), and director of the Mossad.

== Life ==
Hofi was born in Tel Aviv to parents who had made aliyah from Odessa five years prior. He joined the Haganah in 1944 and commanded a company in the Arab-Israeli War in 1948. He continued to serve in the Israeli Defense Forces in a variety of command, staff and training posts. He headed the Northern Command of the IDF during the Yom Kippur War in 1973. He was Acting Chief of Staff for a brief period in 1974, before retiring from the military and taking the post of director of Mossad. Before that he was a general in the Israel Defense Forces in charge of the Northern Command.

In July 1976, Hofi lobbied strongly for a rescue mission to be mounted to save the large number of Israeli passengers on a hijacked Air France airliner flown to Entebbe International Airport in Uganda. In order to facilitate the resulting Operation Entebbe, Hofi directed Mossad katsas to survey the airport, and used contacts in Kenyan intelligence to allow the refueling of Israeli planes in Nairobi on the return journey.

During his tenure as Director of the Mossad, Israel carried out Operation Opera, a surprise Israeli attack on Iraq's nuclear reactor in Osirak. In addition, the Mossad under his command assassinated a number of Palestinian terrorists, including Ali Hassan Salameh, chief of operations for the Black September Organization.

After retiring from the Mossad in 1982, Hofi served as director of the Israel Electric Corporation until 1990.

He died on 15 September 2014.
