= Udi Adam =

Israeli general

Ehud Adam
- אהוד אדם
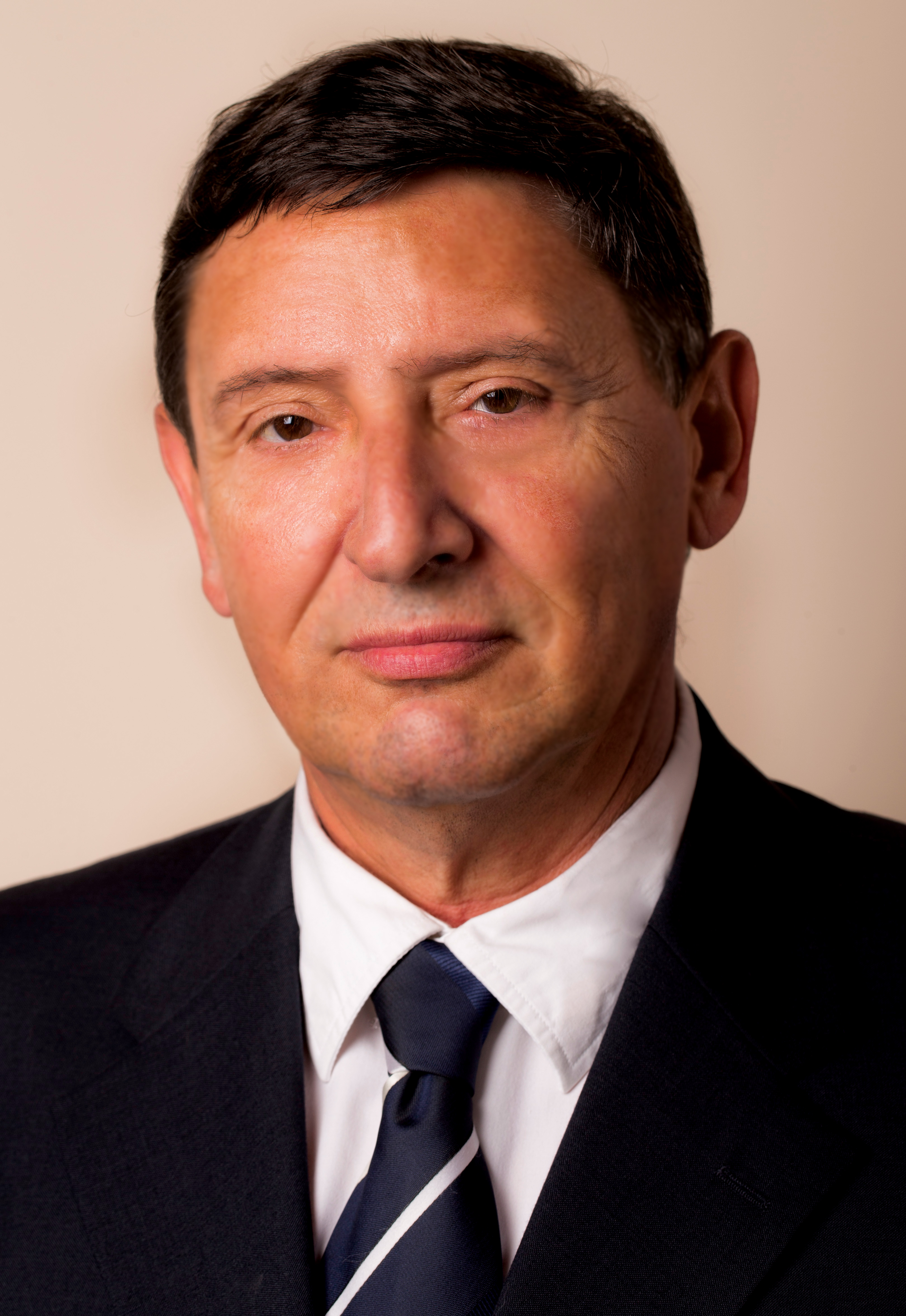
- Born: 22 January 1958 (age 68); Tel Aviv, Israel
- Education: Bar-Ilan University; École supérieure de guerre
- Relatives: Yekutiel Adam (father)
- Military career
- Allegiance: Israel
- Branch: Northern Command
- Service years: 1976–2006
- Rank: Aluf
- Nickname: Udi
- Unit: Armored Corps
- Commands: 500 Brigade, 460 Brigade, Elram, Northern Command
- Conflicts: 1982 Lebanon War, 2006 Lebanon War

Aluf Ehud "Udi" Adam (Hebrew: אהוד "אודי" אדם; born 22 January 1958) is a former general in the Israel Defense Forces and the former head of the Israeli Northern Command.

== Biography ==
Adam was born in Tel Aviv to a Mountain Jewish family. His father was General Yekutiel Adam, former Deputy Chief of Staff of the Israel Defense Forces (IDF), who was killed during the Lebanon War on June 10, 1982. His great-grandfather, Yekutiel Ravayev, was killed in combat defending Petah Tikva in 1916. Adam graduated from Herzliya Hebrew High School, and was conscripted into the IDF in 1976.

Adam began his military service with the Israeli Armored Corps. Before becoming the Aluf in charge of the Northern Command in 2005, he was the Director of the Israeli Technological and Logistics Directorate. As head of the Northern Command, Adam led and coordinated Israeli forces against Hezbollah during the 2006 Israel-Lebanon conflict. On August 8, 2006, IDF Deputy Chief of Staff Moshe Kaplinsky was surprisingly appointed to the Northern Command as a special representative of the Chief of Staff in response to criticism by the government over the Command's handling of the conflict. Adam announced his resignation on September 13, amid continuing criticism of the war's conduct.

Adam has a BA in psychology and sociology from Bar-Ilan University, and an MA in strategic studies from the École Militaire staff college in Paris. He lives in Yavne, and is married with three children.

Adam served as Director General of the Israeli Ministry of Defense between May 2016 and May 2020.
