= Operation Northern Shield =

2018–2019 Israeli military operation

- Part of the Iran–Israel proxy conflict and the Hezbollah–Israel conflict
- Type: Military operation
- Location: Northern District, Israel
- Planned by: Israel Defense Forces
- Target: Hezbollah tunnels
- Date: 4 December 2018 – 13 January 2019 (1 month, 1 week and 2 days)
- Executed by: IDF Northern Command; IDF Combat Engineering Corps; IDF Military Intelligence Directorate
- Outcome

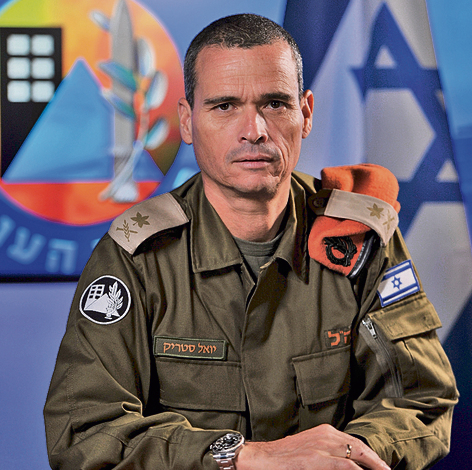
Maj. Gen. Yoel Strick, commander of the Northern Command of the IDF

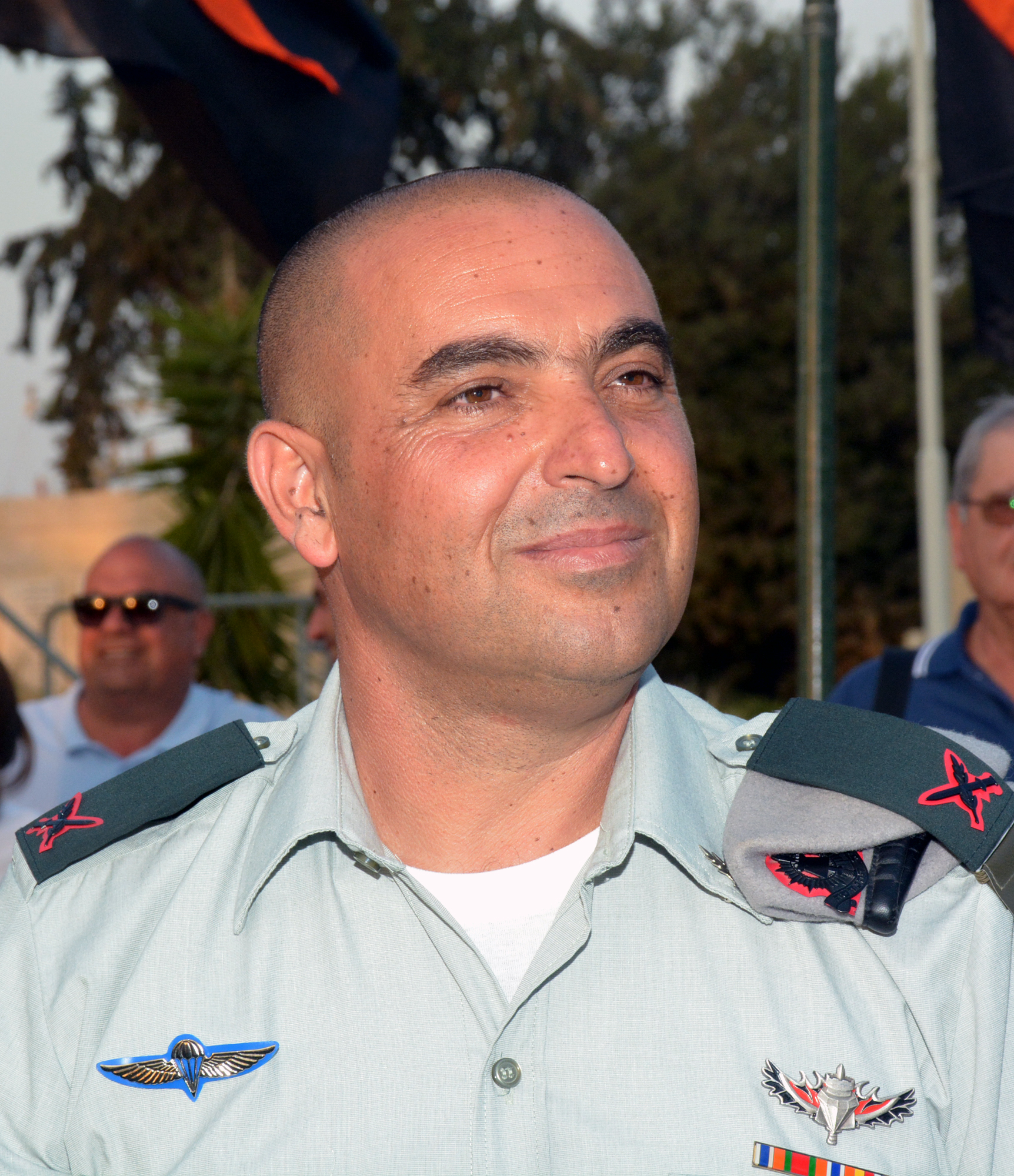
Brig. Gen. Ilan Sabag, commander of the Combat Engineering Corps of the IDF

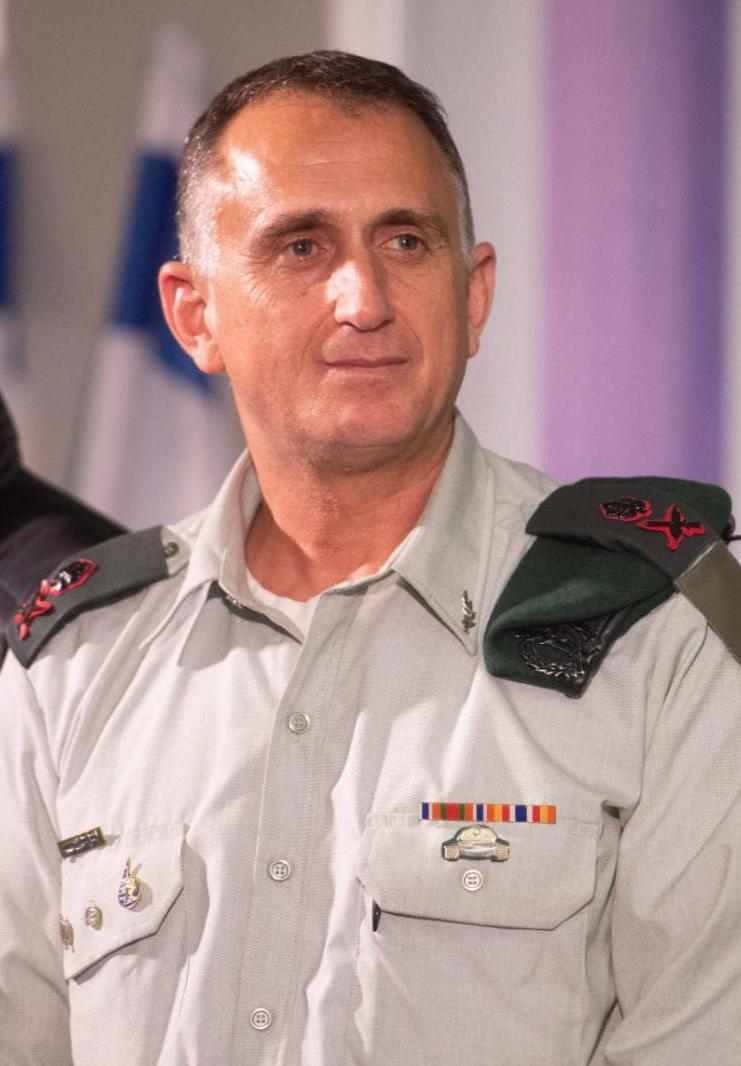
Maj. Gen. Tamir Hayman, commander of the Military Intelligence Directorate of the IDF

Operation Northern Shield (Hebrew: מבצע מגן צפוני, romanized: Mivtza Magen Tzfoni) was an Israeli military operation that took place from 4 December 2018 until 13 January 2019. The operation's declared goal was to locate and destroy Hezbollah tunnels that cross the Blue Line from Lebanon into northern Israel. According to Israel, this operation is part of the ongoing Iran–Israel proxy conflict. On 17 December 2018, United Nations Interim Force in Lebanon (UNIFIL) acknowledged the existence of four tunnels near the Israel–Lebanon border and confirmed that two of them cross the Blue Line in violation of United Nations Security Council Resolution 1701, which helped to end the 2006 Lebanon War.

== Background ==
The Israel Defense Forces (IDF) started searching for Hezbollah tunnels into Israel in 2013 after residents of northern Israel reported hearing sounds of digging, but failed to find anything. After the 2014 Gaza War, which saw numerous tunnels dug by Hamas from the Gaza Strip into Israel being uncovered and being utilized in several attacks, the IDF renewed its search for Hezbollah tunnels in northern Israel, and this time found indications that such tunnels existed. A laboratory made up of soldiers from technology and intelligence units was formed to investigate it, based on a similar laboratory investigating Hamas tunnels in southern Israel. A variety of seismic sensors and radar systems were used to locate the tunnels.

The operation was planned two and a half years in advance. After realizing that Hezbollah's tunnels would need to be dealt with in 2015, a team of IDF military engineers, intelligence officers, and technology experts determined that plans should be made for destroying the tunnels. Preparations were made in secrecy, with many participants told they were participating in routine training. Senior officers in the IDF Combat Engineering Corps realized that the hard, rocky terrain of northern Israel, as opposed to the soft, sandy terrain of the area where Hamas tunnels were dug in the south, would pose a challenge that the IDF was not accustomed to. In 2017, it was decided to send 11 Engineering Corps personnel to Europe to learn about hard-rock excavation.

According to a senior Israeli official, the operation was launched in December 2018 due to fears that the details of the planned operation would be leaked. It was feared that Hezbollah might attempt to utilize them and launch a kidnapping operation if it discovered that Israel knew about the tunnels.

== Events ==
For the operation, the IDF deployed 11 combat engineering units, including the Yahalom special unit, bulldozers and other heavy equipment.

During the first day of the operation, on 4 December, the IDF said it had uncovered a tunnel near the Israeli town of Metula with an estimated length of 200 metres (220 yd) that "extended more than 40 yards (37 m)" into Israel. The Washington Post reported that this tunnel was likely monitored for several years by Israel. While uncovering the first tunnel, the IDF placed a camera inside the tunnel and caught on video two suspected Hezbollah members inside, one of whom was identified by Israel as Dr. Imad "Azaladin" Fahs, who is reportedly known as a "commander for the Hezbollah observation unit on the border with Israel and a commander in the tunnel unit." Hezbollah claimed that the man spotted in the tunnel is a drug smuggler, and is not among its ranks.

On 6 December 2018, UNIFIL confirmed the existence of the first cross-border tunnel. On the same day, the IDF said it discovered a second tunnel originating from the village of Ramyah near the border, and demanded that UNIFIL reach the tunnel from the Lebanese side and said that "whoever enters the underground perimeter endangers his life".

Also on that day, Israel demanded that Lebanon and UNIFIL destroy the tunnels, saying that it "holds the Lebanese government, the Lebanese Armed Forces and United Nations Interim Force in Lebanon responsible for all events transpiring in and emanating from Lebanon". UNIFIL said that it was "engaged with the parties to pursue urgent follow-up action". According to Al-Manar, the Lebanese Foreign Minister, Gebran Bassil instructed the Lebanese UN envoy to say that Israel is conducting "a diplomatic and political campaign against Lebanon in preparation for attacks against it." As of 8 December 2018, Lebanon has not responded publicly to the Israeli demand, with Lebanese sources telling Asharq Al-Awsat that "all concerned official parties were following up on the issue and they are exerting efforts to address it away from the media or political spotlight" and that Lebanon is working on a UN complaint asserting that Israel's "diplomatic and political campaign against Lebanon that are a precursor to waging attacks against it."

On 11 December 2018, the IDF said it located a third tunnel crossing into Israel. On the same day, UNIFIL confirmed the existence of the second cross-border tunnel.

On 16 December 2018, the IDF said it located a fourth tunnel crossing into Israel, and that as the tunnel had been rigged with explosives anyone entering it from the Lebanese side would be risking their life.

On 17 December 2018, IDF troops placed rolls of concertina wire on the Israeli side of the Blue Line. During placement of the wire, a non-violent confrontation took place between Israeli and Lebanese soldiers. Also on 17 December 2018, UNIFIL acknowledged the existence of four tunnels near the Israel–Lebanon border, and said "UNIFIL at this stage can confirm that two of the tunnels cross the Blue Line" in violations of United Nations Security Council Resolution 1701.

On 19 December 2018, in a special session of the United Nations Security Council, Israel urged the UNSC to condemn Hezbollah and designate it as a terrorist organization. Israel also accused Hezbollah of storing weapons in private homes. Jean-Pierre Lacroix, the UN peacekeeping chief, said UNIFIL confirmed four tunnels including two that cross into Israel, a "serious violation" of the 2006 ceasefire resolution (1701). The Lebanese ambassador Amal Mudallali, said that Lebanon takes the matter seriously and remains committed to resolution 1701. However, Mudallali also accused Israel of repeated airspace violations by the Israeli Air Force. While several countries on the council joined Israel in condemning the tunnels, the council took no action at the end of the session.

On 25 December, the IDF announced that it had found a fifth tunnel several days before, and that it had been neutralized with explosives.

On 13 January 2019, the IDF found a sixth tunnel, which it claimed was the largest and most sophisticated discovered. It had electrical lighting, a rail system for moving equipment, garbage disposal, and stairs. The IDF announced that this was the final tunnel, but that it was monitoring other areas along the border where Hezbollah was digging underground infrastructure that had yet to cross into Israel. With this discovery, the IDF announced the conclusion of Operation Northern Shield.

== Lebanese view ==
According to an anonymous Lebanese security source speaking to the Lebanese newspaper Al Joumhouria, the tunnels were "old and deserted", and were exploited by Israel for political ends. Their source stated that Israel had announced the discovery of the tunnels long ago, but was only now using them for political gain.

Hassan Nasrallah, in response to the operation stated that he was surprised that it took so long for Israelis to find the tunnels, and that the operation was an "intelligence failure."
