= David Ben-Besht =

Israeli general

David Ben Besht
- דוד בן בעש"ט
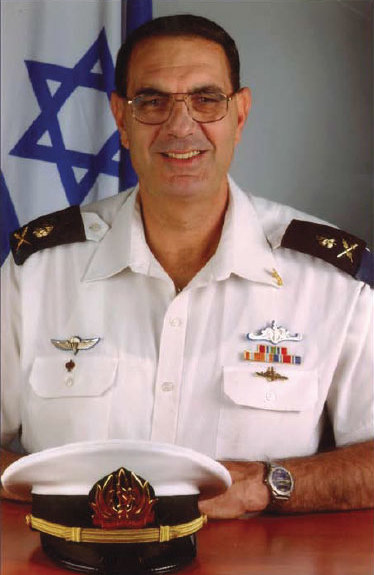
- Born: 1950 (age 75–76)
- Military career
- Allegiance: Israel
- Branch: Israeli Navy
- Service years: 1970—2007
- Rank: Aluf
- Conflicts: Yom Kippur War, First Lebanon War, Second Lebanon War

David Ben-Besht (Hebrew: דוד בן בעש"ט; born 1950) is a general in the Israel Defense Forces. Until 2007 he was commander of the Israeli Navy.

== Biography ==
David Ben-Besht was born in Israel. He received a BA in Economics and an MBA in Business Administration and Management from the University of Haifa and studied at the United States Marine Corps College for a year in the early 1970s.

== Naval career ==
Ben-Besht began his military career as a draftee in 1970 but then volunteered to attend the naval officer's course. Through the 1970s he commanded a number of vessels including a Saar 2 and a Saar 4 missile boat. During the 1980s he moved into the area naval instructional, and from there he continued to advance up the chain of command, becoming the Israeli Navy's Chief of Staff in 2002 and commander in September 2004.

As Naval Commander, Ben-Besht dealt with Palestinian arms smugglers moving equipment by boat from Egypt into the Gaza Strip.
