= Bar'am Brigade =

300th "Bar'am" Brigade
- חטיבת הגפן
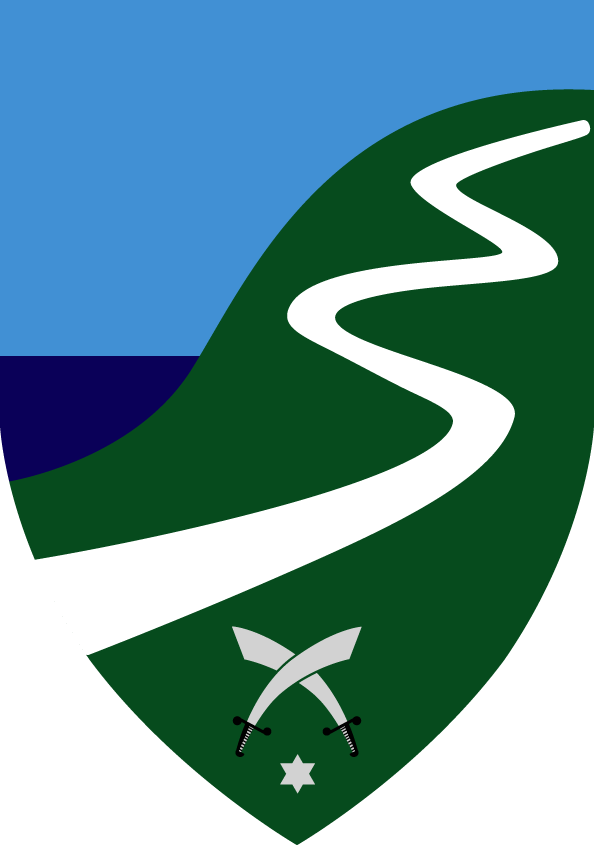
- Brigade patch
- Active: 1974–present
- Country: Israel
- Branch: Israel Defense Forces: Israeli Ground Forces
- Type: Infantry
- Part of: 91st Division, Israeli Northern Command
- Mascot: Fox
- Engagements: Israeli-Lebanese conflict: Operation Litani; 1982 Lebanon War; 2006 Lebanon War; 2023 Israel-Hezbollah conflict; 2024 Lebanon War; 2026 Lebanon War

Commanders
- Current commander: Colonel Aviran Alfasi
- Notable commanders: #Commanders

The 300th Bar'am Brigade (Hebrew: עוצבת ברעם), is a brigade belonging to the 91st Division of the Israeli Ground Forces, it was established in 1974, following the Yom Kippur War and is entrusted with the security of the western section of the Israel-Lebanon border between Malkia and Rosh HaNikra, and is headquartered at Shomera.

== History ==
Until shortly after the Yom Kippur War, the Meron District Guard was responsible for guarding the Israel-Lebanon border from Mount Hermon to Rosh Hanikra, but following the Yom Kippur war and the intensification of militant activity at the border, the Lebanese border sector was divided into two brigade sectors: the Meron District became the 769th Regional Brigade responsible for the eastern sector, while in the sector from Moshav Avivim to Rosh Hanikra, a new brigade called the Birnit Brigade was established in June 1974, headed by Colonel Eliezer Ram, who was the commander of the Golani Brigade at the end of the Yom Kippur War.

In May 1974, Col. Binyamin Ben-Eliezer was appointed to the command of Unit 300, which included the Harb Battalion and the 244th Reconnaissance Company, it was responsible for the defending the coastal sector between Haifa and Rosh Hanikra. The unit's headquarters was located in the 'Shraga' camp. In December 1974, the General Staff decided to establish the 300th Brigade by merging the Birnit Brigade with Unit 300, a task assigned to Colonel Ben Eliezer and his deputy Gedaliah Ben Dor.

In 1975–1976, the 300th brigade was established on the basis of 300th Battalion, 244th Battalion, and three Druze reserve battalions. Other reserve battalions and artillery units also served in the brigade's sector. Until Operation Litani, the brigade was engaged mostly against militant infiltration attempts from Lebanon, establishing the electronic warning fence and forming ties with and training the Christian militias in southern Lebanon, under "Good Fence". Lt. Col. Saeed Abd al-Haq, first Druze officer in IDF to be promoted to the rank of colonel, assisted the brigade commander in establishing the Druze reserve battalions.

Colonel Ben-Eliezer was then replaced by Colonel Gideon Hameiri, who commanded the unit in 1976–1977. Then, the unit undertook it's first large scale combat Operation during Operation Litani in 1978, and after the occupation of southern Lebanon, it was responsible for the sector south of Tyre for five months. under the command of Colonel Sheikha Erez, and also provided humanitarian aid.

In January 1982, it was decided that the unit would no longer consist solely of minority soldiers, but would be a regular infantry unit. Then, it took part in the 1982 Lebanon war under Colonel Avi Telem, as part of the 91st Division in the western sector of Lebanon. The brigade participated in the battles for Tyre, Sidon and the Rashidieh refugee camp.

In 2004, Colonel Chen Livni was appointed as it's commander as it frequently engaged in skirmishes at the Lebanon border. It remained responsible for guarding the border sector with Lebanon, even during the 2006 Hezbollah cross-border raid in which Hezbollah kidnapped Israeli soldiers, which the 300th Brigade's commander Chen Livni blamed on faulty intelligence. During the war, the brigade's forces took part in the Battle of Maroun al-Ras.

On 9 October 2023, during the 2023 Israel-Hezbollah conflict, the brigade's deputy commander Alim Abdallah was killed in the Western Galilee during an exchange of fire with militants who infiltrated from Lebanon, two more soldiers (Sgt. Jawad Amer and Master Sgt. Gilad Molcho) were also killed in the attack.

In the prelude to the 2024 Lebanon war, an Israeli-Bedouin soldier of the 300th "Baram' Regional Brigade was killed in a Hezbollah rocket attack on Ya'ara, and another was wounded on 18 August 2024. Major Nael Fwarsy, tye company commander of the brigade's 299th Battalion, was killed in action in the war on 29 September 2024.

It also took part in the 2026 Lebanon war and carried out drone interceptions in the Twelve-Day War. Hasmonean Brigade also partook in combat operations in Lebanon under the 300th. On 18 May 2026, Hezbollah announced that they launched a drone attack on a vehicle belonging to the commander of the 300th "Bar'am" Brigade. As of November 2026, it was operating in Southern Lebanon dismantling hezbollah infrastructure.

== Commanders ==
- Benjamin Ben Eliezer (1974–1976)
- Gideon Meiri (1976–1977)
- Isaiah Erez (1977–1979)
- Avraham Hido (1979–1980)
- Erwin Lavie (1980–1981)
- Avi Telem (1981–1982)
- Ofer Ben Zvi (1982–1984)
- Gabi Ofir (1984–1985)
- Zeev Zakharin (1985–1986)
- Mati Harari (1986–1988)
- Udi Shlovi (1988–1989)
- Shuki Shirukh (1989–1991)
- Yehiel Gozal (1991–1993)
- Ilan Harari (1993–1995)
- Zion Gazit (1995–1996)
- Nimrod Ran (1996–1998)
- Alon Friedman (1998–2000)
- Dror Rofa (2000–2002)
- Tamir Yadai (2002–2004)
- Chen Livni (2004–2006)
- Ofek Buchris (2006–2008)
- Ronen Marley (2008–2010)
- Rafi Milo (2010–2012)
- Eliad Maoti (2016–2018)
- Omer Cohen (August 2020–July 2022)
- Uri Dauba (July 2022–September 2024)
- Omri Rosenkrantz (September 2024–May 2026)
- Aviran Alfasi (May 2026–present)

== Structure ==
- 299th Infantry Battalion
- 7112th Infantry Battalion
- 9300th Infantry Battalion
- 300th Special Troops Battalion
- 300th Signal Company "Palhik"
