= 80th Division (Israel) =

80th Division "Edom"
- Division symbol
- Active: 1979–present
- Country: Israel
- Branch: Israeli Ground Forces
- Type: Reserve territorial infantry
- Size: Division
- Part of: Southern Command
- Nickname: Edom אדום

Commanders
- Current commander: Itamar ben haim
- Notable commanders: Yoel Strick

The 80th Division "Edom" is a territorial division of the Israel Defense Forces' Southern Command.

== History ==
The unit was established in 1979. In February 2007 a regional division, Sagi Brigade, was established. In June 2011, an additional regional division, Arava Brigade, was established. It was closed in June 2016.

In December 2012, the Eilat Brigade was renamed into the Yoav Brigade. The new unit was tasked with protecting the Red Sea city of Eilat. In November 2018, Paran Brigade replaced the Sagi Brigade, taking on its responsibilities as well as others.

== Division organization ==
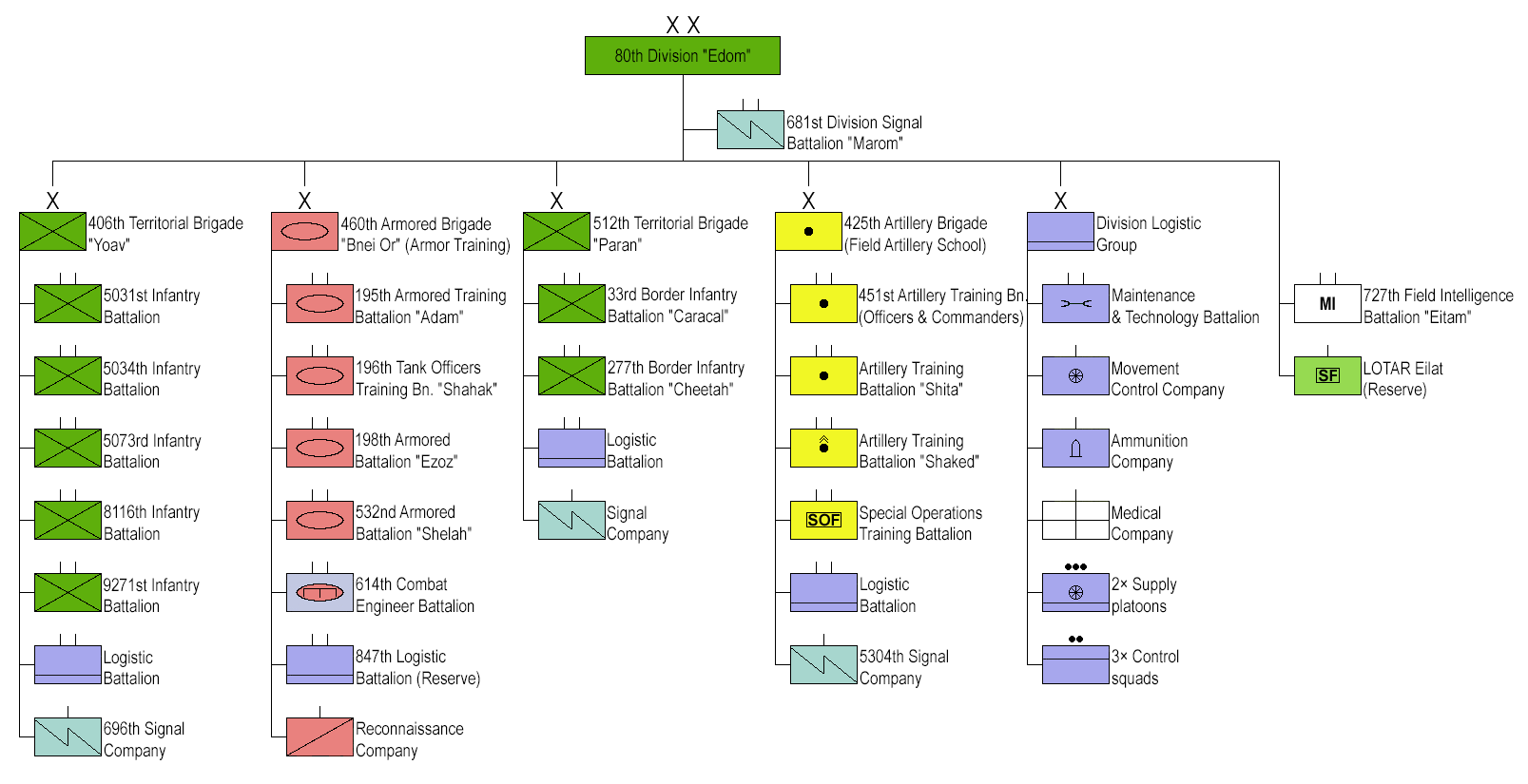
80th Division "Edom" organization as of November 2026

- 80th Division "Edom"
  - 189th Infantry Brigade "Negba" (Reserve) — defence of Beersheba, the northern Negev and Israel's South
    - 1891st Infantry Battalion "Yoav Defenders" — Beersheba and the communities of the northern Negev
    - 1892nd Infantry Battalion "Horav" — communities surrounding the Gaza Strip
    - 1893rd Infantry Battalion "Mount Negev" — Dimona, Yeruham, Ramat Negev, Mitzpe Ramon, and surrounding communities
    - 1894th Infantry Battalion "Hillel" — Israeli Navy veterans; defence of the communities of HaNahalim and Arabah
    - 1895th Infantry Battalion "Yale" — Eilat and the communities of the Hevel Eilot Regional Council
  - 406th Territorial Brigade "Yoav"
    - 5031st Infantry Battalion
    - 5034th Infantry Battalion
    - 5073rd Infantry Battalion
    - 8116th Infantry Battalion
    - 9271st Infantry Battalion
    - Logistic Battalion
    - 696th Signal Company
  - 512th Territorial Brigade "Paran"
    - 33rd Border Guard Battalion "Caracal"
    - 277th Border Guard Battalion "Cheetah"
    - Logistic Battalion
    - Signal Company
  - Division Logistic Group
  - 681st Division Signal Battalion "Marom"
  - 727th Field Intelligence Battalion "Eitam"
  - 8128th Engineer Equipment Unit
  - LOTAR Eilat (Reserve Counterterrorism Unit), in Eilat

== Commanders ==
Name	Tenure	Notes
Yaakov Or	1987–1988	
Moti Paz	1988–1990	
Dov Dekel	1990–1994	
Yusef Mishleb	1994–1995	
Shlomo Oren	1995–2000	
Yishai Beer	2000–2002	
Shmuel Zakai	2002–2004	
Efi Idan	2004–2005	
Imad Fares	2004–2005	
Yoel Starik	2007–2009	
Tamir Yadai	2009–2011	
Nadav Padan	2011–2013	
Roi Elkabetz	September 2013 – 2015	
Rafi Milo	2015–2017	
Guy Hazut	2017–2019	
Gur Shreibman	2019–2021	
Itzik Cohen	2021–	
