= Kfar Yedidia =

Moshav in central Israel

Kfar Yedidia: כְּפָר יְדִידְיָה (Hebrew)
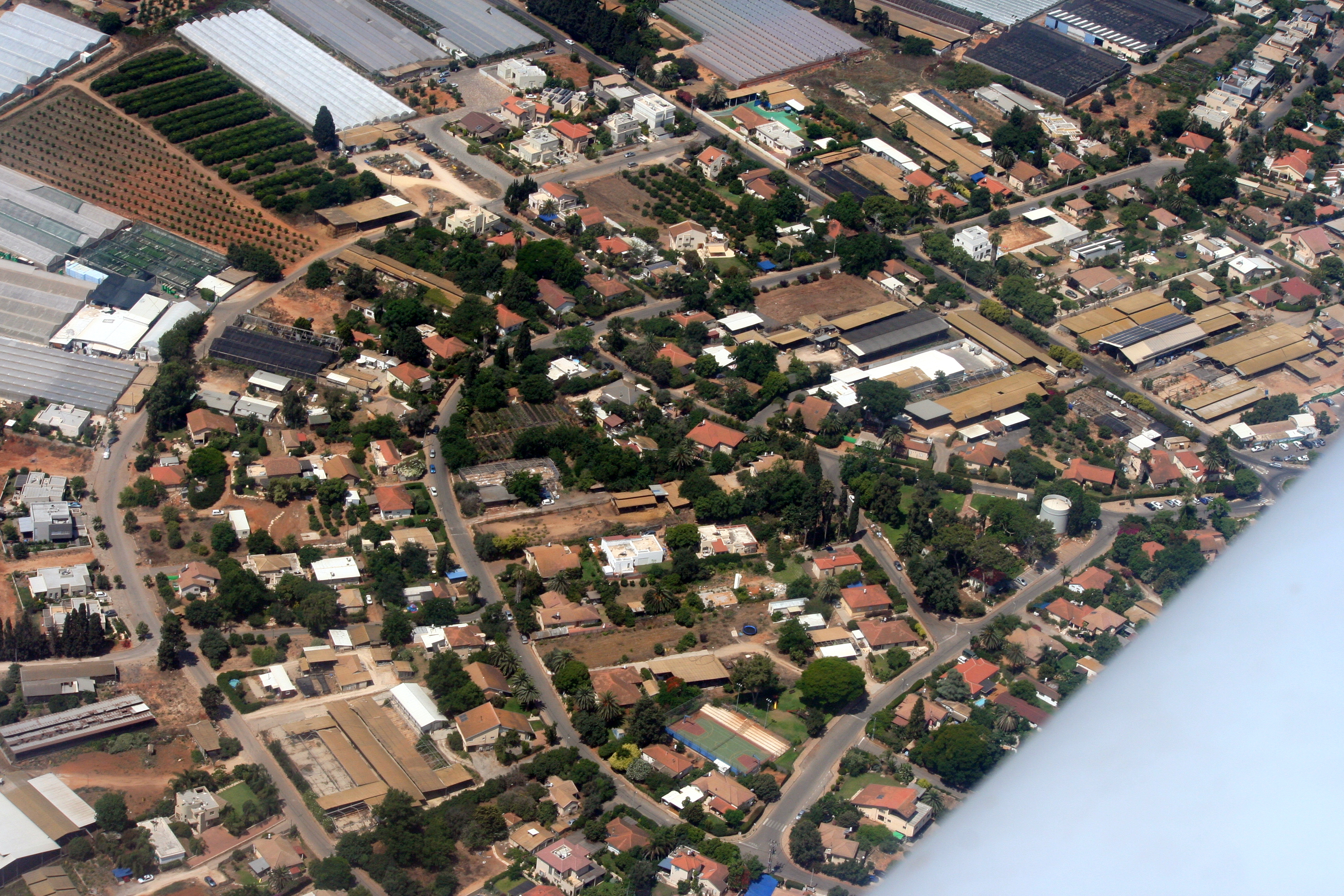
- Etymology: Jedidiah Village
- Location within Central Israel Location within Israel
- Coordinates: 32°20′45″N 34°53′58″E
- Country: Israel
- District: Central
- Subdistrict: HaSharon
- Council: Hefer Valley
- Affiliation: Moshavim Movement
- Founded: 9 April 1935
- Founder: Jewish refugees from Germany
- Population (2024): 809

Kfar Yedidia (Hebrew: כְּפָר יְדִידְיָה, lit. 'Jedidiah Village') is a moshav in central Israel on the coastal plain. With an area of 3,000 dunams, it falls under the jurisdiction of Hefer Valley Regional Council. In 2024 it had a population of 809.

== History ==
Kfar Yedidia was planned by Richard Kauffmann. It was founded on 9 April 1935 by Jewish refugees from Germany. Funding came from Jews in Alexandria, Kingdom of Egypt. The place was named for Philo of Alexandria, known in Hebrew as Yedidia.

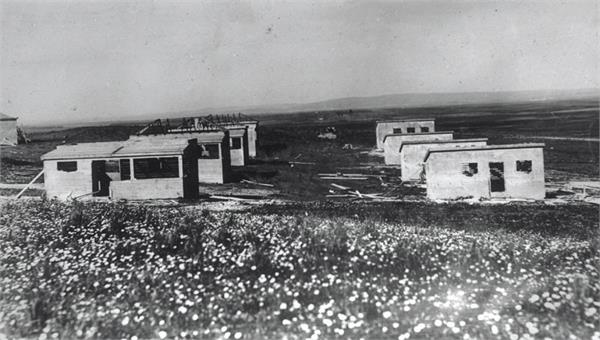
Kfar Yedidia first houses 1935

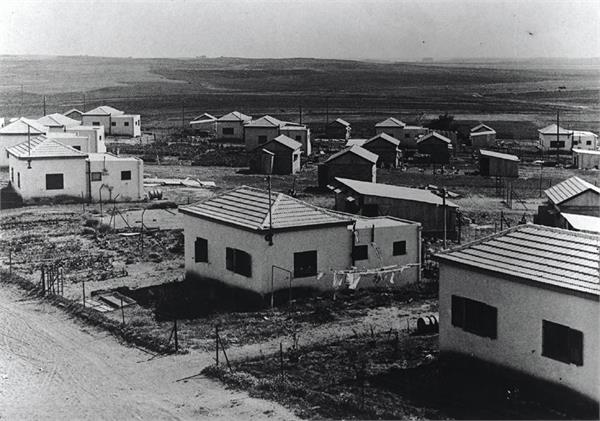
Kfar Yedidia 1937

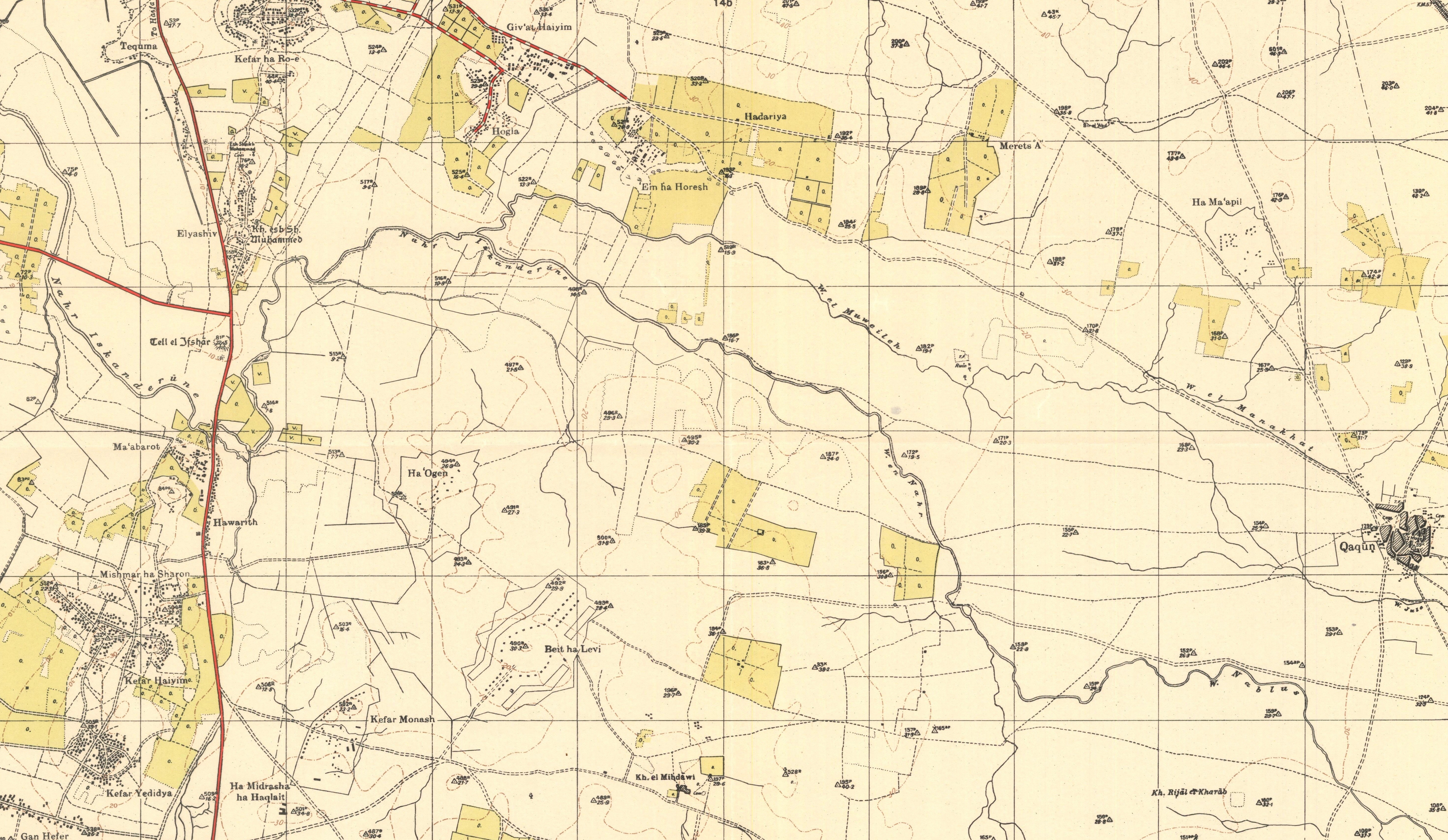
Kfar Yedidia (Kefar Yedidya) 1939 1:20,000

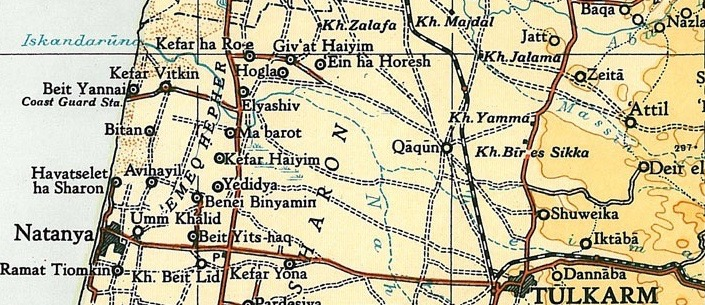
Kfar Yedidia (Yedidya) 1945 1:250,000
