= Northern Command (Israel) =

Regional command of the Israel Defense Forces

- פִּקּוּד צָפוֹן
- Patzan logo, depicting a Persian fallow deer
- Active: 1948–present
- Country: Israel
- Part of: Israel Defense Forces
- Engagements: 1948 Palestine war; Six Day War; Yom Kippur War; 1978 South Lebanon conflict; 1982 Lebanon War; South Lebanon conflict (1985-2000); 2006 Lebanon War; Middle Eastern crisis (2023–present); Gaza war; Hezbollah–Israel conflict (2023–present); 2024 Lebanon war; 2026 Lebanon war; Israeli invasion of Syria (2024–present)

Commanders
- Current commander: Aluf Rafi Milo

Insignia
- Flag

The Northern Command (Hebrew: פִּקּוּד צָפוֹן, Pikud Tzafon, often abbreviated to Patzan) is a regional command in the Israel Defense Forces. The command, whose main headquarters is in Safed, is responsible for all the units located between Hermon and Netanya. The mission of the Northern Command is to protect Israel's northern borders with Syria and Lebanon.

== History ==
During the wars in the 1960s and 70s, the Northern Command was in charge of the campaigns directed against Syria on the Golan Heights and the Lebanese border. During the 1970s and 80s, it mainly faced attacks from the Palestine Liberation Organization (PLO), which was driven to southern Lebanon following Black September. Beginning with the 1982 Lebanon War, the Northern Command faced attacks from Hezbollah, a Lebanese militant group founded in 1982 to fight the Israeli occupation of Southern Lebanon.

In the early 1990s, it may have included a full active armoured division and a mechanised brigade; three to four reserve divisions; four to five reserve mechanised and infantry brigades; and four to five territorial infantry brigades.

During 2000, the Northern Command completed its withdrawal from the Security Zone in southern Lebanon and was dispatched along the UN-sanctioned border. Although Israel's withdrawal from southern Lebanon has been met with UN approval, Hezbollah continues its attacks, mainly in the Shebaa farms area of Mount Hermon, an area occupied by Israel from Syria and which Hezbollah claims as Lebanese territory.

== Command organization ==
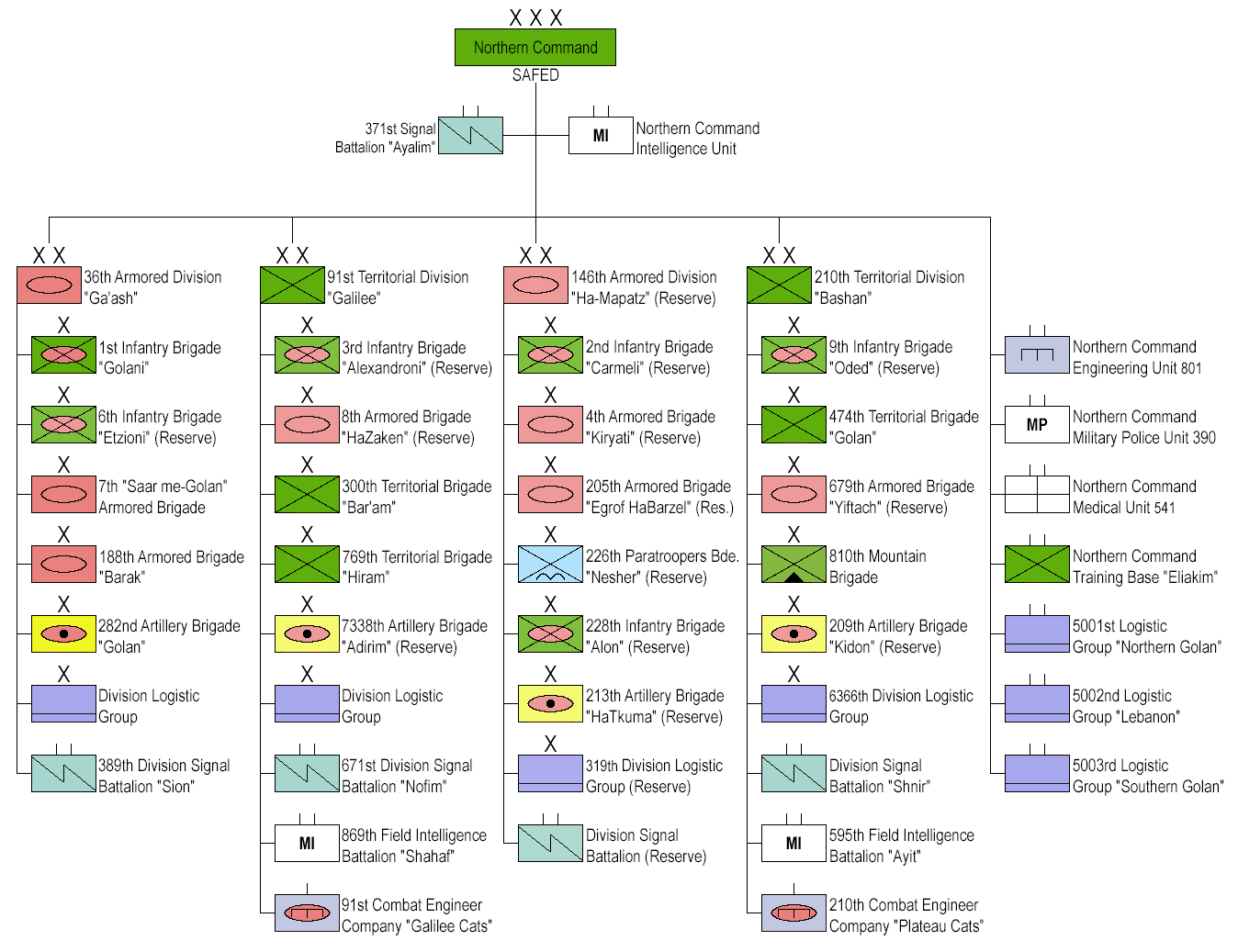
Northern Command organization as of November 2026

The Northern Command commands regional units from Mount Hermon in the Golan Heights, to Netanya, with a significant presence in the Galilee and the Golan Heights.

- Northern Command, in Safed
  - 36th Division "Ga'ash"
    - 1st Infantry Brigade "Golani"
    - 6th Infantry Brigade "Etzioni" (Reserve)
    - 7th Armored Brigade "Saar meGolan"
    - 188th Armored Brigade "Barak"
    - 500th Armored Brigade (Reserve; reactivated 2026)
    - 282nd Artillery Brigade "Golan"
    - Division Logistic Group
  - 91st Division "HaGalil"
    - 3rd Infantry Brigade "Alexandroni" (Reserve)
    - 8th Armored Brigade "HaZaken" (Reserve)
    - 185th Infantry Brigade "Tel Hai" (Reserve)
    - 300th Territorial Brigade "Bar'am" – Western section of the Israel Lebanon border
    - 769th Territorial Brigade "Hiram" – Eastern section of the Israel Lebanon border
    - 7338th Artillery Brigade "Adirim" (Reserve)
    - Division Logistic Group
  - 146th Division "HaMapatz"
    - 2nd Infantry Brigade "Carmeli" (Reserve)
    - 4th Armored Brigade "Kiryati" (Reserve)
    - 205th Armored Brigade "Egrof HaBarzel" (Reserve)
    - 226th Paratroopers Brigade "Nesher" (Reserve)
    - 228th Infantry Brigade "Alon" (Reserve)
    - 213th Artillery Brigade "HaTkuma" (Reserve)
    - 319th Division Logistic Group
  - 210th Division "HaBashan"
    - 9th Infantry Brigade "Oded" (Reserve)
    - 474th Territorial Brigade "Golan" – Golan Heights sector
    - 679th Armored Brigade "Yiftach" (Reserve)
    - 810th Mountain Brigade – Mount Hermon sector
    - 209th Artillery Brigade "Kidon" (Reserve)
    - 6366th Division Logistics Group
  - Northern Command Intelligence Unit
  - Northern Command Training Base "Eliakim"
  - 371st Signal Battalion "Ayalim"
  - 390th Military Police Unit
  - 541st Medical Unit
  - 651st Maintenance Battalion "HaAmakim"
  - 703rd Maintenance Battalion "Golan and Galilee"
  - 801st Combat Engineering Equipment Unit
    - 7064th Combat Engineering Equipment Battalion "Dubei HaTzafon" (Reserve)
  - 7481st Signal Battalion "Sela" (Reserve)
  - 5001st Logistics Group "Northern Golan"
  - 5002nd Logistics Group "Lebanon"
  - 5003rd Logistics Group "Southern Golan"

== Commanders ==
- Moshe Carmel (1948–1949)
- Yosef Avidar (1949–1952)
- Moshe Dayan (1952)
- Asaf Simhoni (1952–1954)
- Moshe Tzadok (1954–1956)
- Yitzhak Rabin (1956–1959)
- Meir Zorea (1959–1962)
- Avraham Yoffe (1962–1964)
- David Elazar (1964–1969)
- Mordechai Gur (1969–1972, 1974)
- Yitzhak Hofi (1972–1974)
- Rafael Eitan (1974–1977)
- Avigdor Ben Gal (1977–1981)
- Amir Drori (1981–1983)
- Ori Orr (1983–1986)
- Yossi Peled (1986–1991)
- Yitzhak Mordechai (1991–1994)
- Amiram Levin (1994–1998)
- Gabi Ashkenazi (1998–2002)
- Benny Gantz (2002–2005)
- Udi Adam (2005–2006)
- Gadi Eizenkot (2006–2011)
- Yair Golan (2011–2014)
- Aviv Kochavi (2014–2017)
- Yoel Strick (2017–2019)
- Amir Baram (2019–2022)
- Ori Gordin (2022–2025)
- Rafi Milo (2025–)

== See also ==
- IDF Code of Ethics
- Yitzhak Rabin
- Safed
- Israel Defense Forces
