= 91st Division (Israel) =

Territorial division in the IDF Northern Command

91st Division "Galilee"
- אוגדה 91
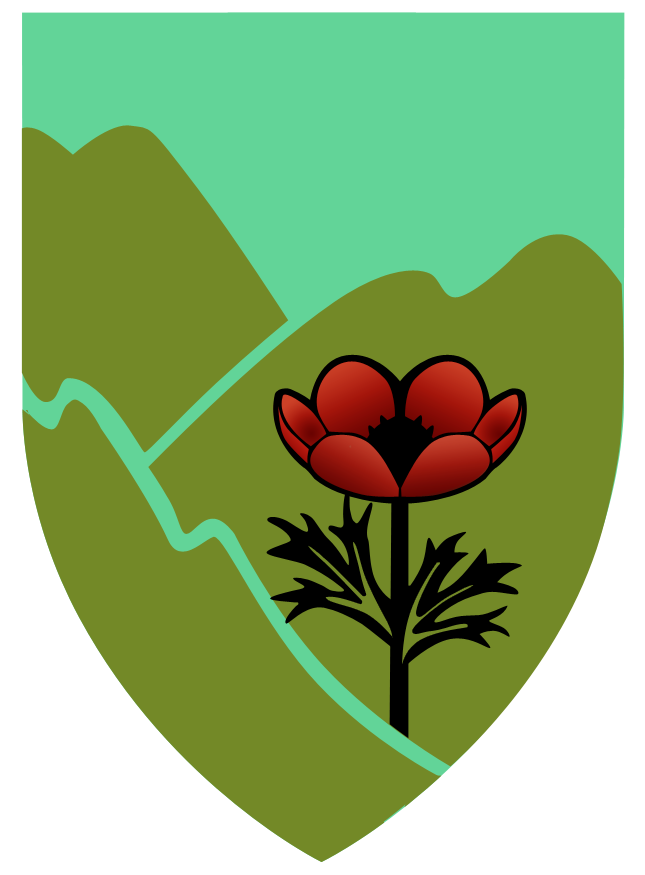
- 91st Division "Galilee" insignia
- Active: 1978 – present
- Country: Israel
- Branch: Israeli Ground Forces
- Type: Combine Arms
- Size: Division
- Part of: Northern Command
- Garrison/HQ: Biranit
- Nickname: Galilee Division
- Engagements: 1982 Lebanon War; 2006 Lebanon war; Gaza war; 2024 Israeli invasion of Lebanon; 2026 Lebanon war

Commanders
- Notable commanders: Herzi Halevi; Yair Golan

The Israel Defense Forces 91st Division "Galilee" (Hebrew: אוגדה 91), known also as the Galilee Formation (Hebrew: עֻצְבַּת הַגָּלִיל, Utzbat HaGalil), is a territorial division in the IDF Northern Command, responsible for the front with Lebanon, from Rosh HaNikra up to, but not including Mount Dov. In May 2025 it resumed responsibility for this entire front, the western portion having previously been covered by the 146th Division.

Its headquarters are located at Biranit, Israel, along with a military police investigations base.

== Division organization ==
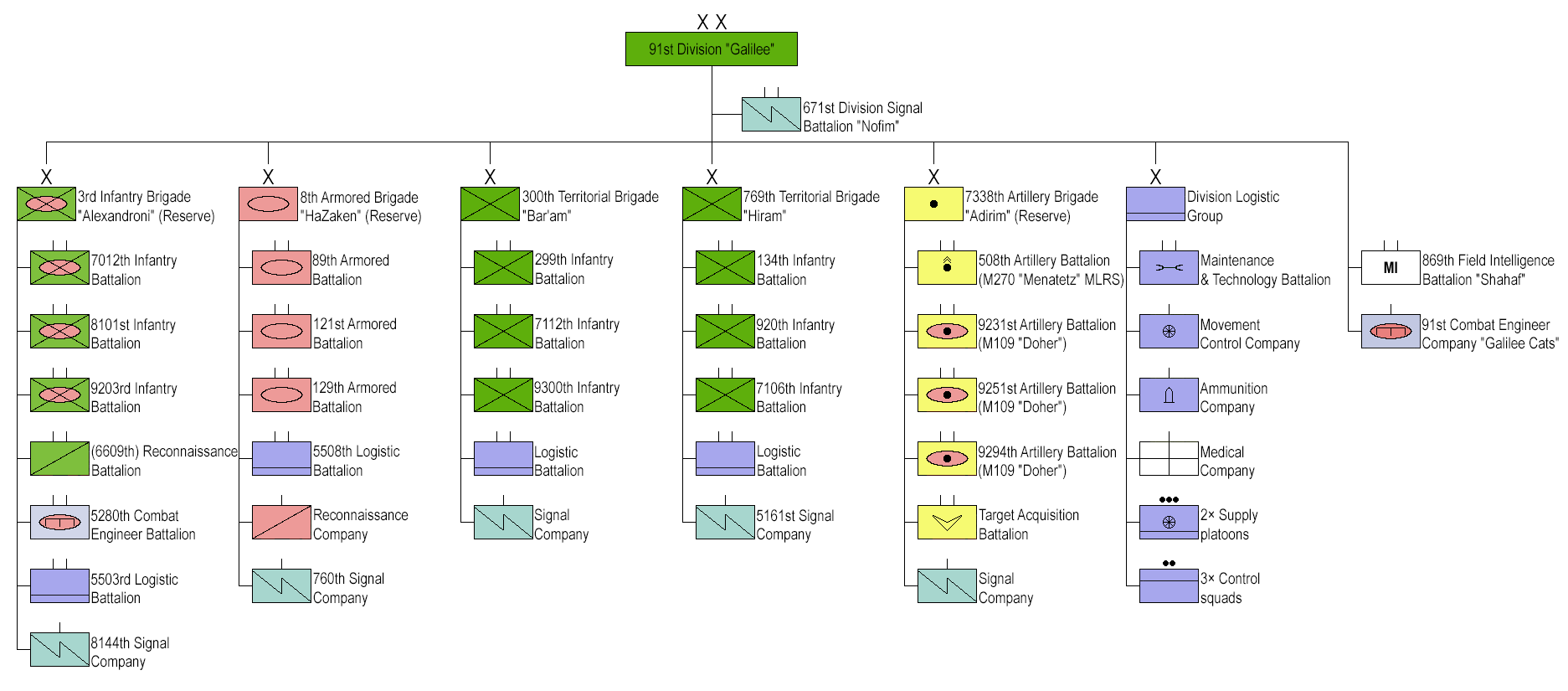
91st Division "Galilee" organization as of November 2026

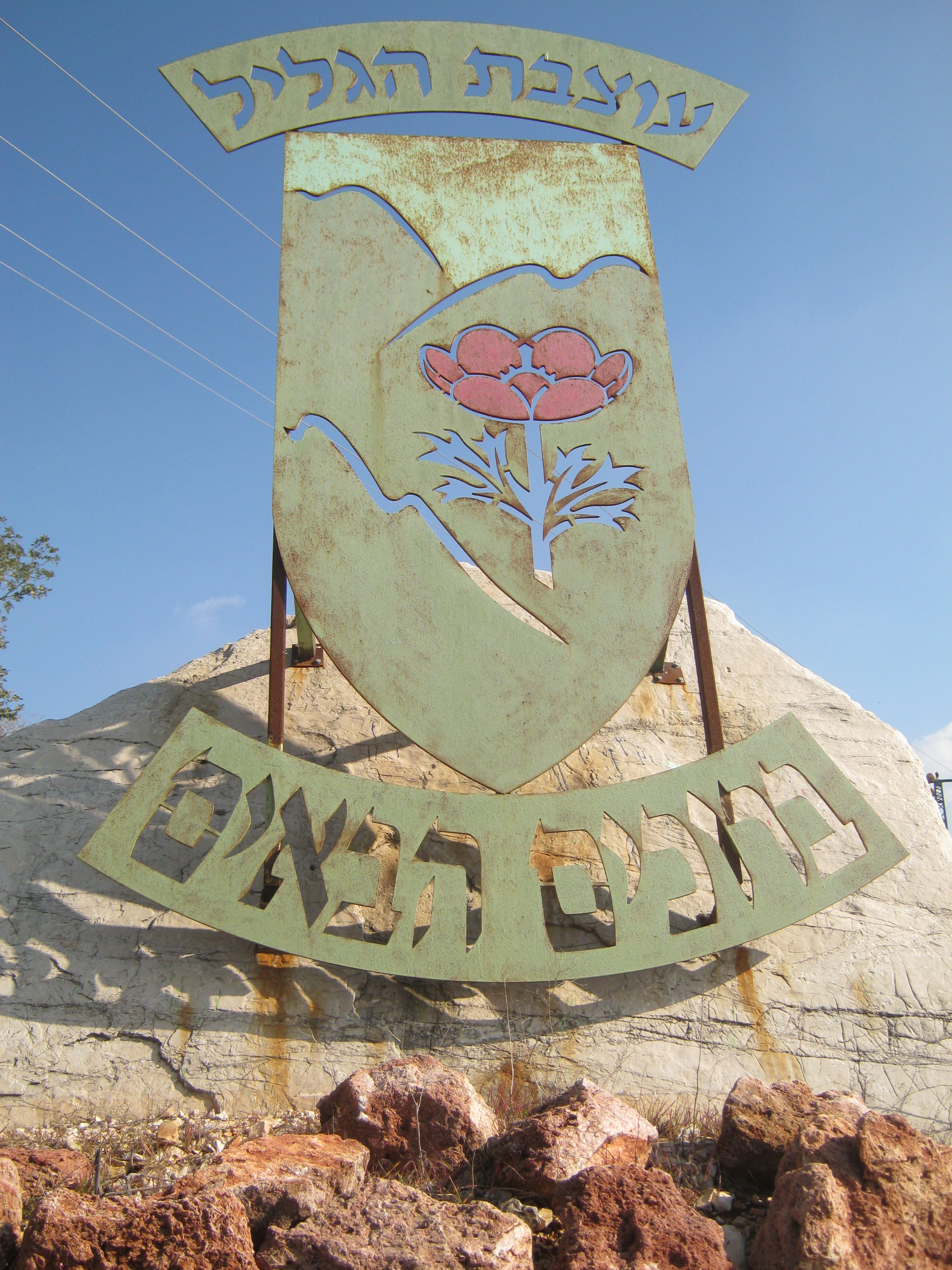
91st Division logo, at Biranit entrance

- 91st Division "Galilee"
  - 3rd Infantry Brigade "Alexandroni" (Reserve)
    - 7012th Infantry Battalion
    - 8101st Infantry Battalion
    - 9203rd Infantry Battalion
    - (6609th) Reconnaissance Battalion
    - 5280th Combat Engineer Battalion
    - 5503rd Logistic Battalion
    - 8144th Signal Company
  - 8th Armored Brigade "HaZaken" ("The Old One") (Reserve)
    - 89th Armored Battalion
    - 121st Armored Battalion
    - 129th Armored Battalion
    - 5508th Logistic Battalion
    - 8th Reconnaissance Company
    - 760th Signal Company
  - 185th Infantry Brigade "Tel Hai" (Reserve) — defence of the Golan Heights and communities on the Israel-Lebanon border
    - 1851st Infantry Battalion "Tal" — Kiryat Shmona and surrounding communities
    - 1852nd Infantry Battalion "Golan Defenders" — Tiberias, Poria Illit, Katzrin, and surrounding communities
    - 1853rd Infantry Battalion "Magen HaGalil" — Ma'alot-Tarshiha, Nahariya, Rosh Hanikra, and surrounding communities
    - 1854th Infantry Battalion "Anchor" — Israeli Navy veterans who were converted to infantry
    - 1855th Infantry Battalion "Galilee Defenders" — Acre, Karmiel, and surrounding communities
  - 300th Territorial Brigade "Bar'am" – Western section of the Israel Lebanon border
    - 299th Infantry Battalion
    - 7112th Infantry Battalion
    - 9300th Infantry Battalion
    - Logistic Battalion
    - Signal Company
  - 769th Territorial Brigade "Hiram" – Eastern section of the Israel Lebanon border
    - 134th Infantry Battalion
    - 920th Infantry Battalion
    - 7106th Infantry Battalion
    - Logistic Battalion
    - 5161st Signal Company
  - 7338th Artillery Brigade "Adirim" ("Mighty Ones") (Reserve)
    - 508th Artillery Battalion (M270 "Menatetz" MLRS)
    - 9231st Artillery Battalion (M109 "Doher" self-propelled howitzers)
    - 9294th Artillery Battalion (M109 "Doher" self-propelled howitzers)
    - Target Acquisition Battalion
    - Signal Company
  - Division Logistic Group
  - 671st Division Signals Battalion "Nofim"
  - 869th Field Intelligence Battalion "Shahaf" ("Seagull")
  - 946th Air Defence Battalion "Dragon" (VSHORAD)
  - 91st Combat Engineer Company "Galilee Cats"
  - Tunnel Locating and Detection Technology Laboratory
