= Aluf =

Senior military rank of the Israel Defense Forces

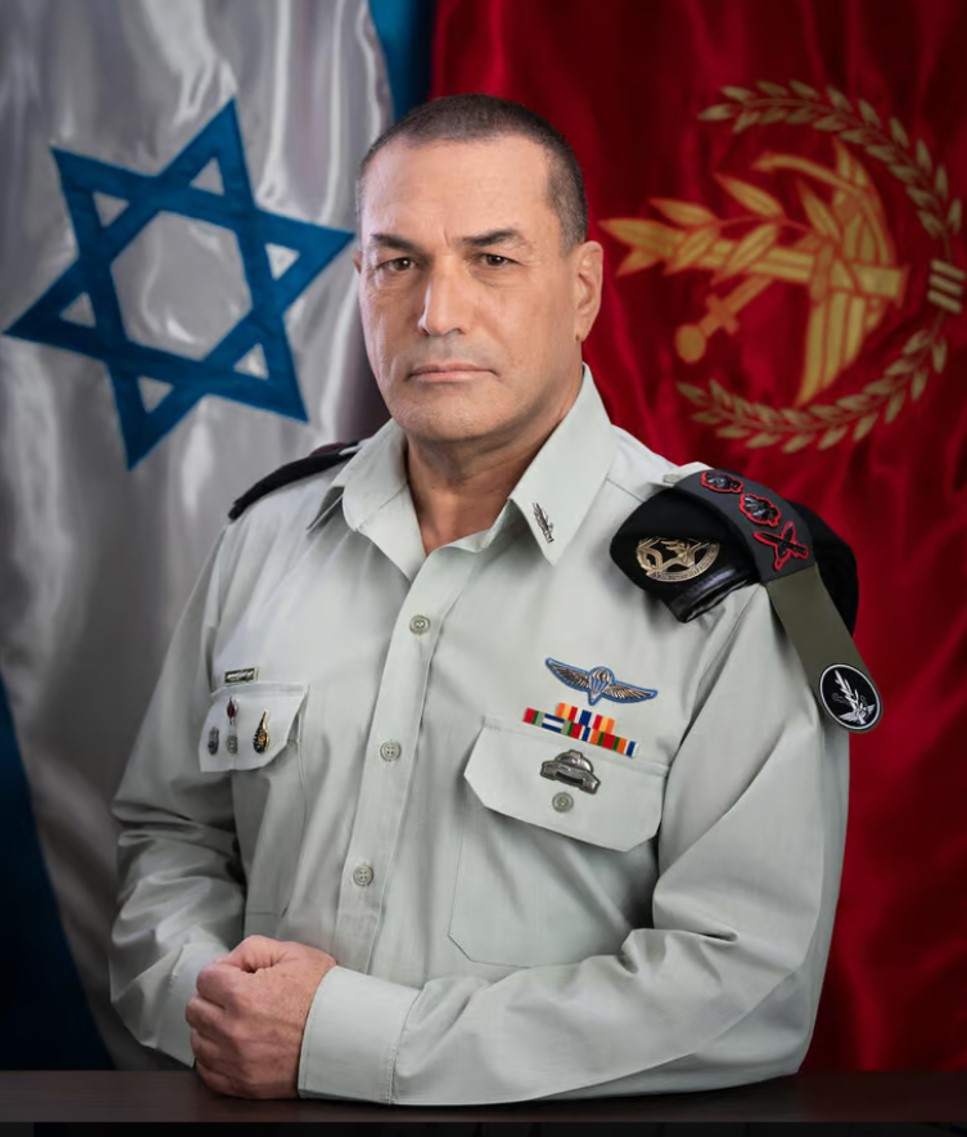
Rav aluf Eyal Zamir

Aluf (Hebrew: אלוף, lit. 'champion' or "first/leader of a group" in Biblical Hebrew) is a senior military rank in the Israel Defense Forces (IDF) for officers who in other countries would have the rank of general, air marshal, or admiral. In addition to the aluf rank, four other ranks' names are derivatives of aluf (for which abbreviations can be used), together constituting the five highest ranks in the IDF.

== Etymology ==
The term aluf comes from the Bible (Hebrew: אַלּוּף, romanized: ’allup̄): the Edomites used it as a rank of nobility and the later books of the Bible use it to describe Israelite captains as well, e.g. Zechariah 9:7, 12:5-6, and later and Psalms 55:13, where it is used as a general term for teacher. It comes from a Semitic root meaning "thousand," making an ’allup̄ the one who commands a thousand people. Strong's Christian Bible Concordance, however connects the word used to describe the Dukes of Edom to a different root "alf" denoting a teacher and the root for the animal 'ox' from which the letter aleph itself is derived, rather than eleph thousand; the same 3 letters comprise them both, however.

Aside from being a military rank, "aluf" is also used in a civilian context, particularly in sports, meaning "champion".

== Rank order of aluf and its derivatives ==
The Israel Defense Forces (IDF) form an integrated force and the Israel Defense Forces ranks are the same in all services.

- Rav aluf (Hebrew: רב-אלוף, lit. 'Arch champion'): Chief of the General Staff (Israel)
- Aluf (Hebrew: אלוף, lit. 'Champion'): Arms, Branches, Regional commands
- Tat aluf (Hebrew: תת-אלוף, lit. 'Sub champion'): Corps, Divisions
- Aluf mishne (Hebrew: אלוף משנה, lit. 'Champion deputy'): Brigades
- Sgan aluf (Hebrew: סגן-אלוף, lit. 'Vice champion'): Battalions

Rank group	General officers			Field officers
Israel Defense Forces
Israel Defense Forces	רב-אלוף; Rav aluf	אלוף; Aluf	תת-אלוף; Tat aluf	אלוף משנה; Aluf mishne	סגן-אלוף; Sgan aluf
Abbreviation	רא״ל; Ra'al	אלוף; Aluf	תא״ל; Ta'al	אל״ם; Alam	סא״ל; Sa'al
English equivalents	Lieutenant general	Major general	Brigadier general	Colonel	Lieutenant colonel

Rav aluf, usually translated as "lieutenant general", is the most senior rank in the IDF. The rank is given only to the Chief of the General Staff, so there can only be one active rav aluf under normal circumstances. However this can change in a time of war. During the Yom Kippur War in 1973, retired Rav Aluf Haim Bar-Lev was recalled into service, replacing Shmuel Gonen as the commander of the southern theater. Thus, along with Chief of the General Staff David Elazar (who had succeeded Bar-Lev in that position the previous year), there were two rav alufs in active service.

The three Israeli military forces, land and air power, and navy have the same ranks, although separate naval ranks were used for a short time in the 1950s; an officer who would be a OF-7, major general, air vice-marshal, or rear admiral elsewhere is an aluf in any of the Israeli forces.

The non-Hebrew word "general" was also adopted into Hebrew (Hebrew: גנרל), and is used to refer to the generals of foreign armies.

== See also ==
- Israel Defense Forces ranks
- Mickey Marcus - the IDF's first aluf.
- Yaakov Dori - the IDF's first rav aluf (Chief of Staff)
