= Itzik Cohen =

Itzik Cohen may refer to:

- Itzik Cohen (footballer, born 1983), Israeli footballer
- Itzik Cohen (footballer, born 1990), Israeli footballer
- Itzik Cohen (actor) (born 1968), Israeli actor, filmmaker, and television producer
- Itzik Cohen (officer) (born 1977), Israeli military officer

== See also ==
- Yitzhak Cohen (born 1951), Israeli politician
