= Yaniv Asor =

Israeli general

- יניב עשור
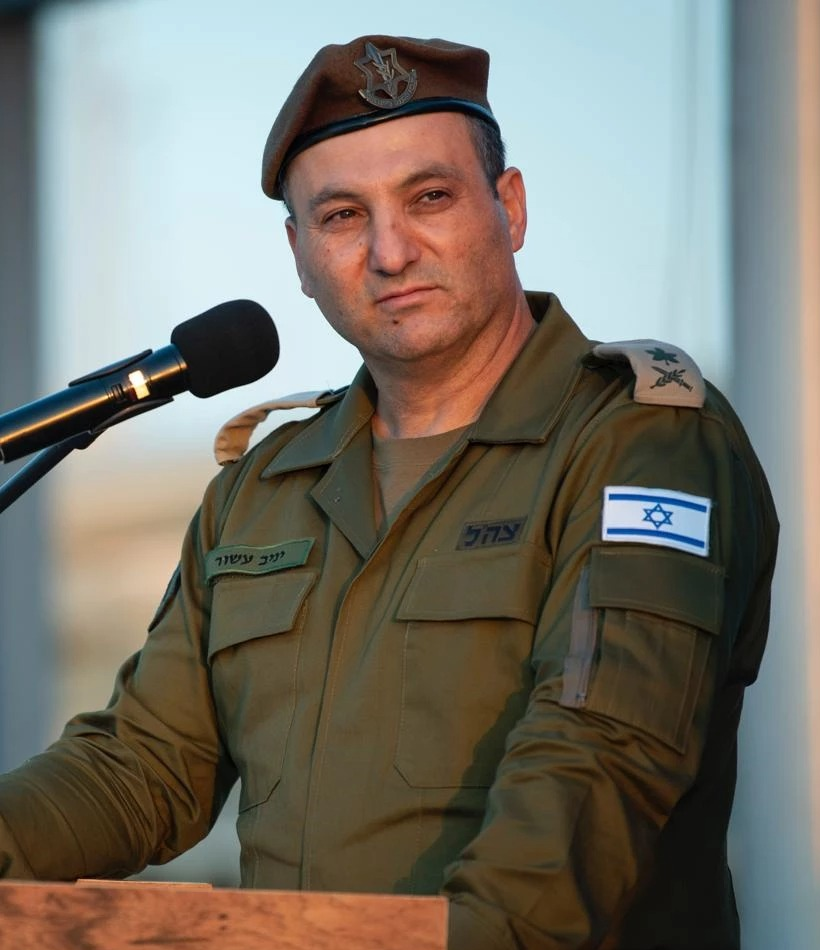
- Born: 15 June 1972 (age 54); Israel
- Education: Royal College of Defence Studies
- Military career
- Allegiance: Israel
- Branch: Israel Defense Forces
- Service years: 1990–present
- Rank: Aluf (major general)
- Conflicts: South Lebanon conflict (1985–2000); First Intifada; Second Intifada; 2006 Lebanon War; Operation Cast Lead; Operation Pillar of Defense; Operation Protective Edge; Operation Guardian of the Walls

Yaniv Asor (Hebrew: יניב עשור; born July 15, 1972) is a member of Israel Defense Forces with the rank of Aluf, serving as chief of the IDF Southern Command. Previously he served as head of the Personnel Directorate, head of the Operations Branch in the Operations Directorate, commander of the Bashan Division, commander of the Golani Brigade, deputy commander of the Ga'ash Formation, and commander of the Hirum Formation.

== Biography ==
Asor, son of Hanania and Mazal, of Moroccan jewish origin, was born and raised in Mivtahim moshav. He enlisted in the IDF in 1990, and was assigned to the 12th Battalion of the Golani Brigade. He underwent infantry training, a squad commanders course, and an infantry officers course. Upon completing the course he returned to the 12th Battalion and served as a platoon commander in Company C. In 1996 he was appointed commander of a rifle platoon in the 12th Battalion, and served in this position during Operation Grapes of Wrath, among others. He later served as safety officer of the Golani Brigade. Subsequently, he served as commander of the Golani Brigade's reconnaissance company from 1997 to 1999. He then served as deputy commander of the 51st Battalion from 2001 to 2002, including during Operation Defensive Shield. In 2002 he attended the US Marine Corps Command and Staff College in the United States. Upon his return he served as operations officer for the Golani Brigade from 2003 to 2004.

In 2004 he was promoted to Lt. Col. and appointed commander of the 51st Battalion, serving until 2006. During his tenure, the battalion was operationally deployed in Hebron, during which a soldier from the battalion was killed in a traffic accident. He subsequently led the battalion during the implementation of the Gaza disengagement plan, Operation Summer Rains, and other operations against militancy in the Gaza Strip during the Second Intifada, as well as the 2006 Lebanon War. During the war he commanded the battalion at the Battle of Bint Jbeil, among others. Battalion fighters killed dozens of Hezbollah militants, destroyed three Katyusha rocket launchers, and blew up captured ammunition and rocket stockpiles. In the fierce battle, the battalion suffered eight killed, including his deputy Roi Klein, and twenty wounded. For their activity during the war, the battalion under his command was awarded a unit citation by GOC Northern Command, Gadi Eisenkot. After the war he was appointed commander of the Egoz reconnaissance unit from 2006 to 2008, leading operations in the Gaza Strip. In one operation in January 2008, unit forces under his command, with armor and air support, killed 18 militants, including the son of senior Hamas official Mahmoud al-Zahar. He then left for studies.

In September 2009 he was promoted to Colonel and appointed commander of the Hirum Formation, serving until July 2011. Subsequently, he served as deputy commander of the Ga'ash Formation from 2011 to 2012. On July 19, 2012, he was appointed commander of the Golani Brigade, serving until June 11, 2014. He then left for studies in the United States. On September 9, 2015, he was promoted to Brig. Gen. and appointed commander of the Bashan Division, serving until February 11, 2018. On April 9, 2018, he was appointed head of the Operations Branch in the Operations Directorate, a position he held until October 13, 2020.

On February 14, 2021, he was promoted to Maj. Gen. and on February 21 he assumed office as Head of the IDF Personnel Directorate.

On 5 March 2025, Chief of the General Staff Eyal Zamir appointed him to replace Yaron Finkelman as chief of the Southern Command. He took command on 12 March following a handover ceremony held in Gaza.

== Personal life ==
Asor resides in Kfar Haroeh, is married to Dikla, and father of four. He holds a bachelor's degree in logistics from Bar-Ilan University, and a master's degree in business administration from Ben-Gurion University of the Negev. He is a graduate of the US Marine Corps Command and Staff College, and the Royal College of Defense Studies in the UK.

== Criticism ==
Several reports have highlighted Asor's responsibility for disproportionate civilian casualties during the Gaza war, particularly in his role as the head of the Southern Command.
