= Kibbutz (disambiguation) =

A kibbutz is an agriculture-based collective community in Israel.

Kibbutz may also refer to:

- Kibbutz (album), an album by the Japanese noise band Merzbow
- Kibbutz (film), a 2005 Israeli documentary directed by Racheli Schwartz
- A "study group" in a Yeshiva is sometimes referred to as a "Kibbutz" - see Chavrusa § Definition - especially in older usage
