= Avigdor Ben-Gal =

Israeli general (1936–2016)

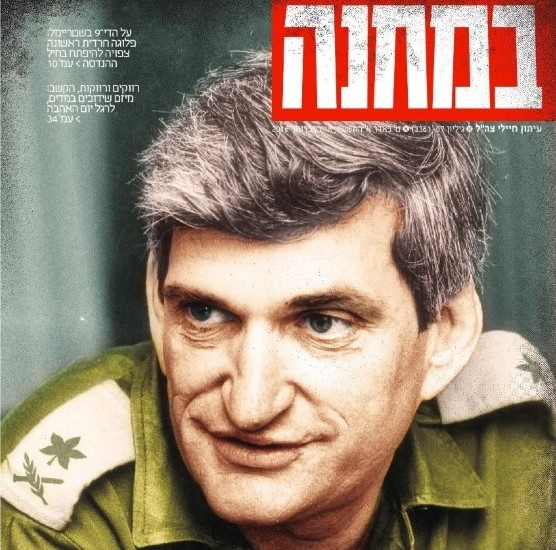
- Native name: אביגדור בן-גל
- Nickname: Yanush
- Born: Janusz Ludwig Goldlust; 1936; Łódź, Second Polish Republic
- Died: 13 February 2016 (age 79–80) Israel
- Allegiance: Israel
- Branch: Israel Defense Forces
- Service years: 1956–1981
- Rank: Aluf (Major General)
- Commands: 7th Armored Brigade (Israel); Northern Command
- Conflicts: 1956 Suez Crisis; Six-Day War; Yom Kippur War; Lebanese Civil War

Avigdor "Yanush" Ben-Gal (Hebrew: אביגדור בן-גל; 1936 – February 13, 2016; born Janusz Goldlust) was an Israeli general.

== Early life ==
He was born in 1936, in Łódź, Poland, as Janusz Ludwig Goldlust. When he was just three years old, World War II broke out with Germany invading Poland. His family left Poland for the Soviet Union, and finally arrived in Siberia in Soviet Russia. On the way during the trail his parents disappeared somewhere. After his parents disappeared, he eventually arrived in Tel Aviv with his sister Ilana.

The journey was difficult, the two toddlers hitchhiked and jumped on trains until they were collected by the troops of Polish Gen. Wladyslaw Anders with whom they proceeded to Tehran. In Iran, the Jewish Agency collected hundreds of such lost kids, placed them in camps, fed them, and from there on to the Tehran transport, to British-ruled India by train, to Egypt by sea, and finally, by train again, to Mandate Palestine. "Yanush," as everyone continued calling him despite his Hebraicized name, reached the Land of Israel four-and-a half years after leaving Poland. The two siblings were taken in and raised by a distant cousin.

== Military career ==
A few years after Israel became independent and won the 1948 Arab-Israeli War, Ben-Gal was drafted into the Israel Defense Forces (IDF). His first combat experience came during the 1956 Suez War with Egypt. Despite having dreamed of being a doctor, he decided to stay in the army after his mandatory military service was finished. In an interview, he explained his reasons:

"I never intended to turn the army into a career, but I remained because I liked it. I loved the Negev, the desert, the fields. I loved speeding in jeeps. Later I got used to the army, and it became a part of me. And maybe also, I was afraid to make a new start in life."

During the Six-Day War in 1967, he was the operations chief of a brigade that broke through Egyptian fortifications in the Sinai. He lost half his right foot when his jeep struck a mine. By 1972, he had been appointed commander of a brigade.

During the Yom Kippur War in 1973, Ben-Gal commanded the 7th Armored Brigade and oversaw the defense of the Golan Heights against Syrian attack. Ben-Gal had foreseen the war two weeks before it started, and had begun preparing his brigade. As the threat of war wasn't being taken seriously in Israel at the time, he had been branded a "madman". However, when the war broke out, his brigade was the only IDF unit in a state of full readiness.

The heroic stand of the 7th Armored Brigade and Yanush Ben-Gal's personal heroism and leadership are believed by many to be decisive factors in the Israeli victory over the Syrians.

In 1977, Ben-Gal was appointed head of the Northern Command. He served in this position until late-summer 1981, when he was replaced by General Amir Drori. He played a key role in Operation Litani (1978). Subsequently he was responsible for arming and training Saad Haddad's militia, which eventually became the South Lebanon Army. The frequent IDF raids deep into southern Lebanon, which were credited with reducing cross-border raids, led to comments in the Hebrew press suggesting that he was waging a private war. In 1981 he gave an interview in which he said Israel should "give all-out support for the Christians to enable them to liberate Lebanon from the Syrian conquest."

In August 1979 Ben-Gal was "rebuked" by Defence Minister Ezer Weizman after he was quoted as saying that Israel's Arab citizens were "a cancer in our body ... waiting for an opportunity to do us down."

== Later life ==
In June 1997 he was called to testify in a libel suit that Ariel Sharon brought against the Israeli newspaper Ha'aretz for their claim that he had concealed his plans for an operation into Lebanon in 1982.

His testimony, however, contradicted earlier statements he had made at Tel Aviv University, where he had stated that the greatest problem with the Lebanon War was the "secret, unapproved plan of the defense minister and chief of staff."

The following month, Ha'aretz requested that the Attorney General investigate the possibility that Ben-Gal had given false testimony in court in exchange for business favours from Sharon. The complaint noted that shortly before his appearance at the trial, Ben-Gal was sent by Sharon to explore the possibility of a large natural gas deal in Russia.

In 2001, Ben-Gal reportedly submitted an application to train the Congo Army in Israel.

From 1996 to 1999, he was chairman of the board of directors for Israel Aerospace Industries, succeeding Zvi Zur and succeeded by Ori Orr. He also served on the board for the International Policy Institute for Counter-Terrorism.

During a 2007 military conference in Latrun, Ben-Gal sharply criticized what he viewed as a deterioration in the battle readiness of the IDF, and claimed that the IDF's technological revolution has turned soldiers into "bionic machines" and sown fear among senior officers that open criticism would hamper advancement in their own careers. He expressed the view that all the new technologies being introduced were useless, and claimed that it had gotten to the point where commanders prefer to email each other instead of interacting.

From 2009 until his death, he served as chairman of the board of directors for cyberarms firm NSO Group. Ben-Gal died on February 13, 2016.
