= Itzik Cohen (officer) =

Israeli general

- איציק כהן
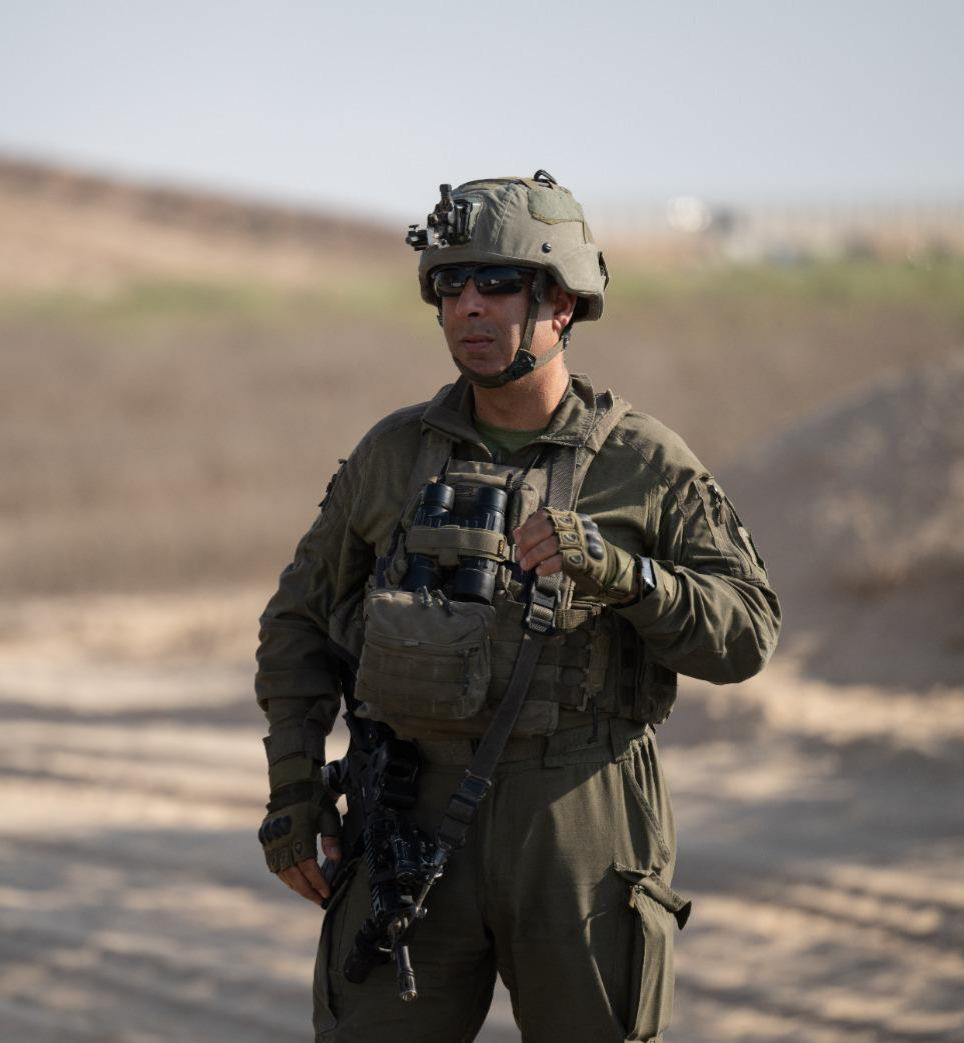
- Born: 1977 (age 48–49); Jerusalem, Israel
- Military career
- Allegiance: Israel
- Branch: Israel Defense Forces
- Service years: 1995–present
- Rank: Brigadier general
- Conflicts: First Intifada; Second Intifada; 2006 Lebanon War; Operation Cast Lead; Operation Pillar of Defense; Operation Protective Edge; Operation Guardian of the Walls; Gaza war; 2026 Israeli–United States strikes on Iran

Yitzhak "Itzik" Cohen (Hebrew: יצחק (איציק) כהן; born in 1977) is an IDF officer with the rank of Aluf (equivalent to Major General) who served as head of the Operations Directorate. Previously, he served as the commander of the Steel Formation, the commander of the 80th Division, the Sinai Division, the Givati Brigade, the Judah Formation, the Arava Formation, the Givati Brigade's training base, and the Tzabar Battalion.

== Biography ==
Cohen was born and raised in Jerusalem. He enlisted in the IDF in 1995 and was placed in the Rotem Battalion of the Givati Brigade. He underwent infantry combat training, completed an infantry commanders’ course, and an officers' course. After finishing the course, he returned to the Rotem Battalion as a company commander. He then served as a battalion commander in the Givati Brigade between 2002 and 2003, leading the unit in combat against Palestinian political violence during the Second Intifada in the Gaza Strip. Later, he became the deputy commander of the Givati reconnaissance unit between 2006 and 2007. Afterward, he went to pursue higher education and returned to the Givati Brigade as the operations officer, serving in this role between 2008 and 2009, including during Operation Cast Lead.

In 2009, he was promoted to the rank of Lieutenant Colonel and appointed as the commander of the Tzabar Battalion, serving until 2011. He then served as the head of the Urban Warfare branch in the military training department between 2011 and 2012. Subsequently, he was appointed as the commander of the Givati Brigade's training base between 2012 and 2014. During Operation Protective Edge, he joined the fight as a staff officer in the Givati Brigade's command. On October 23, 2014, he was promoted to the rank of Colonel and appointed as the commander of the Arava Formation, serving until June 2016. On July 5, 2016, he was appointed as the commander of the Judah Formation, a position he held until August 6, 2018. Afterwards, he was a participant in the National Security College in the 46th cycle (2018–2019). On July 14, 2019, he was appointed as the commander of the Givati Brigade, serving until July 7, 2021, when he was promoted to the rank of Brigadier general.

On August 4, 2021, he was appointed as the commander of the 80th Division. On May 18, 2022, he was also appointed as the acting commander of the Sinai Division, serving in this role until August 2022. During his tenure as the commander of the 80th Division, he was reprimanded following a shooting incident on the Israel-Egypt border in which three soldiers were killed, due to his overall responsibility and lack of oversight in implementing procedures. He served in this position until August 6, 2023.

On September 20, 2023, he was appointed as the commander of the 'Steel Formation', and he is currently commanding it in the Gaza war.

On 5 March 2025, Chief of the General Staff Eyal Zamir appointed him to replace Oded Basyuk as chief of the IDF Operations Directorate. He was also set to be promoted to major general.

== Personal life ==
Cohen resides in Negba, is married to Chava, and is a father of four. He is a graduate of the Interdisciplinary Center Herzliya in Government and Strategy and holds a degree in political science from the University of Haifa.
