= Oded Basyuk =

Israeli military general

- עודד בסיוק
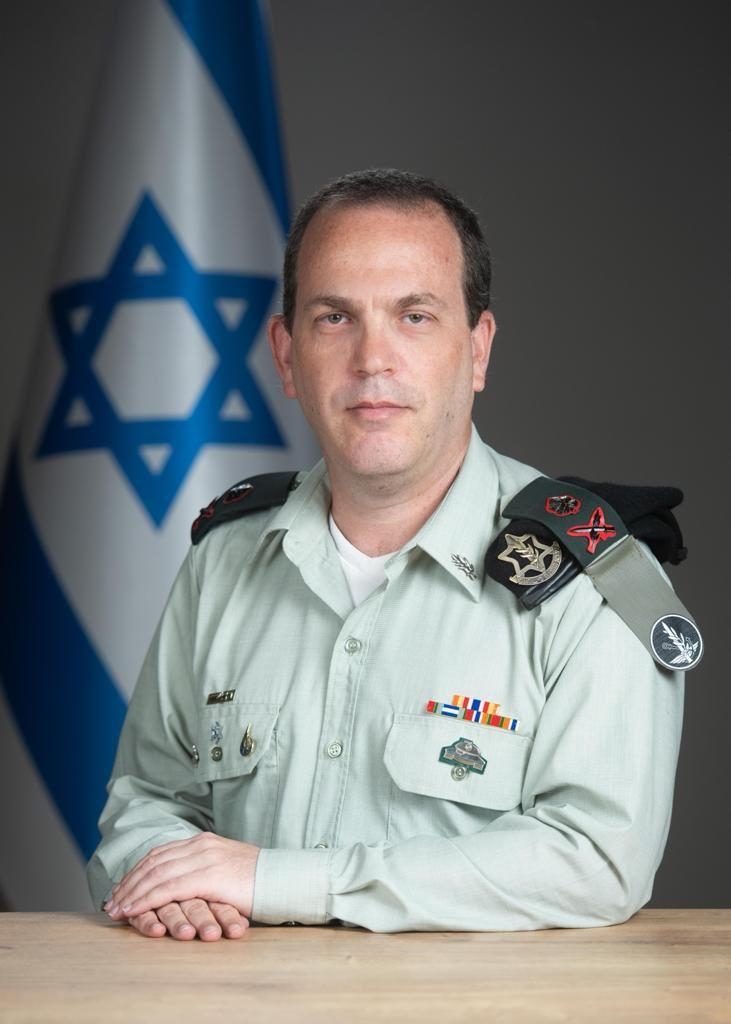
- Born: 1973 (age 52–53); Israel
- Military career
- Allegiance: Israel
- Branch: Israel Defense Forces
- Service years: 1991–2025
- Rank: Aluf (major general)
- Conflicts: South Lebanon conflict (1985–2000); First Intifada; Second Intifada; 2006 Lebanon War; Operation Cast Lead; Operation Pillar of Defense; Operation Protective Edge; Operation Guardian of the Walls; Gaza war

Oded Basyuk (Hebrew: עודד בסיוק; born 1973) is an IDF officer with the rank of Aluf (equivalent to Major General) who previously served as head of the Operations Directorate from 2021 until his resignation on July 3, 2025. Previously he served as head of the Planning Branch in the Planning Directorate, commander of the Steel Formation, commander of the 146th Division, head of the Operations Department in the Operations Directorate, commander of 7th Armored Brigade and commander of Battalion 82.

== Biography ==
Basyuk was born to Uri and Ruth. He grew up in Ramat Hasharon, and has one sister. He is a graduate of Alon High School.

He enlisted in the Armored Corps in 1991, served as an officer in Brigade 188's Battalion 53, and in 1995-1996 served as commander of an armored platoon, commanding the Beaufort Castle during the Security Belt campaign. In his next role he served as head of the Merkava desk in the office of the Chief Armored Corps Officer, and then went to study. In 2001 he was appointed Brigade 188's operations officer, and in 2003 he was appointed commander of Brigade 188's Battalion 71.

He completed his role after a fatal accident that occurred during his tenure. Afterwards he went on to serve as branch head at the Fire Training Center in the Ground Forces training base, and in 2005 took command of Brigade 7's Battalion 82, serving in this position during the 2006 Lebanon War. Immediately after the 2006 Hezbollah cross-border raid, he was the first to arrive at the kidnapping site. He set out with a tank from his battalion on a mission to identify Hezbollah's escape route. The tank hit an explosive device at the "Kipat HaDegel" outpost and its entire crew was killed. Basyuk remained in place to secure the evacuation of the bodies under fire, and continued to lead the battalion throughout the fighting in the western sector of Lebanon. After completing his role as battalion commander, in 2007 he was appointed operations officer of the Etzion Formation.

In 2009 he was promoted to the rank of Colonel and appointed commander of the Armored Fire Brigades, while also instructing the company and battalion commanders’ courses. In July 2011 he was appointed commander of Brigade 7, serving in this position until June 2013. During his command, tensions rose in the Golan Heights sector, and forces under his command conducted fire towards Syrian army positions. During this period, he prepared and drilled the brigade's forces for the planned ground maneuver of Operation Pillar of Defense in the Gaza Strip.

In his next role, he was appointed head of Operations at the Operations Directorate, serving from 2013 to 2015, including during the kidnapping and murder of the three teenagers and Operation Protective Edge, which led to the destruction of Hamas' offensive tunnels.

On August 4, 2015, he was promoted to the rank of Brigadier General and appointed commander of the 146th Division, serving in this position until May 16, 2017.

On June 13, 2017, he was appointed commander of the Steel Formation. During this time he was involved in developing the IDF's plan to strike Hamas’ tunnel, as executed during Operation Guardian of the Walls. In 2019 he was appointed head of the Planning Branch in the Planning Directorate, where he led the implementation of the multi-year Tnufa program.

In June 2021 he was promoted to the rank of Major General and appointed head of the Operations Directorate. Among other things, he served in this position during Operation Breaking Dawn (5–7 August 2022) and Operation Shield and Arrow (9–13 May 2023).

During the Iron Sword war, Basyuk served as the Head of the Operations Directorate. On the night of October 6–7, 2023, Basyuk participated in a secure telephone consultation with Chief of Staff Herzi Halevi and Southern Command chief Yaron Finkelman regarding intelligence indications of unusual activity in Gaza. The consultation concluded without a decision to raise the alert level or mobilize significant forces.

In March 2025, Basyuk announced his intention to resign from the IDF. He completed his tenure in the summer of 2025. In November 2025, following the release of the Turgeman Committee's investigation into the failures of October 7, Chief of Staff Eyal Zamir ordered Basyuk to be removed from reserve duty, citing his command responsibility for the events.

== Personal life ==
Basyuk resides in Hod Hasharon, is married to Limor, and has four children. He holds a bachelor's degree in law and business administration from the Interdisciplinary Center Herzliya, and a master's degree in political science from the University of Haifa and the National Security College.
