= Tal Russo =

Israeli general (born 1959)

- טַל רוּסוֹ
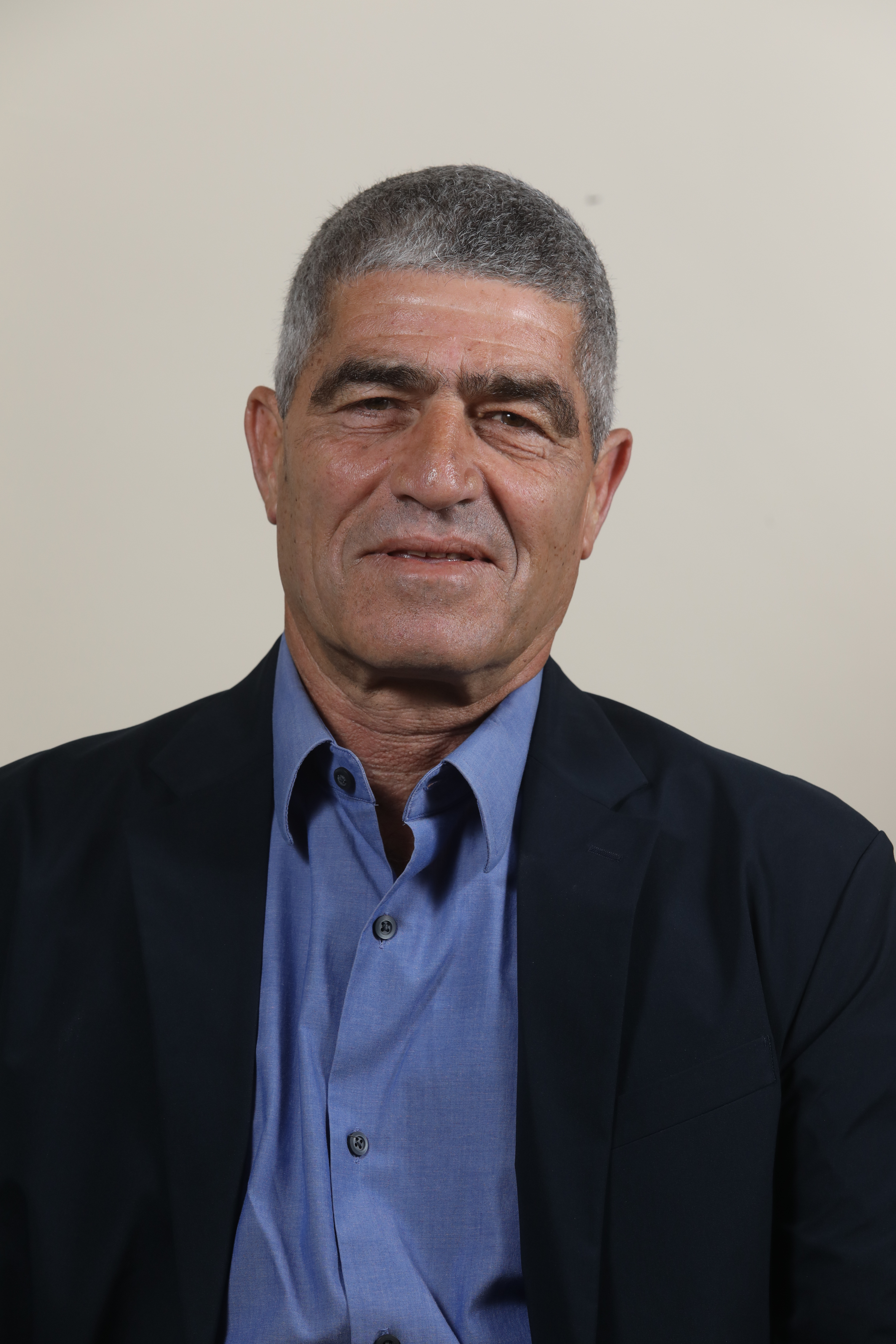

Faction represented in the Knesset
- 2019: Israeli Labor Party

Personal details
- Born: 27 September 1959 (age 67) Hulata, Israel
- Party: Yashar (since 2025)
- Other political affiliations: Labor (2019–2024)
- Education: University of Haifa; Tel Aviv University

Military service
- Allegiance: Israel
- Branch/service: Israeli Air Force
- Years of service: 1978–2014
- Rank: Aluf

Tal Russo (Hebrew: טַל רוּסוֹ; born 27 September 1959) is a general of the Israel Defense Forces, serving in the reserves. He heads the IDF's Depth Corps. He also served as an MK for the Labor Party.

== Early life and education ==
Russo was born in kibbutz Hulata, Israel. He earned a BA in political science from the University of Haifa and an MBA from Tel Aviv University.

== Military career ==
He was drafted into the IDF in 1978. He served with the Israeli Air Force special forces unit Shaldag until discharged in 1981, but returned in 1982 to command a squad during the 1982 Lebanon War. That same year he received his officer's ranks, and then continued to advance up the chain of command, spending much of his early career in the special forces.

During the 2006 Lebanon War, Russo served as the Assistant to the Head of the Operations Directorate in special missions. In October 2006 Chief of Staff Dan Halutz recommended Russo to replace Operations Directorate head Gadi Eizenkot, who had been promoted to head of Northern Command. Russo's promotion was subsequently approved by Defense Minister Amir Peretz.

In October 2010, Russo was appointed as commander of the Southern Command. He oversaw Operation Pillar of Defense, before retiring in April 2013.

== Political career ==
Russo joined the Israeli Labor Party and was second on the party's electoral list in the April 2019 Israeli legislative election. Russo was elected to the Knesset though he resigned four months into his term and did not run for re-election.

He joined Gadi Eisenkot's party, Yashar, in 2025.
