= Ori Orr =

Israeli politician (born 1939)

- אורי אור
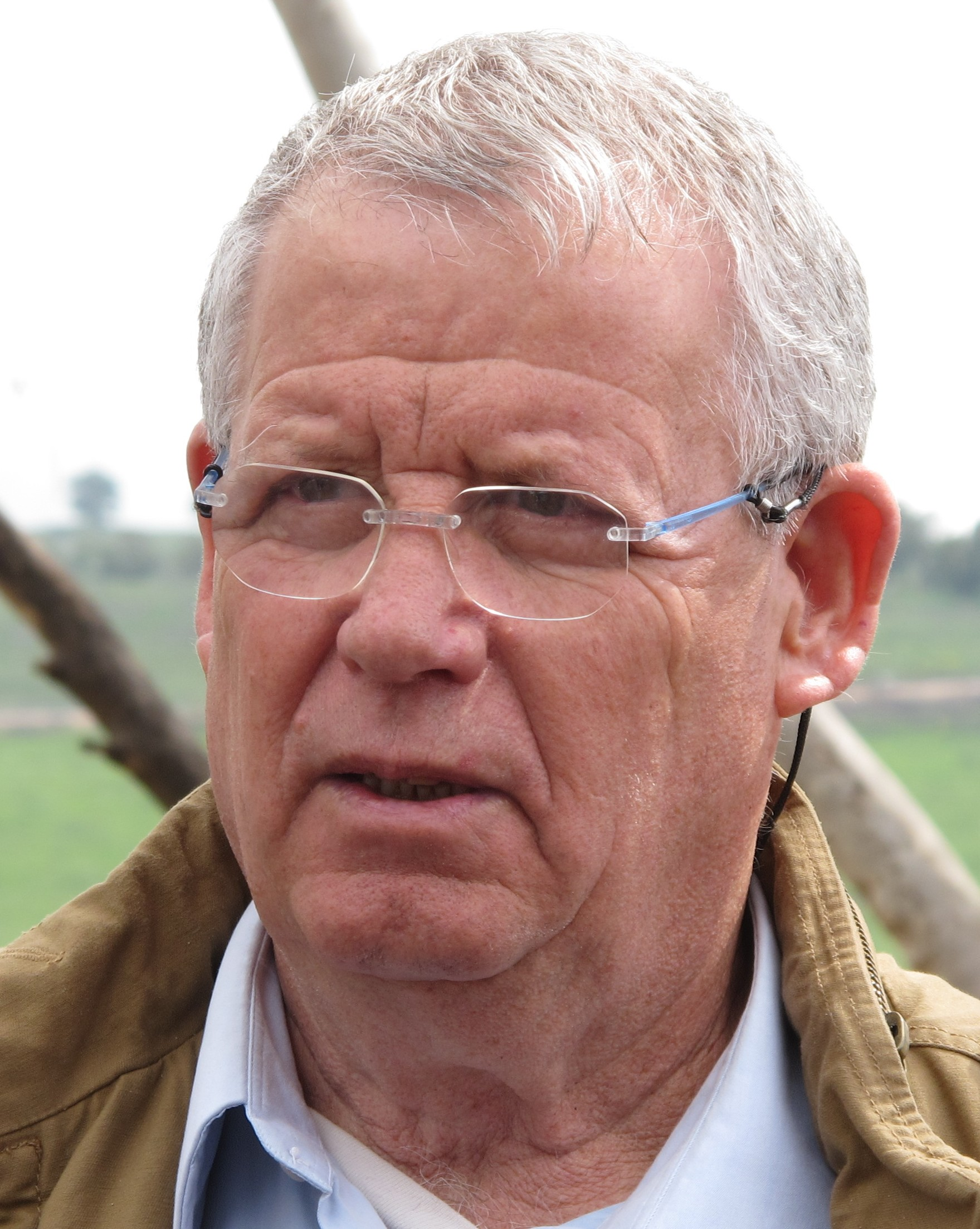
- Orr in 2012

Faction represented in the Knesset
- 1992–1999: Labor Party

Personal details
- Born: 22 April 1939 (age 87) Kfar Haim, Mandatory Palestine

Military service
- Allegiance: Israel
- Branch/service: Israel Defense Forces
- Years of service: 1957–1986 or 1987
- Rank: General
- Commands: 679th (reserve) Armored Brigade; 7th Brigade; Central Command (1981-1983); Northern Command (1983-1986)
- Wars: Six-Day War; Yom Kippur War

Ori Orr (Hebrew: אורי אור; born 22 April 1939) is an Israeli retired general and politician. During his service with the Israel Defense Forces, he headed the Central and Northern Commands. He later served as a member of the Knesset for the Labor Party between 1992 and 1999. During his tenure, he chaired the Foreign Affairs and Defence Committee (1992-1995) and served as Deputy Minister of Defence (1995-1996).

== Early life ==
Orr was born in Kfar Haim, Mandatory Palestine, in 1939. His father had committed aliyah from Austria, while his mother committed aliyah from Russia. He was awarded a Bachelor of Arts degree in Political Science & History from Tel Aviv University.

== Military career ==
Orr was drafted into the Israel Defense Forces in 1957, serving with the Armored Corps. During the Six-Day War, then Captain Orr commanded the Recon Company of the 7th Brigade, which advanced through the northern shore of the Sinai Peninsula. In the War of Attrition, he commanded an armored battalion in the Sinai and the Jordan Valley. He was promoted to lieutenant colonel in August 1973, becoming the commander of the newly formed 679th (reserve) Armored Brigade, which he led during the Yom Kippur War. His Centurion-equipped unit played a significant role in stemming the Syrian attack in the Golan Heights. One of the first reserve units to arrive, it helped save the Israeli headquarters at Nafakh from being overrun. Northern Front commander General Yitzhak Hofi later stated, "Ori saved us today."

Following the Yom Kippur War, Orr was assigned to command the 7th Brigade. In 1976, he was made commander of an armored division on the Golan Heights, with the rank of brigadier general, and later served as Chief of Staff of Central Command. In 1981, he was promoted to general, heading Central Command between 1981 and 1983 and Northern Command between 1983 and 1986, partly during the First Lebanon War. Orr left office as head of the Northern Command on 10 June 1986 and was replaced by Yossi Peled. He was considered as a potential replacement for outgoing Chief of Staff Moshe Levy, and for the role of Deputy Chief of Staff. But was appointed to neither role and retired from the army in 1987. He was formally discharged in 1988.

== Political and business career ==
He served as the Director General of the Jewish National Fund from 1988 until 1992. He was a member of the board of directors of Israel Aerospace Industries between 1988 and 1991.

Orr joined the Labor Party in 1988, heading the party's campaign with young voters during the 1988 election. After the election, in January 1989, Orr was considered for the Chairmanship of the Israel Land Administration, but was not selected. Orr helped organize primary elections for the party's electoral list in the 1992 election. He ran in the primary, seeking election to the 14th slot on the party's electoral list. (Note: The 14th slot on Labor's list was reserved for a representative of the Sharon district. Orr defeated Rafael Edri for the position.) He was subsequently elected to the Knesset, serving as chairperson of the Foreign Affairs and Defence Committee until 1995. After Shimon Peres formed his government following Prime Minister Rabin's assassination, Orr was made Deputy Minister of Defense. He retained his seat in the 1996 elections, while his party went into the opposition.

In 1998, Orr drew criticism for remarks made in an interview with Haaretz journalist Daniel Ben Simon, in which he criticized Sephardi Jews as "Unwilling to hear, learn and understand life to know what's good and what's bad for them", as well as stating Moroccan Jews were "Not eager to understand their surroundings". Orr's remarks were criticized by Labor leader Ehud Barak and President Ezer Weizman, with the latter calling for Orr's retirement from politics. Orr apologized for the remarks, and argued Ben-Shimon had mis-represented his views in the original article. Orr was not included on One Israel's electoral list in the 1999 election on procedural grounds, losing his seat as a result.

In August 1999, Orr was appointed by Barak to serve as Chairman of the Board of Israel Aerospace Industries. He served in the role until 2005. (Note: Orr remained on the board after his chairmanship expired in August 2002, and was appointed Interim chairman at the beginning of every board session until the appointment of a new director in July of 2005) In 2005, he headed a committee that reviewed government funding for the security of Jewish Enclaves in East Jerusalem. Orr currently serves as Chairman of the Board of the Council for Conservation of Heritage Sites in Israel.

Orr is the author of two biographical books: Follow Me (1994) (Hebrew: אחרי), and These are My Brothers (2003) (Hebrew: אלה האחים שלי).

== Political views ==
In 1988, Orr spoke in favor of a negotiated Two-state solution with the Palestine Liberation Organization. In 1993, he opposed a return to the 1967 borders through negotiations wih the Palestinian Authority and Syrian Government, stating an agreement could not include a partition of Jerusalem or the evacuation of all settlements.

== Personal life ==
He is married and has three children.
