= Children of Zion =

Book by Henryk Grynberg

- Author: Henryk Grynberg
- Original title: Dzieci Syjonu
- Publication date: January 1988

The Children of Zion (The Path of Agony of the Tehran Children) is a book written by Henryk Grynberg about "the fate of the Polish Jews".

== Synopsis ==
The Children of Zion, published in January 1998, is considered as a documentary that was based on a collection of fragments of records compiled in the British Mandate of Palestine in 1943 by the Eastern Center for Information, a Polish government group. The book was a source of the testimonies of Jewish children who were evacuated from the Soviet Union to Palestine. Grynberg arranged the “collection of interviews” to serve as a reminder about the Holocaust experience. The Polish children’s experiences during World War II also provided a recollection of their lives before the war. Memories of when the war broke out were also discussed, apart from the “arrival of the Germans and the Russians”, the children’s journeys and life while in exile, and their condition after the so-called Sikorsky Agreement allowed them to leave the work camps. Many of the children had to cope as orphaned émigrés. The original document that had become the basis for Grynberg’s Children of Zion is at the Hoover Institution of Leland Stanford Junior University.

== Identities of the children ==
Grynberg's Children of Zion contains the original list of the Polish children who arrived in Eretz Israel "on February 18th, 1943, those who arrived in August 1943, and those who gave the testimonies". These children escaped from occupied Poland to Russia prior to arriving at Eretz Israel (Land of Israel).

== Translations ==
Grynberg's book was originally published in Polish as Dzieci Syjonu (Warszawa: Karta) in 1994. It was later translated into Hebrew by Zeev Schuss (Yad Vashem, Jerusalem) in 1995. Grynberg’s Children of Zion was translated into English by Jacqueline Mitchell, a United Nations interpreter, and published by Northwestern University Press in 1998.
