= 7th Armored Brigade (Israel) =

Military formation of the Israel Defense Forces

- חטיבה 7
- Insignia of the 7th Brigade
- Active: 1948–present
- Country: Israel
- Allegiance: Israel Defense Forces
- Type: Armor
- Part of: 36th Division
- Garrison/HQ: Camp Katsabia
- Mottos: 7 את החטיבה! (The 7th Division!)
- Engagements: 1948 Arab–Israeli War; 1956 Sinai War; Six-Day War; War of Attrition; Yom Kippur War; 1982 Lebanon War; 2006 Lebanon War; 2008 Lebanon War; Gaza war; 2024 Israeli invasion of Lebanon; Israeli invasion of Syria (2024–present)

Commanders
- Current commander: Aluf mishne Elad Tzuri
- Notable commanders: Avigdor Kahalani, Shmuel Gonen, Yanush Ben-Gal

The 7th "Saar me-Golan" Armored Brigade (Hebrew: חטיבה שבע, Hativa Sheva) is a military formation of the Israel Defense Forces (IDF). Formed during the 1948 Arab–Israeli War, and still in operation, it is the oldest armored brigade in the IDF. Since then, the brigade has taken part in all the IDF's main operations, and stands today as one of 3 main armoured brigades of the IDF.

== History ==
=== Affiliation ===
The brigade has historical ties to the earlier Jewish Brigade, a brigade group of the British Army for Jews from Palestine that was raised during World War II.

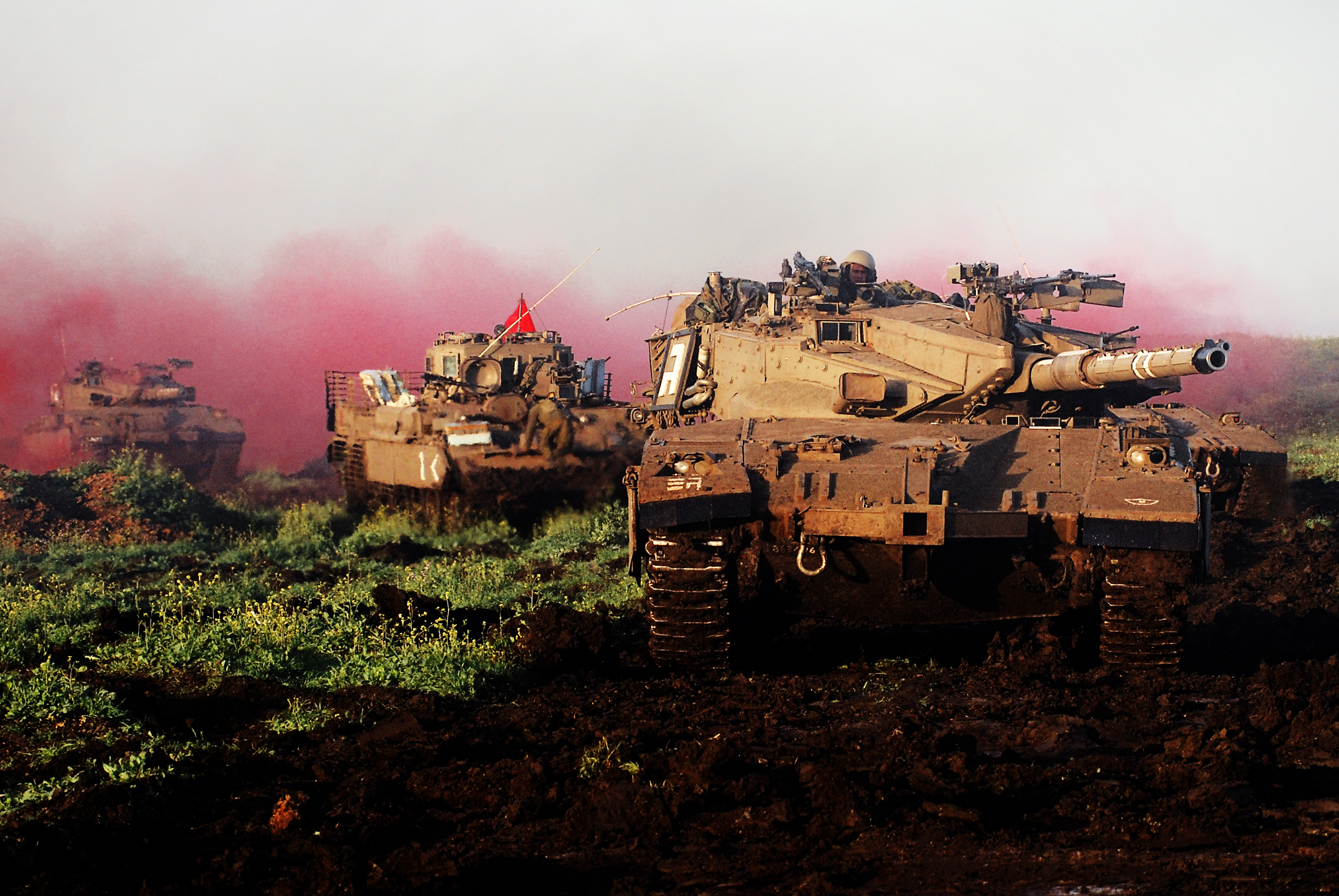
7th Brigade during a military exercise on the Golan Heights

The 7th Brigade once belonged to Israel's Southern Command. The 7th was based in the Golan Heights as part of the 36th Armored Division from the end of the Yom Kippur War until February 2014.

=== Equipment ===
During the 1948 War, the 7th Brigade primarily consisted of Sherman tanks and mounted infantry. Early on, the 7th also contained an artillery element. During the 1960s, the brigade was equipped with British Centurion tanks modified in Israel. These were gradually superseded in the late 1970s by the Israeli-made Merkava main battle tanks, of which several versions have since been employed.

=== Wars ===
The brigade took part in all of Israel's wars.

==== War of Independence ====
During the Battles of Latrun in 1948, the 3rd Alexandroni and 7th Brigades together suffered 139 casualties. The 7th Brigade was initially equipped with jeeps and cars with a few machine guns in July 1948, when the experienced Canadian officer Ben Dunkelman took over. He sized up two approaching Egyptian battle groups equipped with half-tracks, US M4 Sherman tanks and other vehicles. Dunkelman attacked both of them by surprise at night, when the crews were out of their vehicles. The Egyptian soldiers fled, allowing the 7th Brigade to appropriate their arms and vehicles.

The Brigade had so many Canadian, American, and British volunteers that it became known as the "Anglo-Saxon Brigade."

In 1948, the brigade's reputation was as one of the crueler combat forces of the period. Israeli historian Ilan Pappé writes: "In many of the Palestinian oral histories that have now come to the fore, few brigade names appear. However, Brigade Seven is mentioned again and again, together with such adjectives as 'terrorist' and 'barbarous.'"

==== Six-Day War ====
It fought in the 1967 Six-Day War under the command of Colonel Shmuel Gonen (Gorodish).

==== Yom Kippur War ====
In the 1973 Yom Kippur War, under the command of Colonel Avigdor Ben-Gal, it was stationed at the defense line of the northern part of the Golan Heights, sharing the defense with the Barak Armored Brigade, where it successfully repulsed heavy attacks by much larger Syrian forces.

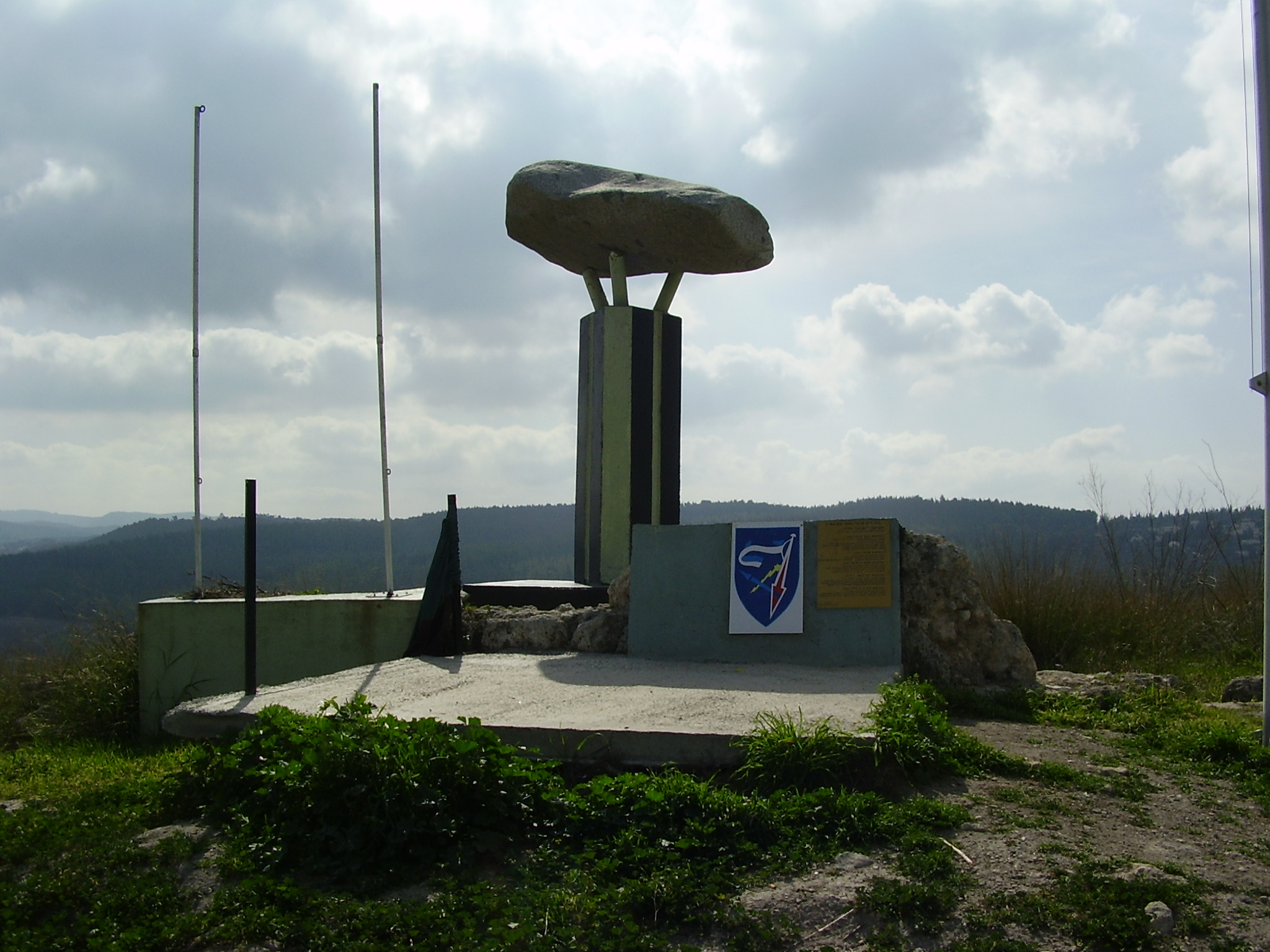
7th Brigade memorial at Latrun

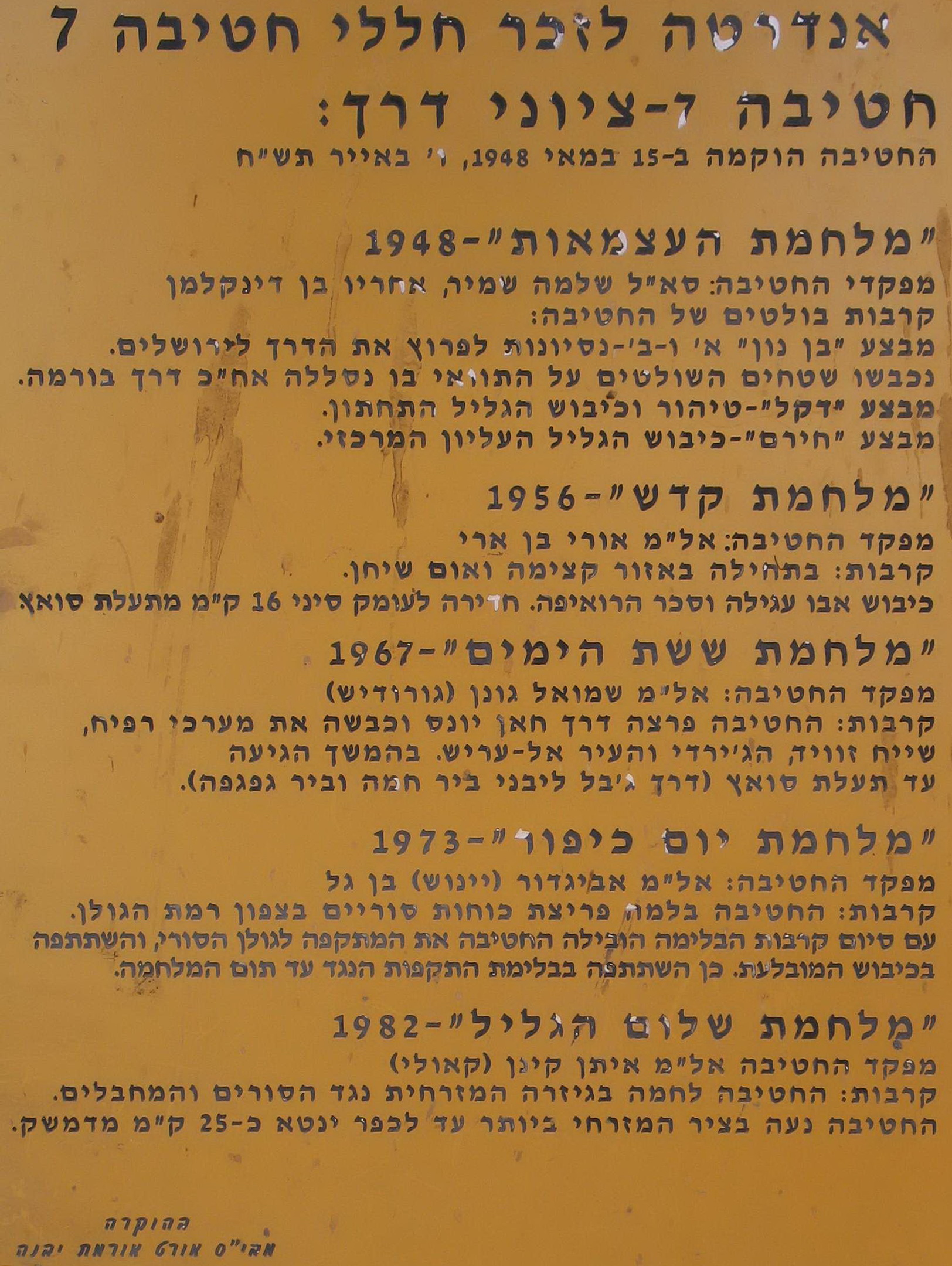
7th Brigade memorial: plaque

== Brigade organization ==
=== 2025 ===
- 7th Armored Brigade "Saar me-Golan"
  - 75th Armored Battalion "Romach/Lance" (Merkava Mk.4M)
  - 77th Armored Battalion "Oz/Courage" (Merkava Mk.4M)
  - 82nd Armored Battalion "Gaash/Rage" (Merkava Mk.4M)
  - 603th Combat Engineer Battalion "Lahav/Blade"
  - 7th Logistics Battalion "Saar me-Golan"
  - Reconnaissance Company
  - 353rd Signals Company "Hanit/Spear"

=== Disbanded units ===
- 71st Battalion, participated in the Battles of Latrun in 1948
- 72nd Battalion, participated in the Battles of Latrun in 1948
- 73rd Battalion, participated in the Battles of Latrun in 1948
- 79th Battalion, participated in Operation Hiram in 1948
- 356th Reconnaissance Company

== Brigade commanders ==
- Shlomo Shamir (May – July 1948)
- Ben Dunkelman (July 1948 – July 1949)
- Yosef Eitan (July 1949 – July 1950)
- Shmuel Goder (October 1950 – August 1953)
- Yitzhak Pundak (April 1954 – October 1955)
- Uri Ben-Ari (October 1955 – December 1956)
- Aharon Nachshon (December 1956 – March 1958)
- David Elazar (December 1958 – April 1959)
- Israel Tal (April 1959 – April 1960)
- Arye Shakhar (June 1960 – July 1961)
- Avraham Adan (July 1961 – January 1963)
- Herzl Shafir (January 1963 – December 1964)
- Shlomo Lahat (January 1965 – May 1966)
- Shmuel Gonen (June 1966 – June 1969)
- Ya'akov Even (June 1969 – June 1971)
- Gabriel Amir (June 1971 – September 1972)
- Avigdor Ben-Gal (September 1972 – February 1974)
- Ori Orr (February 1974 – December 1975)
- Avigdor Kahalani (December 1975 – October 1977)
- Yossi Ben-Hanan (October 1977 – June 1979)
- Nati Golan (June 1979 – March 1981)
- Eitan Kauli (Keinan) (March 1981 – September 1982)
- Meir Zamir (September 1982 – February 1984)
- Amir Noy (May 1984 – September 1985)
- Avraham Palant (September 1985 – May 1987)
- Efraim Laor (May 1987 – November 1988)
- Dubik Rosenthal (Tal) (November 1988 – July 1990)
- Zvika Gendelman (July 1990 – January 1992)
- Yitzhak Harel (January 1992 – October 1993)
- Gershon HaCohen (October 1993 – August 1995)
- Dan Biton (August 1995 – August 1997)
- Shmulik Rosenthal (August 1997 – April 1999)
- Ya'akov Ayash (April 1999 – July 2001)
- Halutzi Rudoy (July 2001 – August 2003)
- Eyal Zamir (August 2003 – September 2005)
- Amnon Eshel (Asulin) (September 2005 – August 2007)
- Ro'i Elkavetz (August 2007 – May 2009)
- Ya'akov Banjo (May 2009 – July 2011)
- Oded Basyuk (July 2011 – June 2013)
- Nadav Lotan (June 2013 – July 2015)
- Dan Noyman (July 2015 – August 2017)
- Roman Gofman (August 2017 – August 2019)
- Audi Tzur (August 2019 – October 2021)
- Yeftah Norkin (October 2021 – July 2023)
- Elad Tzuri (July 2023 – present)
