= Mike Schwartz (basketball) =

American-Israeli basketball player and coach

Mike Schwartz מיכה שוורץ
Personal information
- Born: March 17, 1949 (age 77)
- Listed height: 1.94 m (6 ft 4 in)
- Position: Power forward

Michael "Mike or Micah" Schwartz (Hebrew: מיכה שוורץ; born March 17, 1949) is an American-Israeli former basketball player and coach. He played the power forward position. He played and coached in the Israeli Basketball Premier League, and played for the Israel national basketball team

== Biography ==
Schwartz is 1.94 m (6 ft 4 in) tall.

He played in the Israeli Basketball Premier League from 1967 to 1980 for Maccabi Tel Aviv and Upper Gallilee (which Schwartz later coached). Schwartz competed for the Israel national basketball team in the 1968 European Olympic Qualifying Tournament for Men, 1971 European Championship for Men, 1972 Pre-Olympic Basketball Tournament, and 1973 Universiade.

He lived in Haifa, Israel, early in his life, is married to Racheli Schwartz, and they live in Kibbutz Hulata, Israel. Schwartz's son Gal played basketball in the Israeli National League.
