= Israel Ziv =

Israeli general

- ישראל זיו
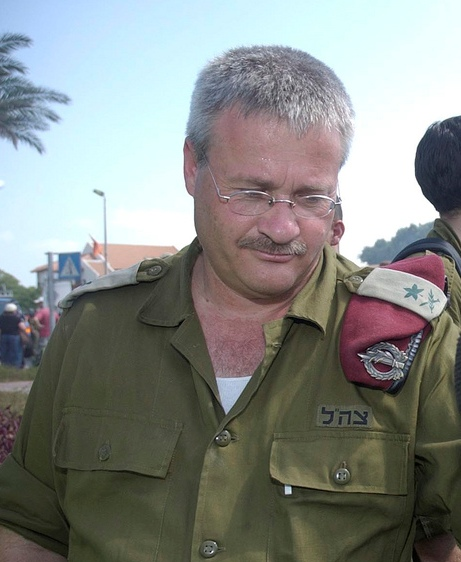
- Ziv in 2005
- Born: 1957 (age 68–69)
- Military career
- Allegiance: Israel Defense Forces
- Service years: 1975–2005
- Rank: Aluf
- Unit: Paratroopers Brigade
- Commands: 50 paratroop battalion, reserve paratrooper brigade, the 35th Paratroopers Brigade, head of the Paratroopers and Infantry Corps, Gaza Division, Operations Directorate
- Conflicts: Operation Litani; 1982 Lebanon War; South Lebanon conflict First Intifada; South Lebanon conflict (1985–2000); Second Intifada; Gaza war

Israel Ziv (Hebrew: ישראל זיו; born 1957) is an Israeli retired general who held several prominent posts including the head of the Israel Defense Force's Operations Directorate. During the Gaza war, Ziv emerged as a symbol of individual resistance and initiative, engaging directly in conflict zones, organizing military efforts, and spearheading civilian defense initiatives amidst a Hamas incursion.

== Military career ==
Ziv was drafted into the Israeli Defence Forces in 1975. He volunteered as a paratrooper in the Paratroopers Brigade. He served as a soldier and a squad leader and took part in various raids against armed Palestinian organizations and camps in Lebanon, including Operation Litani. He became an infantry officer after completing Officer Candidate School and returning to the Paratroopers Brigade as a platoon leader. During the 1982 Lebanon War, he served as a company commander and led the 35th Paratroopers Brigade's Reconnaissance company during heavy fighting against PLO operatives and the Syrian army. Ziv led 101st "Peten" (Elapidae) paratroop battalion and the 35th Paratroopers Brigade in counter-guerrilla operations in South Lebanon. He later served as head of the Paratroopers and Infantry Corps and commanded the Gaza Division during the Second Intifada.

In 2003, Ziv was appointed head of the IDF's Operations Directorate.

== Sanctions ==
In December 2018, the U.S. Treasury imposed sanctions on Ziv and accused him of using an agricultural consultancy as cover for weapons sales to South Sudan. The sanctions were lifted in 2020.

== 2023 War ==
During the initial stages of the Gaza war, Israel Ziv, who had already retired, became notably active in responding to a substantial attack from Hamas, which included a barrage of rocket fire and gunmen crossing into Israeli territory. Upon learning of the incursion and resulting significant civilian and military turmoil, Ziv, equipped with a nine-millimeter pistol, proceeded towards the conflict zone, organizing soldiers, supervising evacuations, and participating in combat. His actions, widely reported by Israeli media, subsequently transformed him into a notable figure representing individual initiative, particularly in the context of what some observers and Ziv himself viewed as a failure by the government and military to sufficiently safeguard civilians.

Ziv, who has been openly critical of the government under Benjamin Netanyahu, asserting it to be "totally paralyzed" and arguing it has pursued policies that have both divided Israelis and undermined national security, remained actively engaged in various aspects of Israeli civil society and governance amid the crisis. This included leading initiatives to secure funding for victims and their families, and liaising with military and security officials to strengthen civilian defense mechanisms. Concurrently, with public trust in the military's protective capabilities reportedly waning, Ziv initiated and led efforts to equip and organize civilians, including utilizing the expertise of retired generals and former soldiers, to formulate community defense squads nationwide, with a particular focus on regions proximate to the Gaza border.

== Personal life ==
Ziv holds a bachelor's degree in Economics from the Bar Ilan University and a masters in political science from the Haifa University. He is a graduate of the National Security College and a graduate of the executive management course from Harvard. He is marred to Idit and has 3 children. He lives in Sde Warburg.
