= Herzl Shafir =

Israeli general (1929–2021)

Herzl Shekhterman Shafir
- A visit by the officers of the IDF's Armoured Corps to the Shevach school for boys in Tel-Aviv. Shafir on the right. November 21, 1954
- Native name: הרצל שפיר
- Born: July 10, 1929; Tel Aviv, Mandatory Palestine
- Died: September 26, 2021 (aged 92)
- Allegiance: Israel
- Branch: Palmach; Haganah; Israel Defense Forces; Israel Police
- Service years: 1947 - December 31, 1980
- Rank: Aluf (Military); Rav Nitzav (Police)
- Commands: 460th Brigade; 7th Brigade; Assistant Head of Operations Directorate; Manpower Directorate 1972–1974; Southern Command 1976-1978
- Conflicts: 1948 Arab–Israeli War; Sinai War; Six-Day War; War of Attrition; Yom Kippur War
- Other work: General Commissioner of Israel Police

Herzl Shekhterman Shafir (Hebrew: הרצל שפיר; July 10, 1929 - September 26, 2021) was an Israel Defense Forces Major General, head of the Manpower Directorate, head of Israel's Southern Command, and later assistant head of the Operations Directorate. He subsequently served as the 7th General Commissioner of Israel Police.

== Youth and military service ==
Herzl Shafir was born in Tel Aviv in 1929. His parents were Tzvi and Miriam (née Friedman) Shekhterman; Tzvi was originally from Stara Syniava in present-day Ukraine. Herzl was the younger brother of Avraham Shekhterman, a former member of the Knesset for Gahal and Likud between 1969 and 1977. Shafir attended the Tachkemoni School at Mikveh Israel and the Maritime School at the Technion in Haifa. In 1947 Shafir enlisted in the Palmach and took part in numerous activities with its third battalion, including the assault on Metzudat Koach.

After joining the Israel Defense Forces, Shafir completed an officers' course and served as an instructor at the officers academy. In 1950 he was discharged from regular service in the army and began serving as an infantry company commander with the reserves. That same year, at the age of 21, he became the first reserve officer to complete the battalion commanders course. He returned to permanent service the following year and was appointed operations officer of a reserve brigade. Between 1951 and 1952 he served as the operations officer of Southern Command and commanded a reconnaissance company. After transferring to the Armored Corps, Shafir led an armor company and went on to become the corps' operations officer. During the 1956 Sinai War, Shafir was the operations officer of the 77th Division.

In 1959 Shafir attended the British Army's Staff College at Camberley. After returning to Israel he was appointed commander of the armor school, commander of the 7th Armored Brigade and deputy commander of the Armored Corps. He undertook undergraduate studies in Geography and Economics at the Hebrew University.

Prior to the Six-Day War Shafir was appointed deputy commander and chief of staff to Israel Tal at the 84th Division. After the war he served as chief of staff of Central Command and in 1969 he was appointed assistant head of the Operations Directorate. In 1972 he was given the emergency posting of commander of the 143rd Division. In September of the same year he was appointed head of the Manpower Directorate and was promoted to Major General. He served in that role during the Yom Kippur War. In April 1974 he was appointed head of the General Staff Department, and in March 1976 the commander of the Southern Command. In 1978, towards the end of his military service, Shafir want on study leave in the United States.

== Israeli police commissioner office ==
On January 1, 1980, Shafir was appointed General Commissioner of the Israel Police. As commissioner, Shafir introduced various policies and protocols that were widely used in the IDF in order to improve the quality of serving police. On December 31, 1980, Shafir was dismissed from his job by the Interior Minister Yosef Burg after allegations of misconduct. Yosef Burg accused Shafir of planting a false story in the press in order to help his investigation of Religious Affairs Minister Aharon Abuhatzira, who was suspected of taking bribes. Yosef Burg accused Shafir, claiming he was turning Israel into a police state and using "a Goebbels tactic", referencing Joseph Goebbels, Hitler's propaganda chief.

According to Shafir, the layoffs were made against the police handling of corruption of elected officials from his party's Minister of the Interior and the police. The case became known as "Peach Bag". "Peach Bag" never matured into specific charges and attribute this to the dismissal of police commissioner Shafir. Shafir eventually admitted that he had leaked false information to the press on the investigation of the government minister, however he rejected all other allegations.

== Public duties ==
Since retiring from the police, Shafir served as chairman and member of several public committees, including:

- Shafir Committee – appointed by the Chief of Staff Ehud Barak in 1992, to examine the optimal utilization of military personnel and recommend ways to reduce the active reserve duty days and shortening of compulsory service in the future.
- Shafir Committee – appointed by the Environmental Protection Minister Gideon Ezra to examine the preparation and processing of hazardous materials during emergencies.
