= Hulata =

Place in northern Israel

Hulata: חולתה (Hebrew)
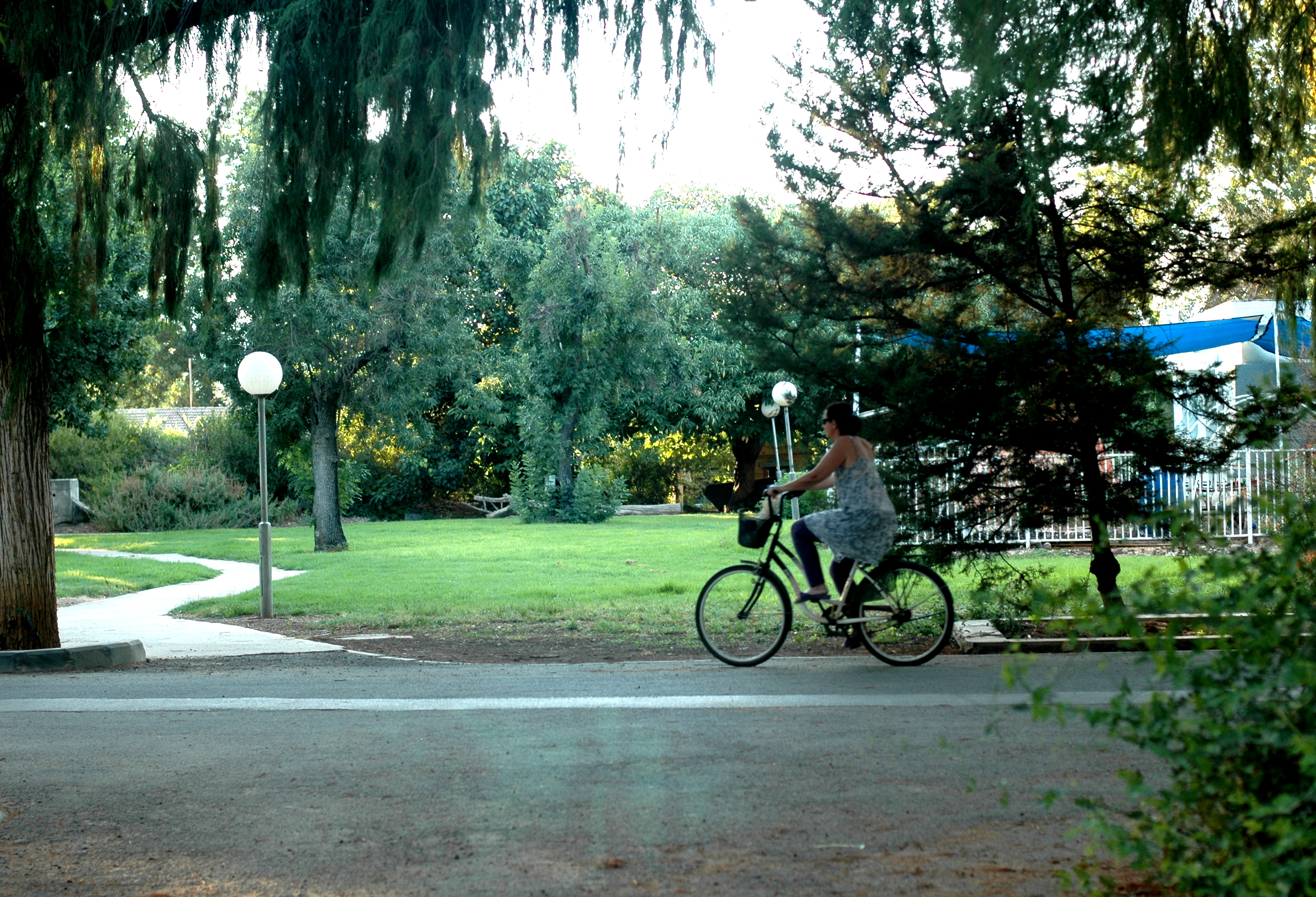

- Location within Northeast Israel Location within Israel
- Coordinates: 33°3′6.11″N 35°36′34.91″E
- Country: Israel
- District: Northern
- Subdistrict: Safed
- Council: Upper Galilee
- Affiliation: Kibbutz Movement
- Founded: 1937
- Founder: HaMahanot HaOlim members
- Population (2024): 773

Hulata (Hebrew: חולתה) is a kibbutz in northern Israel. Located in the Hula Valley, it falls under the jurisdiction of Upper Galilee Regional Council. In 2024 it had a population of 773.

== History ==
The kibbutz was established in 1937 as a fishing village by a gar'in of HaMahanot HaOlim youth group members. It was named for its location in the Hula Valley. After the draining of the Hula swamps, the residents began working in agriculture.

The documentary film Kibbutz traces the stages of grieving and disillusionment that followed Hulata's economic collapse and privatization.

Hulata is a pluralistic kibbutz that accepts members from all backgrounds, both religiously observant and not.

== Gallery ==
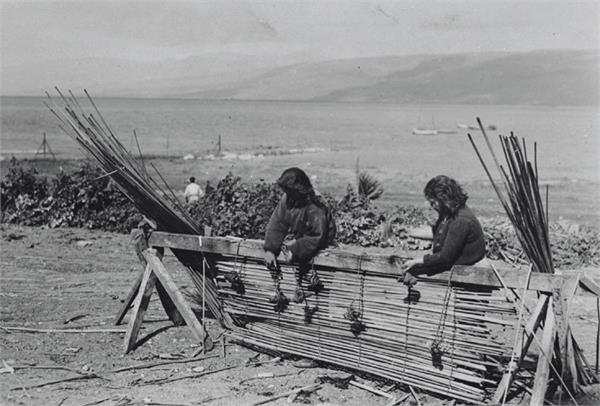
Young women in Hulata weaving mats in 1940

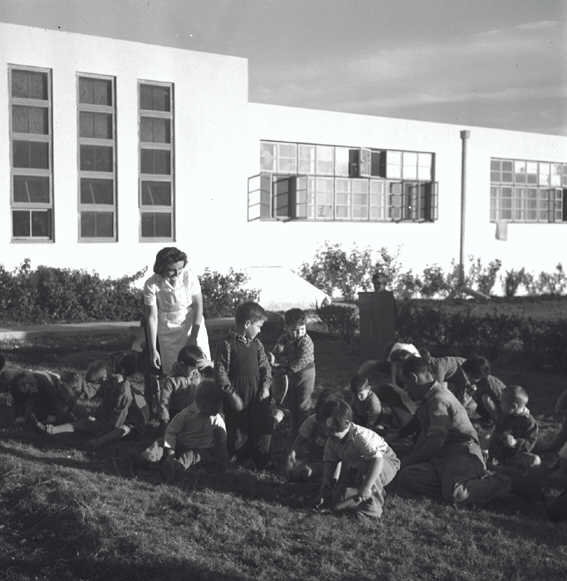
Hulata in 1945

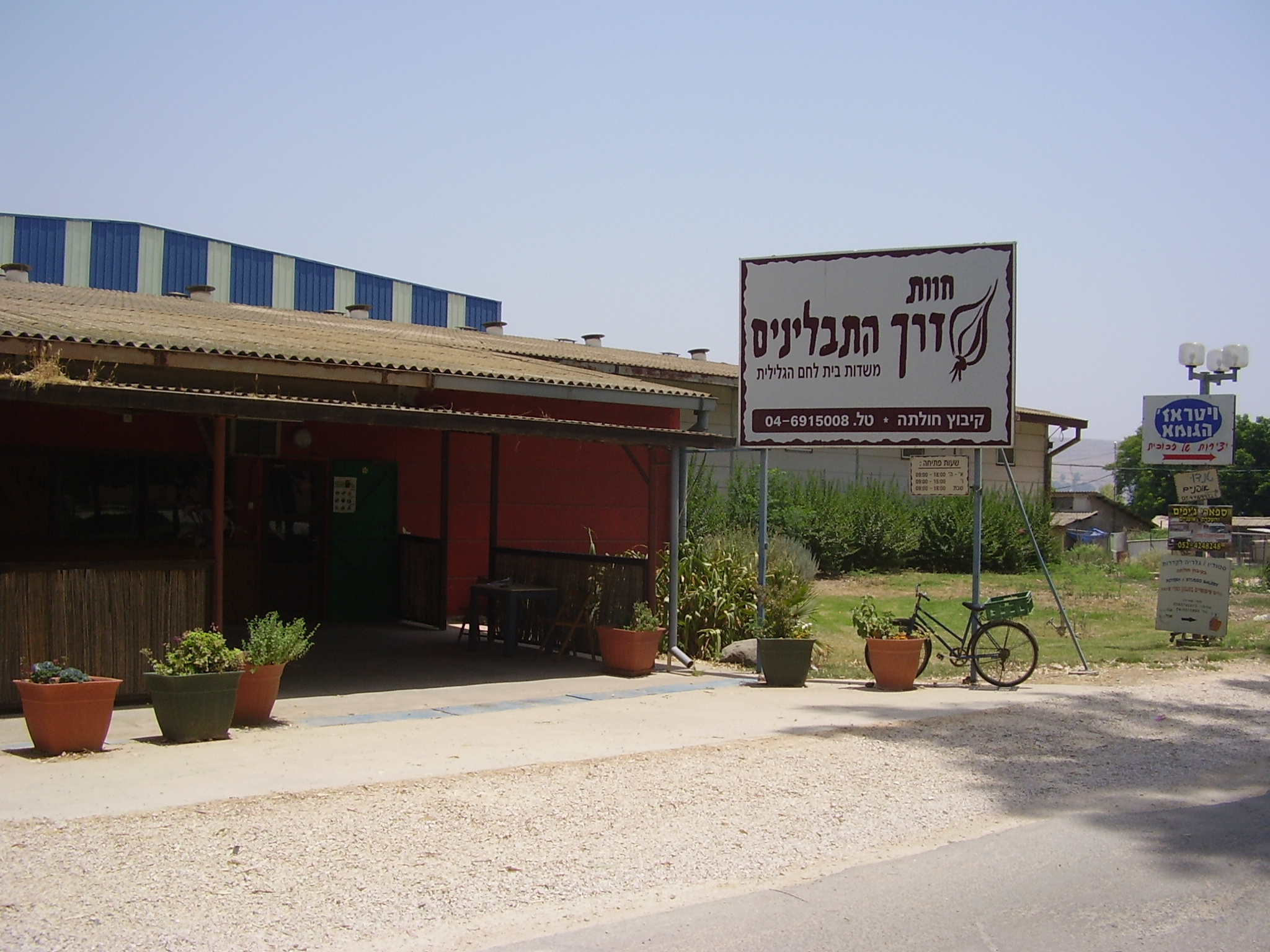
Spice market at Hulata in 2016

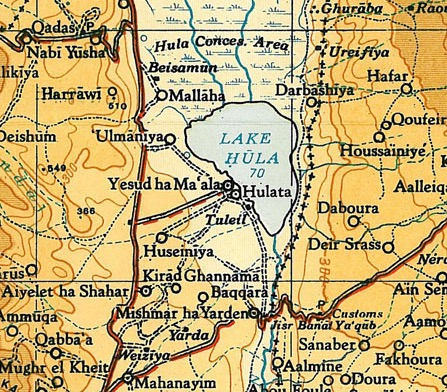
Hulata. Survey of Palestine. 1945. Scale 1:250,000

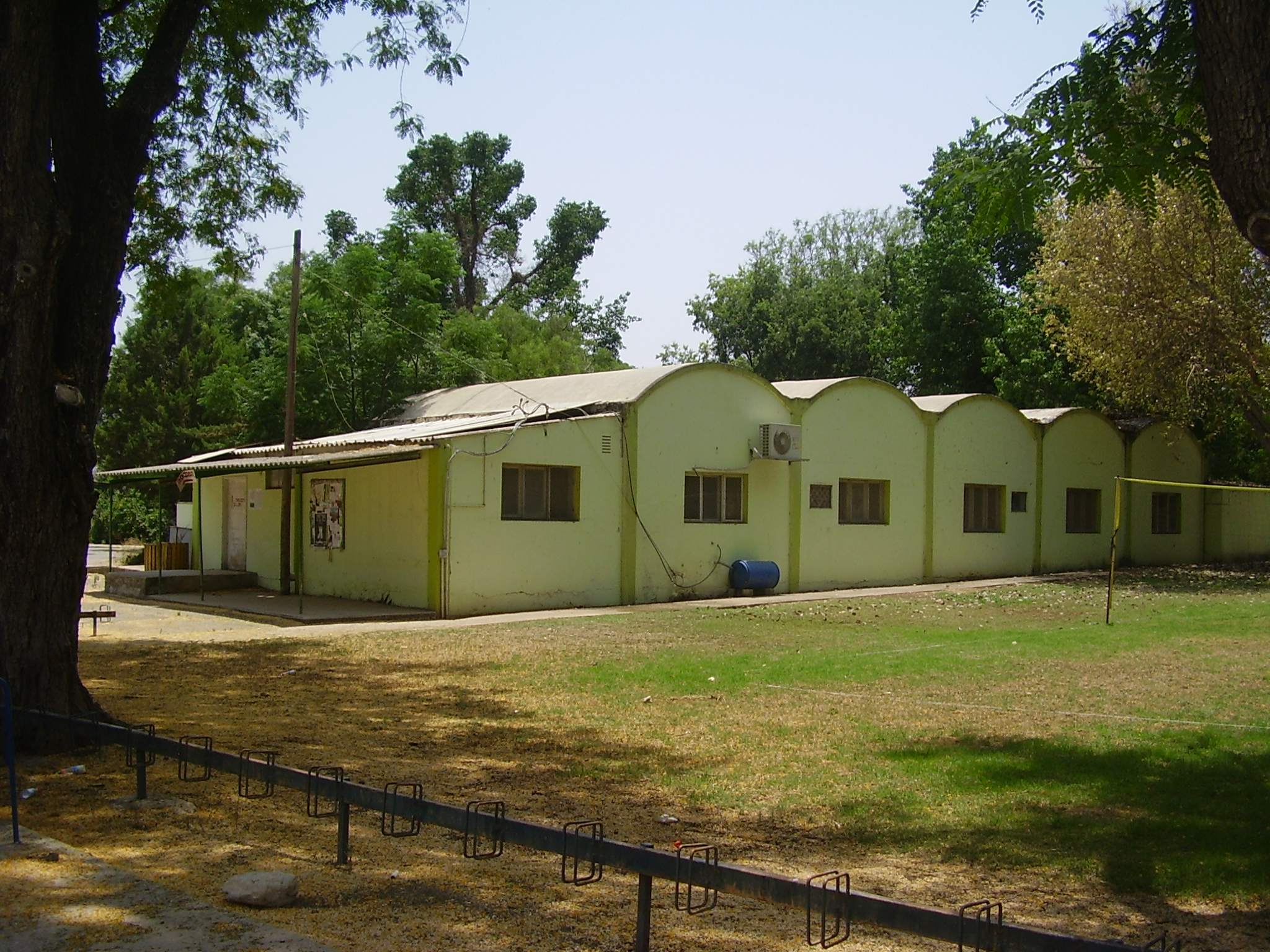
Former communal dining room

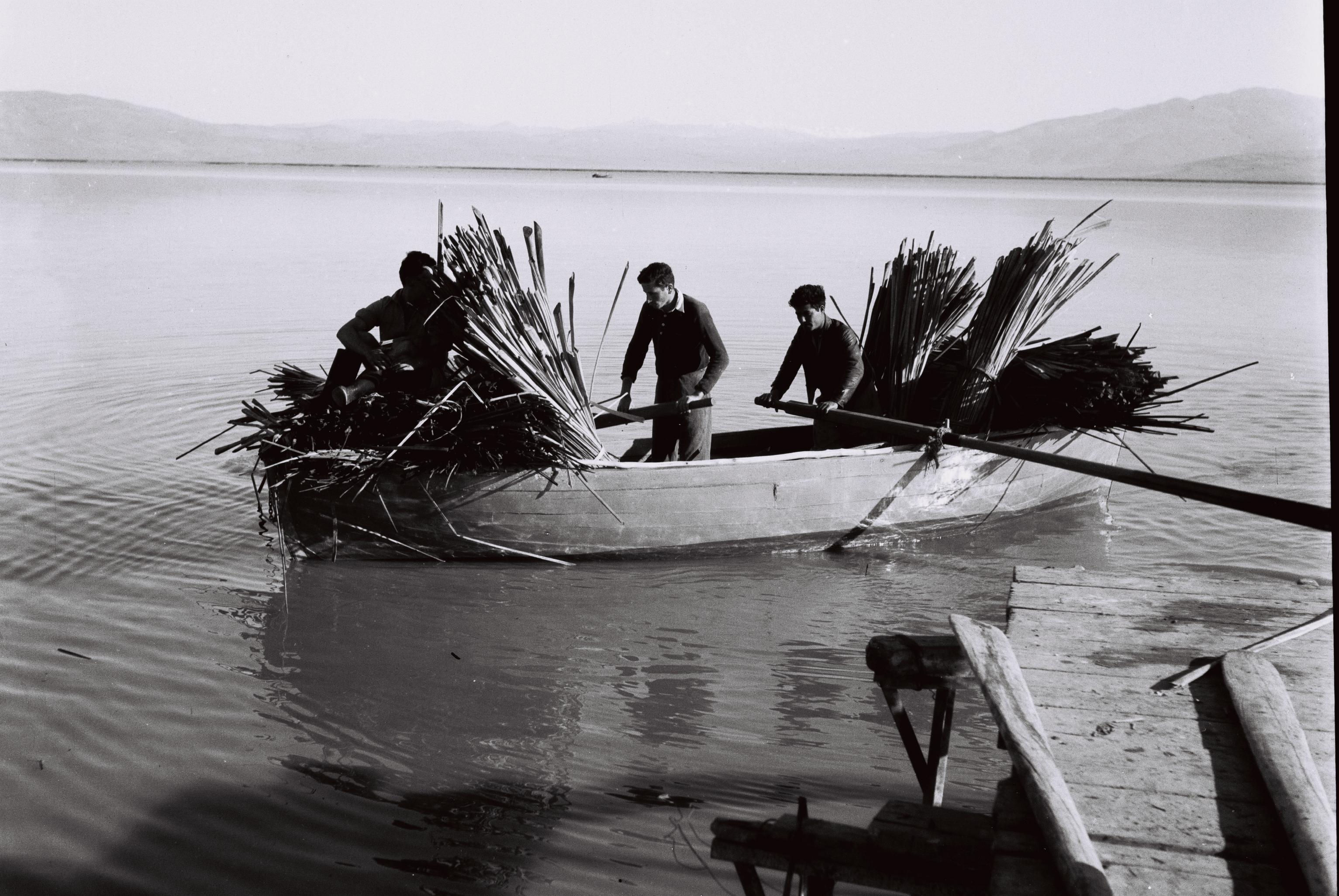
Members of the kibbutz, bringing in reeds cut on the northern shore of Lake Hula in 1940

== Notable residents ==
- Tal Russo
- Mike Schwartz (born 1949), American-Israeli basketball player and coach
- Iftach Spector
