= Yaron Finkelman =

Israeli brigadier general (born 1975)

- ירון פינקלמן
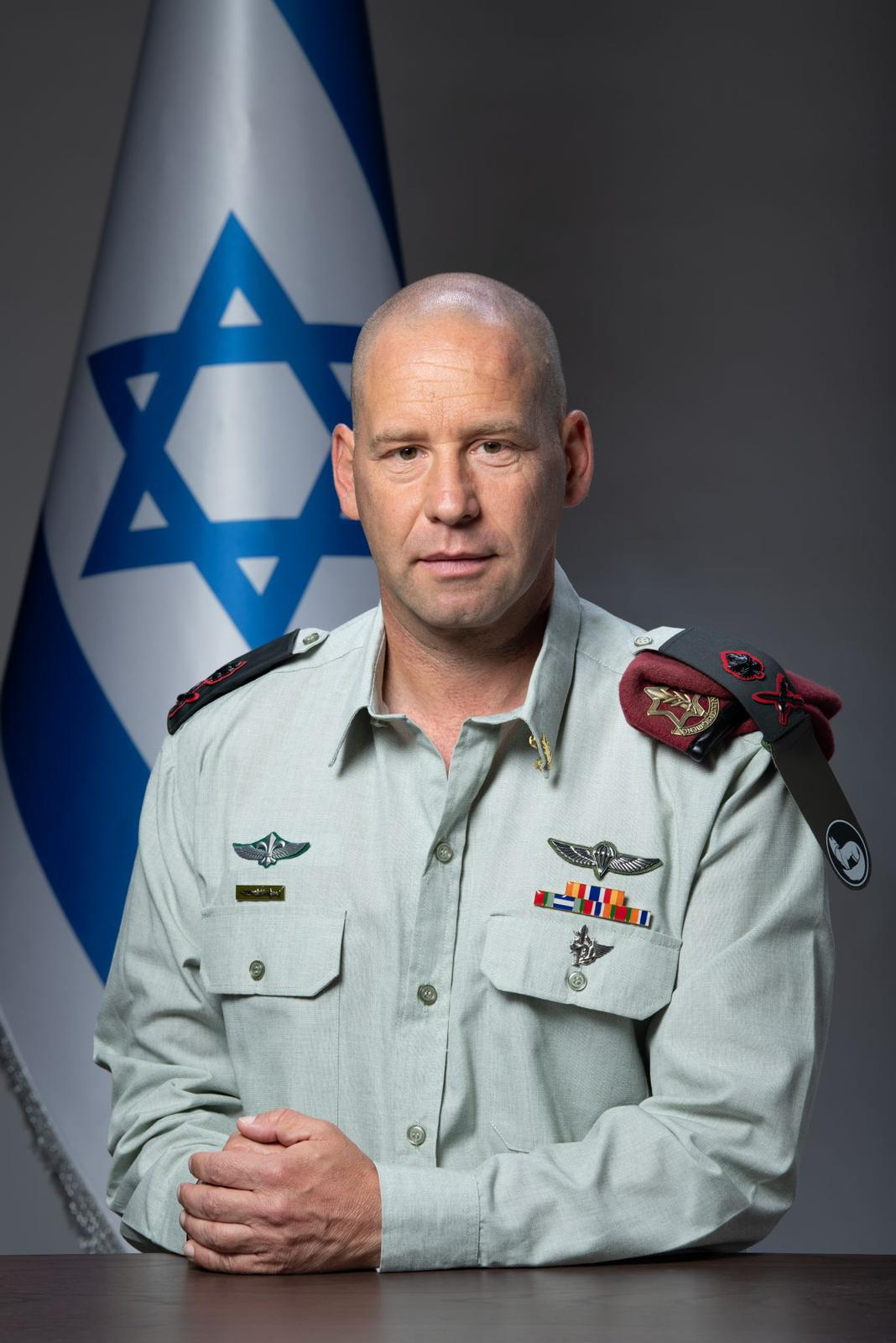
- Official portrait, 2023
- Born: April 25, 1975 (age 51); Ra'anana, Israel
- Military career
- Allegiance: Israel
- Branch: Israel Defense Forces
- Service years: 1993–2025
- Rank: Major general
- Unit: Paratroopers Brigade
- Commands: 35th paratroopers Brigade's Reconnaissance battalion, reserve Paratrooper Brigade, Regional Brigade in the Gaza Division, Givati Brigade, 98th Paratroopers Division, Southern Command
- Conflicts: Security Zone in Lebanon Campaign; First Intifada; Second Intifada; Operation Defensive Shield; Second Lebanon War; Operation Cast Lead; Operation Pillar of Defense; Operation Protective Edge; Operation Swords of Iron

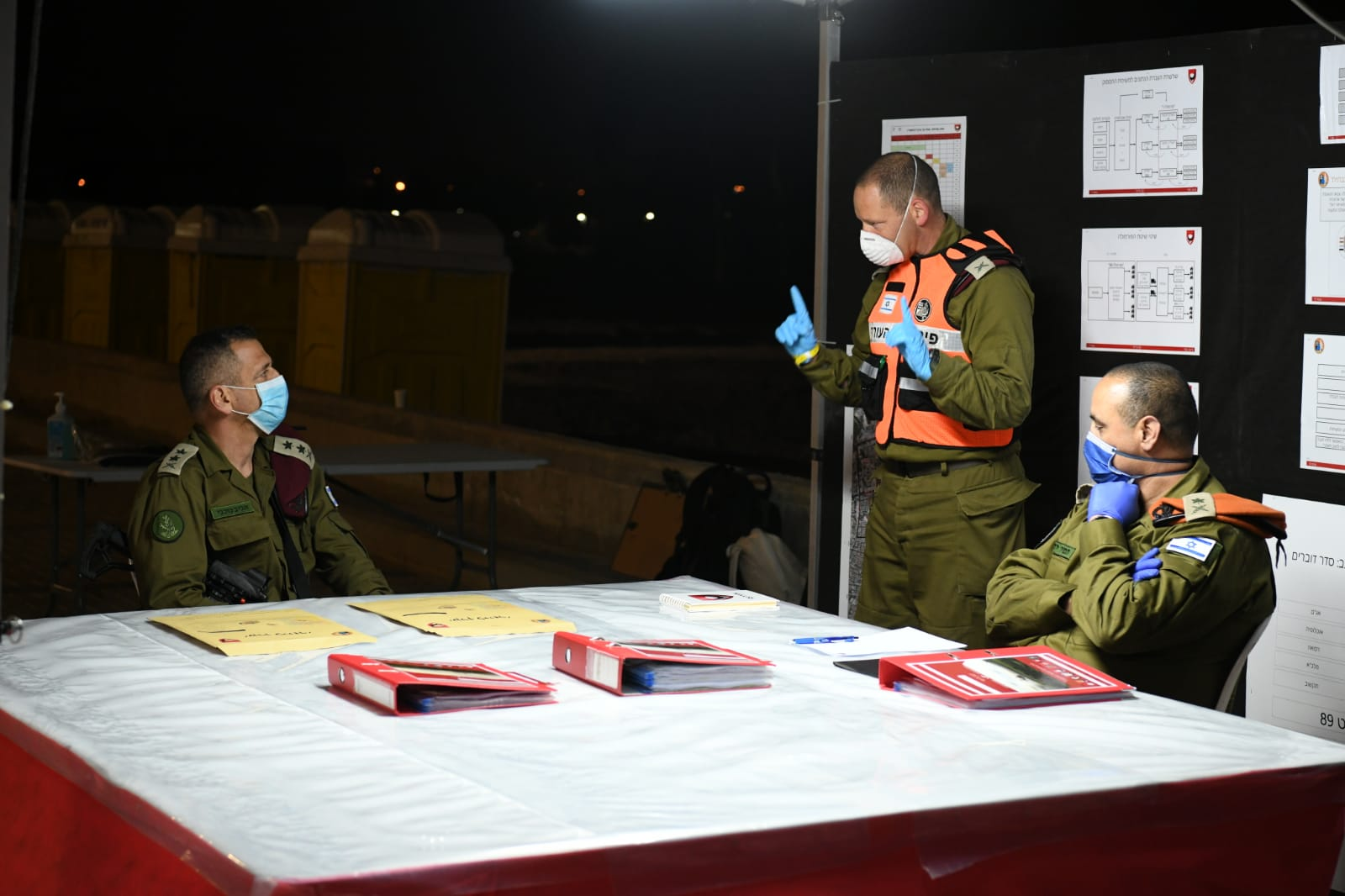
Finkelman (center) explaining to Home Front Command Commander Tamir Yadai (right) and Chief of Staff Aviv Kochavi (left) about the food distribution operation by the Fire Formation in Bnei Brak during the COVID-19 pandemic, 2020

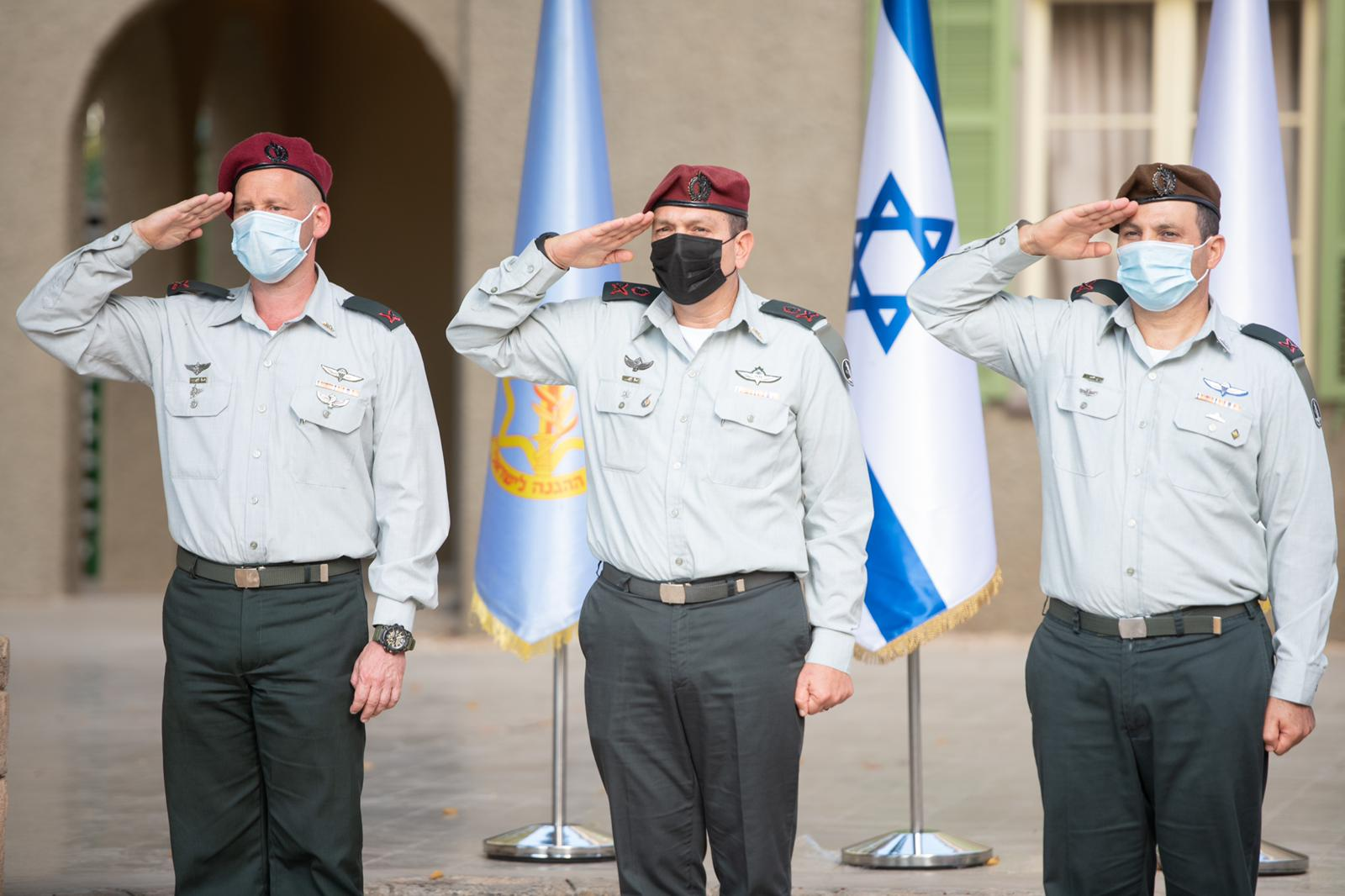
Finkelman (left) at the ceremony of his appointment as Head of the Operations Division, October 2020. Outgoing division head Yaniv Assur on the right and Operations Directorate Commander Aharon Haliva in the center

Yaron Finkelman (Hebrew: ירון פינקלמן; born April 25, 1975) is a former Israeli major general who commanded the Southern Command of the Israel Defense Forces until March 2025. Previously, he served as the head of the Operations Division at the Operations Directorate, Commander of the Fire Formation, Commander of the Givati Brigade, Commander of the Northern Brigade in the Gaza Strip, Commander of the Fire Arrows Formation, and Commander of the Paratroopers Reconnaissance Battalion.

Three months after assuming the role of Major General, the October 7 attacks occurred, marking the beginning of Operation Iron Swords. Since then, Finkelman has commanded the battle in the Gaza Strip against Hamas and their allies.

== Biography ==
Finkelman enlisted in the IDF in November 1993, volunteering for Unit 669. He completed basic training with the Paratroopers Brigade, a medic course, and Unit 669 training. After dropping out of the unit, he was assigned in August 1994 to the 401st Reconnaissance Battalion. He completed training as a combat soldier, the Infantry Commanders Course, and the Infantry Officers Course. Upon completing the course, he returned to the reconnaissance battalion and was appointed a team commander. He later served as a company commander in the Haruv Battalion. Subsequently, he was appointed commander of the reconnaissance battalion of the 500th Brigade, holding the position from 1999–2001. He then served as the operations officer of the Maglan Unit. Later, he was appointed deputy commander of the 890th Battalion, serving during the Second Intifada.

In 2005, he was promoted to the rank of Lieutenant Colonel and appointed as the head of the Chief of Staff's office under Dan Halutz, serving in this position during the 2006 Lebanon War. He completed his term in 2007. He then commanded the Paratroopers Reconnaissance Battalion from 2007 to 2009, leading it in combat against Palestinian terrorism in the West Bank, as well as in Operation Double Challenge, and Operation Cast Lead, both in the Gaza Strip.

In March 2011, he was promoted to the rank of Colonel and appointed commander of the Fire Arrows Formation, commanding it during Operation Pillar of Defense. He completed his role in June 2013. On July 21, 2013, he was appointed commander of the Northern Brigade in the Gaza Strip (Gefen Brigade), leading it during Operation Protective Edge. He served in this position until April 29, 2015. On June 21, 2015, he was appointed commander of the Givati Brigade, completing his tenure on July 20, 2017.

On August 20, 2017, the Chief of Staff, Gadi Eizenkot, issued a reprimand to Finkelman following the theft of thirty-three M16 rifles in May 2017 from the armory of the Sde Teiman base in the south, which was under his responsibility as the commander of the Givati Brigade. In his reprimand, Eizenkot stated, "This is a failure in the security system that does not meet the standards required in the IDF."

On November 16, 2017, he was promoted to the rank of Brigadier General and appointed commander of the Fire Formation. During his tenure, the Ghost Unit was established, and alongside the David's Sling Formation, both were placed under his command within the Fire Formation. In April 2020, he commanded division forces in a food distribution operation in Bnei Brak during the COVID-19 pandemic. He served in this role until August 9, 2020. On October 13, 2020, he was appointed head of the Operations Division at the Operations Directorate, serving in this capacity during Operation Guardian of the Walls and Operation Breaking Dawn. He held this position until October 3, 2022. In early 2023, he was invited by the incoming Chief of Staff, Herzi Halevi, to lead one of the strategic planning teams formed to address topics Halevi planned to tackle during his tenure.

On 29 June 2023, he was promoted to the rank of Major General, and on July 9, he assumed his position as commander of the Southern Command. On 21 January 2025, Finkelman announced that he would resign on 6 March 2025 over the failures of the Southern Command during the October 7 attacks in 2023. Yaniv Asor replaced him as the head of the Southern Command.

== Operation Swords of Iron ==
The day after the October 7 attacks in Israel, Finkelman joined the battle at Be'eri after managing it the entire previous day from the command headquarters. The battle continued until Monday afternoon. In response to the attack, Israel launched Operation Iron Swords, during which Finkelman commanded the ground maneuver carried out by command forces in the Gaza Strip.

Finkelman advanced a maneuver involving three combat divisions in northern Gaza, bypassing the defense systems of Izz ad-Din al-Qassam Brigades, connecting along the coastal road in Gaza, and taking control of Shifa Hospital. In December, under his direction, the maneuver in the southern part of the Strip commenced, leading to the Battle of Khan Yunis, during which IDF forces developed combat tactics both above and below ground. The campaign led by Finkelman had to consider several complicating factors: the presence of hundreds of hostages held by Hamas and other terrorist factions, the large civilian population, the entrenchment of terrorist factions within it, the extensive tunnel network of terrorist organizations within the Strip, and other variables. Under his command, the IDF conducted the most intense maneuver since Operation Cast Lead, following decades of decline in the capabilities of the Ground Forces, and did so with a higher degree of inter-branch coordination and cooperation than before. The gradual combat method was also used for the first time.

On February 11, 2024, he commanded IDF forces from the command center – Shayetet 13, 7th Brigade, Division 98, and the Air Force – during the hostage rescue operation in Rafah in Operation Golden Hand. Similarly, on June 8, he commanded Operation Summer Seeds (later renamed Operation Arnon), where four hostages were rescued alive from the Nuseirat camp. After the operational takeover of territory, the command employed a "lawnmower" approach—gradually clearing the area of terrorists while reducing the number of forces deployed in the sector. Among the series of operations, the most notable in terms of media exposure was Operation Local Surgery in late March 2024.

In March 2024, Finkelman conducted a war crimes investigation into the unauthorized demolition of al-Isra University in Gaza. Upon completing his inquiry, he presented his findings to IDF Chief of Staff Herzi Halevi, which resulted in the official reprimand of Brigadier General Barak Hiram. On April 4, 2024, the Chief of Staff, Herzi Halevi, decided to issue him a reprimand due to the death of workers at the World Central Kitchen. On May 5, Finkelman gave the opening order in the Battle of Rafah, and in September, the decisive defeat of the Rafah Brigade was completed. The IDF then concentrated its operational efforts within the Strip along the Philadelphi Route (162nd "Steel" Division), along the Netzarim Corridor (252nd Division), and established a buffer zone several kilometers deep into the Strip along the Israel-Gaza barrier. In October 2024, during a chance encounter, command forces killed the leader of Hamas, Yahya Sinwar, at Tel al-Sultan in Rafah.

On January 21, 2025, Finkelman announced in a letter to Halevi that he intended to resign from the IDF due to his role in the military's failure during the October 7 attacks; Halevi announced on the same day that he would also resign from the IDF for the same reason.

On November 23, 2025, IDF chief of staff Eyal Zamir dismissed Finkelman from reservist duty due to his role in Israel's failures on October 7.

== Personal life ==
Finkelman is married and a father of three. He holds a bachelor's degree in Middle Eastern studies and political science, as well as a master's degree in diplomacy and security, both from Tel Aviv University. He is a graduate of the senior leadership program of the Wexner Foundation, Class of 2023.
