= Malat (IDF) =

Malat (Hebrew המרכז למבצעי תודעה) (מל"ת) is an Israel Defense Forces Operations Directorate unit which specializes in psychological warfare.

== History ==
Malat was reactivated between 2004 and 2005 following five years of reduced operations and comprises intelligence officers and civilian psychologists headed by a senior Colonel, with an emphasis on Arabic speakers.

As the Military Intelligence Directorate opposed incorporating psychological warfare in its operations, the unit is subordinate to the head of the Operations Branch of the IDF general staff, or "professionally guided," as the arrangement was officially titled by the head of Aman, which in effect means it is a body with greater autonomy than its predecessors.

In 2005, a senior IDF officer criticized the reactivation of Malat as a "white elephant" and wasting "time and resources [by attempting to] accompany every military operation with [its own] psychological warfare program."
