= Henryk Grynberg =

Polish writer and actor (born 1936)

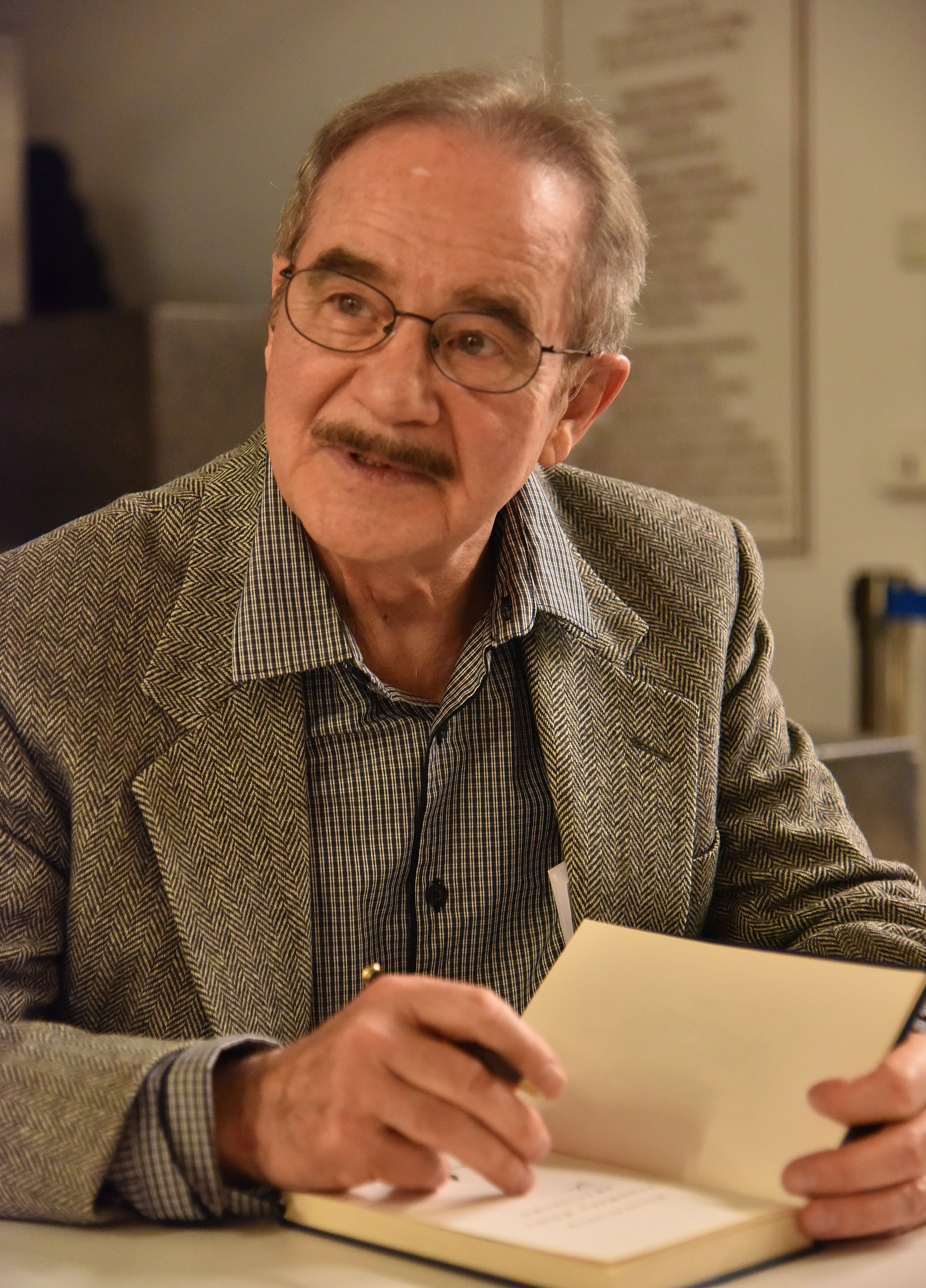
Henryk Grynberg

Henryk Grynberg (born 1936 in Warsaw) is a Polish writer and actor who survived the Nazi occupation. He is a novelist, short-story writer, poet, playwright and essayist who had authored more than thirty books of prose and poetry and two dramas. Grynberg, known as the “chronicler of the fate of the Polish Jews”, tackled in his writings the Holocaust experience and the post-Holocaust trauma.

== Personal survival ==
Grynberg and his mother were the only survivors from their family. He spent the years 1942 to 1944 in hiding places, saved from German Nazis by the Polish families. After the war, he lived in Łódź and Warsaw. In the early 1990s Grynberg returned to Poland with film maker Paweł Łoziński. The latter filmed Grynberg as he interviewed people in his native village in search of what happened to his father Abram Grynberg during the war. The documentary was released in 1992 under the name "Miejsce urodzenia" (Birthplace).

== Post-War ==
On 11 October 1956 he signed as an undercover agent of the 1st Department (Intelligence) of Polish Agency for Internal Security - code name "reporter" as documented by Polish Historical Institute (or IPN), but the report in "Życie Warszawy" of 1 December 2006 is distorted and unreliable. Grynberg was pressured by the SB, denied that he informed on any one, and reportedly revealed his recruitment to the FBI. See Ted Lipien

From Henryk Grynberg: I did sign a cooperation agreement with Polish intelligence (not military intelligence) on October 11, 1956 and received a one-time assignment to bring to the next meeting written characteristics (in Polish opinie) of three fellow students (two of them Jewish), no more than a page each. I presented those three persons as good intelligent students loyal to the state ideology and those were the only "reports" I was asked to do or have done in writing or otherwise. My contacts with the Polish intelligence or whatever secret services lasted no more than five months during which time I did nothing else for them. A document in my files at the IPN says, "His recruitment assumed future utilization in Israel and subsequently in the USA. After finishing his studies, Grynberg showed unwillingness to further collaboration. For this reason, the 1st Dep. resigned from further contacts with him." That ultimate "unwilingness" I expressed in 1959 when an intelligence agent wanted me to take with me a letter to Israel and I refused. I revealed my recruitment – or rather attempt at recruitment – to the FBI when applying for U.S. citizenship and for a sensitive position with U.S. Information Agency (which I held for 20 years). The note "Collaboration with Communists," so prominently placed, directs undue attention to a very short and meaningless episode in my biography.

== The beginnings of a writer ==
In 1959, Grynberg graduated from Warsaw University with a master's degree in journalism. As an actor, Grynberg had connections with the Jewish Theatre in Warsaw. It was during this time when he started publishing prose and poetry.

While the Jewish State Theater company was on tour in the United States in late 1967, he refused to return to Poland. This defection was an act of protest against the communist regime's anti-Jewish propaganda, and against the censorship of his writings.

In 1971, after two years of attending graduate studies at UCLA, Grynberg received an M.A. in Russian Literature and moved to Washington, D.C., where Grynberg worked for the U.S. Information Agency (particularly for Voice in America) for a period of twenty years.

== Works and achievements ==
Grynberg published his first story in 1959, which was later included in his debut collection, The Antigone Crew in 1963. In his works - written both while in Poland and in the United States – Grynberg narrated the stories of “those who died during the war and of those who survived to live afterwards in Lodz, Warsaw, or New York, struggling to come to terms with their own memory and with the fact that others did not remember.” His works were described as characteristically abundant in “biographical and autobiographical material”, where his Jewish protagonists are the narrators whose personal experiences were “supplemented by the experiences of other ‘survivors’”.

Grynberg was a recipient of all major Polish literary prizes, and of the 2002 Koret Jewish Book Award. He also contributed to the Polish press and English-language journals. His essays and articles appeared in publications such as the Commentary, the Midstream, and the Soviet-Jewish Affairs in London. Grynberg’s books have been published in English translation, namely novels, Child of the Shadows (Vallentine Mitchell, London, 1969) - reedited as "The Jewish War and the Victory" (Northwestern University Press, 2001); the sequel, The Victory (Northwestern University Press, 1993); documentary prose, Children of Zion (Northwestern University Press, 1997), translated by Jacqueline Mitchell, and "Drohobycz, Drohobycz and Other Stories" (Penguin Books, 2002) translated by Alicia Nitecki, edited by Theodosia Robertson.

Grynberg's books were also translated into the French, German, Italian, Hebrew, Dutch, as well as Czech, Hungarian, and Swedish languages.

Grynberg's books: "Drohobycz, Drohobycz," "Memorbuch," "Monolog polsko-żydowski" ("Polish-Jewish Monolog") and "Uchodźcy" ("Refugees") were nominated for Poland's Nike Literary Award.

== Statements on contemporary antisemitism ==
In July 2024, in an article in the Israel Journal of Foreign Affairs entitled "Worse than Again", Grynberg lamented the recrudescence of virulent antisemitism camouflaged as anti-Zionism. "Is it happening again?" he asked and answered: "No, it is worse. Antisemites of the 1930s weren’t always aware of the consequences of what they were saying or doing, while our contemporaries know and understand all too well. Back then, most of them couldn’t even imagine that a multimillion-strong ethnic group could be demonized and systematically annihilated by such advanced and seemingly cultured and civilized segments of humankind. In the 1930s, no one chanted 'Gas the Jews!'"

In that same text, Grynberg went on to claim that even during the 1968 antisemitic campaign in Communist Poland Jews "were not denied the right to live in Israel (never called the 'Zionist entity') … and "Yes, there were demands that Israel withdraw to the pre-1967 demarcation lines, but nobody anywhere chanted 'from the river to the sea.'"
