= Kfar Haim =

Moshav in central Israel

Kfar Haim: כפר חיים (Hebrew)
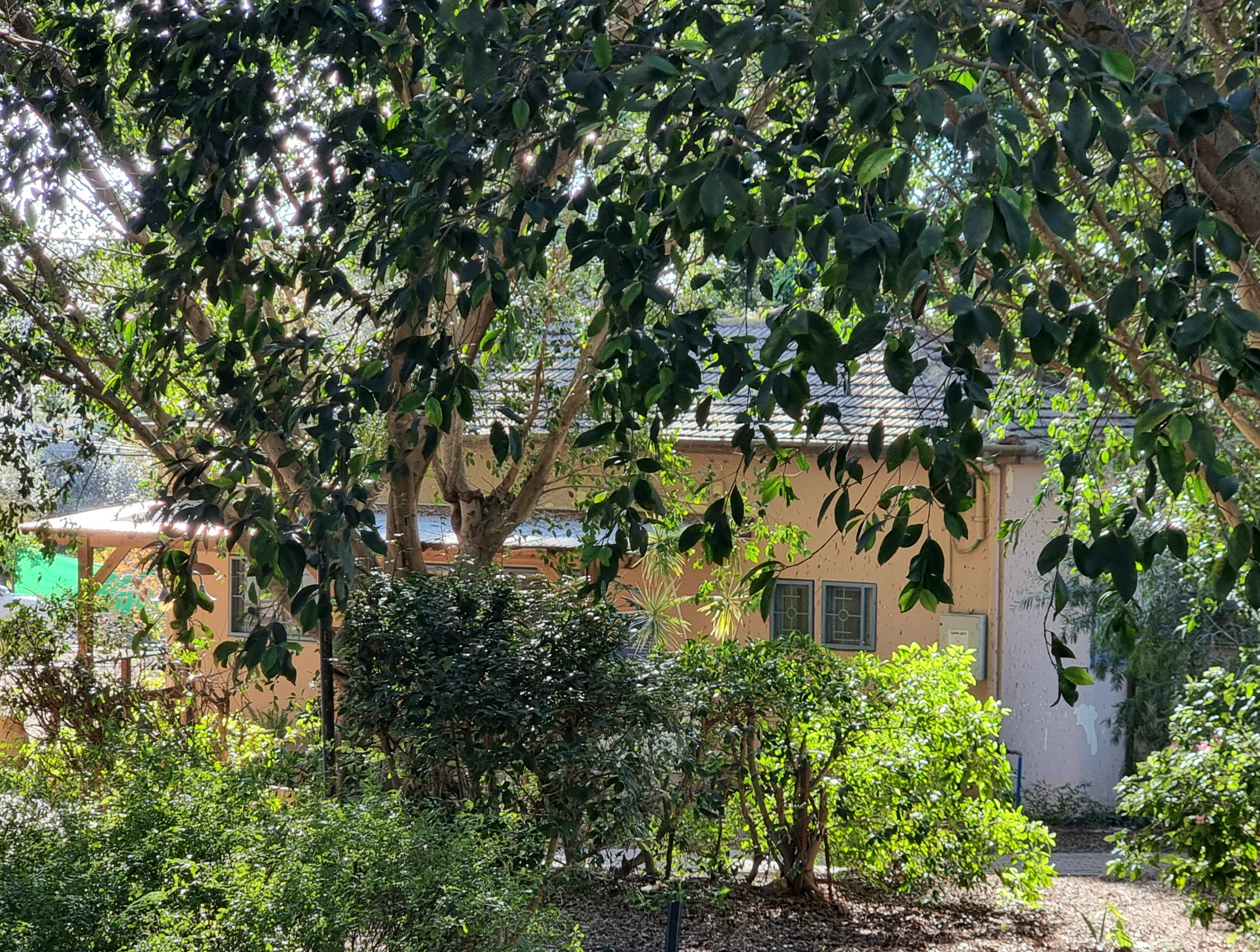

- Location within Central Israel Location within Israel
- Coordinates: 32°21′18″N 34°54′2″E
- Country: Israel
- District: Central
- Subdistrict: HaSharon
- Council: Hefer Valley
- Affiliation: Moshavim Movement
- Founded: 16 June 1933
- Founder: Polish and Russian immigrants
- Population (2024): 666

Kfar Haim (Hebrew: כפר חיים, lit. 'Haim Village') is a moshav in central Israel. Located in the coastal plain near Netanya, it falls under the jurisdiction of Hefer Valley Regional Council. In 2024 it had a population of 666.

== History ==
The moshav was founded on 16 June 1933 by Jewish immigrants from Poland and Russia, and was named after Haim Arlosoroff, who was assassinated on the day it was founded.

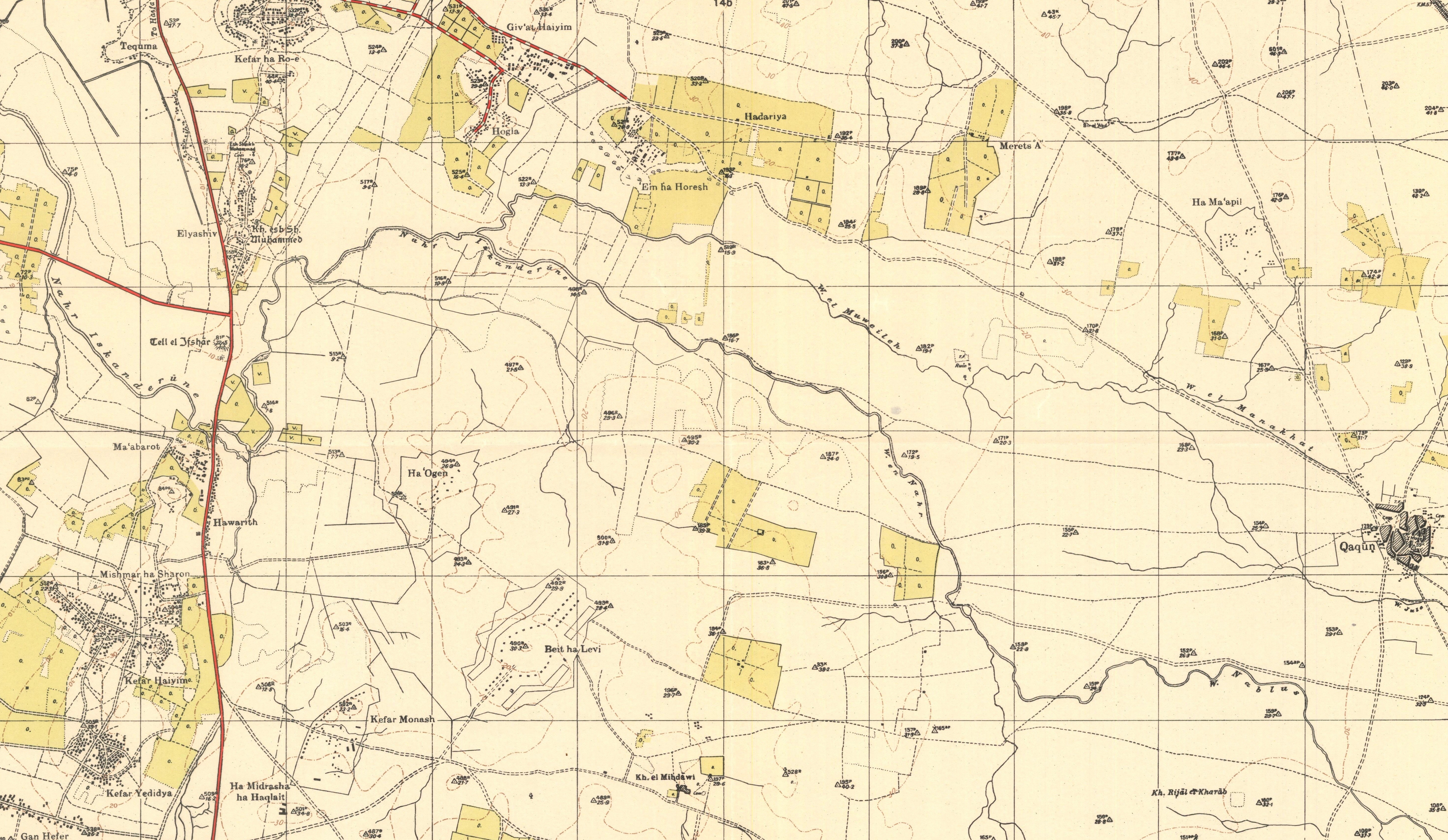
Kfar Haim (Kefar Haiyim) 1939 1:20,000

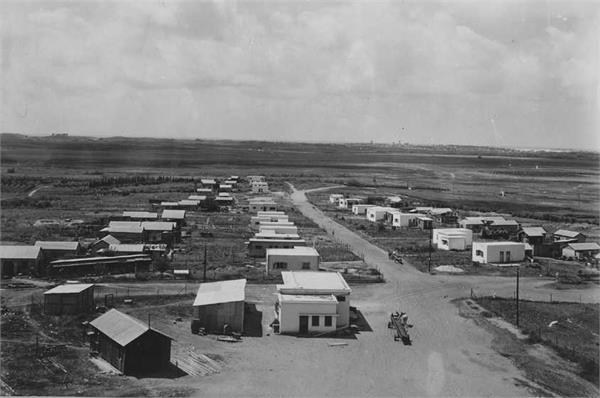
Kfar Haim 1940

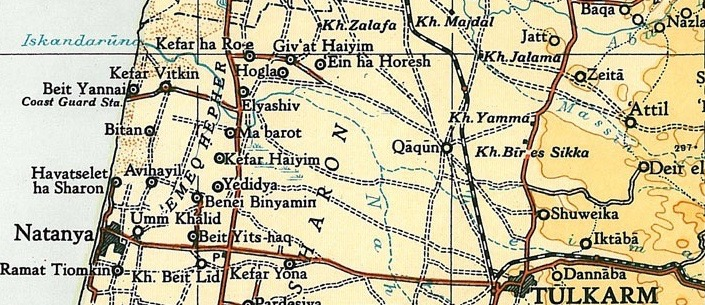
Kfar Haim (Kefar Haiyim) 1945 1:250,000

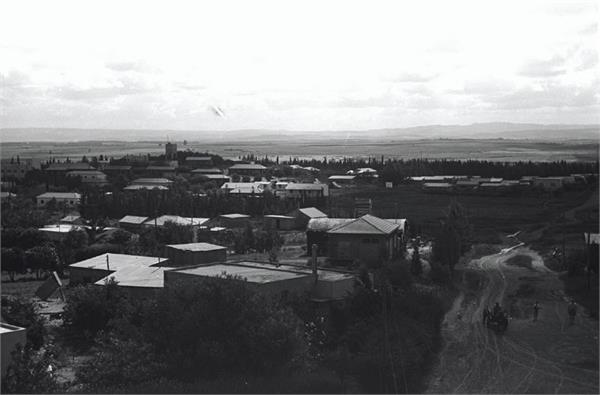
Kfar Haim 1947
