= Kibbutz (film) =

- Theatrical poster
- Directed by: Racheli Schwartz
- Produced by: Gal Schwartz
- Cinematography: Roni Katzanelson; Eyal Zehav
- Edited by: Yael Perlov
- Distributed by: Seventh Art
- Release date: 2005
- Running time: 54 minutes
- Country: Israel
- Language: Hebrew

Kibbutz (Hebrew: קיבוץ) is a 2005 Israeli documentary directed by Racheli Schwartz about Kibbutz Hulata, where she lived for 30 years.

The documentary follows various members, including Schwartz's own family, over the course of five years, tracing the stages of grieving and disillusionment that follow the kibbutz's economic collapse and disintegration as the community reduces its communal commitment to its members. Three older women from the founding generation become symbols of the kibbutz's lost ideals and abandoned history, as they die off, one by one.

The director, for whom the narrative is a very personal story, admits early on that “making the movie helped me to decide to stay.”

== Synopsis ==
Five years of documenting the director's kibbutz during a severe crisis that shook its foundations and drove people to extreme actions. The film tells the story of the downfall of a single kibbutz through the perspectives of several characters, including three close friends, founding members of the kibbutz, who, at the end of their lives, are forced to witness its collapse. They roam the kibbutz grounds on motorized carts, venturing out into the beautiful, steadfast nature.
