= Southern Command (Israel) =

Regional command of the Israel Defense Forces

- פיקוד דרום
- Padam logo, depicting a fox.
- Active: 1948–present
- Country: Israel
- Part of: Israel Defense Forces
- Garrison/HQ: Be’er Sheva
- Engagements: 1948 Palestine war; Suez Crisis; Six Day War; War of Attrition; Yom Kippur War; First Intifada; Second Intifada; Gaza War 2008-2009; 2014 Gaza War; 2021 Israel-Palestine crisis; Gaza war

Commanders
- Current commander: Aluf Yaniv Asor

Insignia
- Flag

The Southern Command (Hebrew: פיקוד דרום, romanized: Pikud Darom), often abbreviated to Padam (פד"מ), is a regional command of the Israel Defense Forces (IDF). It is responsible for the Negev, the Arava, and Eilat. It is currently headed by Yaniv Asor.

== History ==
For many years the Southern Command was tasked with defending the Negev and securing the border on the Sinai Peninsula from Egypt. The Southern Command led IDF troops in five wars against Egypt: the 1948 Arab–Israeli War, the Suez War, the Six-Day War, the War of Attrition, and the Yom Kippur War. This high operational activity and its demanding toll resulted in the Southern Command's Alufs (SCA) being replaced fairly rapidly.

The most famous leadership replacements took place in 1973, during the Yom Kippur War when Shmuel Gonen was suspended as the SCA due to repeated disputes with Ariel Sharon, who was the previous SCA. The government-appointed Haim Bar-Lev, who was the former Chief of the General Staff, as the new SCA in an emergency directive. After the Egypt–Israel peace treaty, the southern front remained quiet and most of the activity centred on guarding the borders from smugglers and fluid security over the Gaza Strip.

During the Second Intifada, the Command was placed in charge-of counter-terrorist efforts. The Gaza Strip, one of the most densely populated places in the world, was known as a stronghold for extremist groups such as Hamas and Islamic Jihad, who engaged in Palestinian political violence. The local production and proliferation of light anti-tank weapons by these groups, made travel by lightly armored vehicles dangerous.

From 2004, the fighting in Gaza became especially intensive, and on the IDF's part, included targeted killings, short armored expeditions, and efforts to locate and destroy the smuggling tunnels used by Palestinian militant groups to obtain weapons.

During 2005, the Southern Command was involved in the unilateral Gaza disengagement plan, initiated by Ariel Sharon (Prime Minister of Israel, 2001–2006), which mainly entailed the removals of all Israeli settlements from the Gaza Strip and back to the Israeli side of the Green Line. The Command re-situated itself north of the Gaza fence. The Philadelphi Route was given to Egypt, who did not prevent the movement of thousands of Palestinians between the Gaza Strip and the Sinai through the city of Rafah. As of 2006, the attempt to infiltrate Israel to perform suicide bombings and the launch of Qassam rockets, especially by Islamic Jihad and the Popular Resistance Committees, remains ongoing and is the central focus of the Southern Command.

On January 21, 2025, Finkelman submitted his resignation as commander of the Southern Command over the failures of October 7. He has stayed until a successor is named.

== Command organization ==
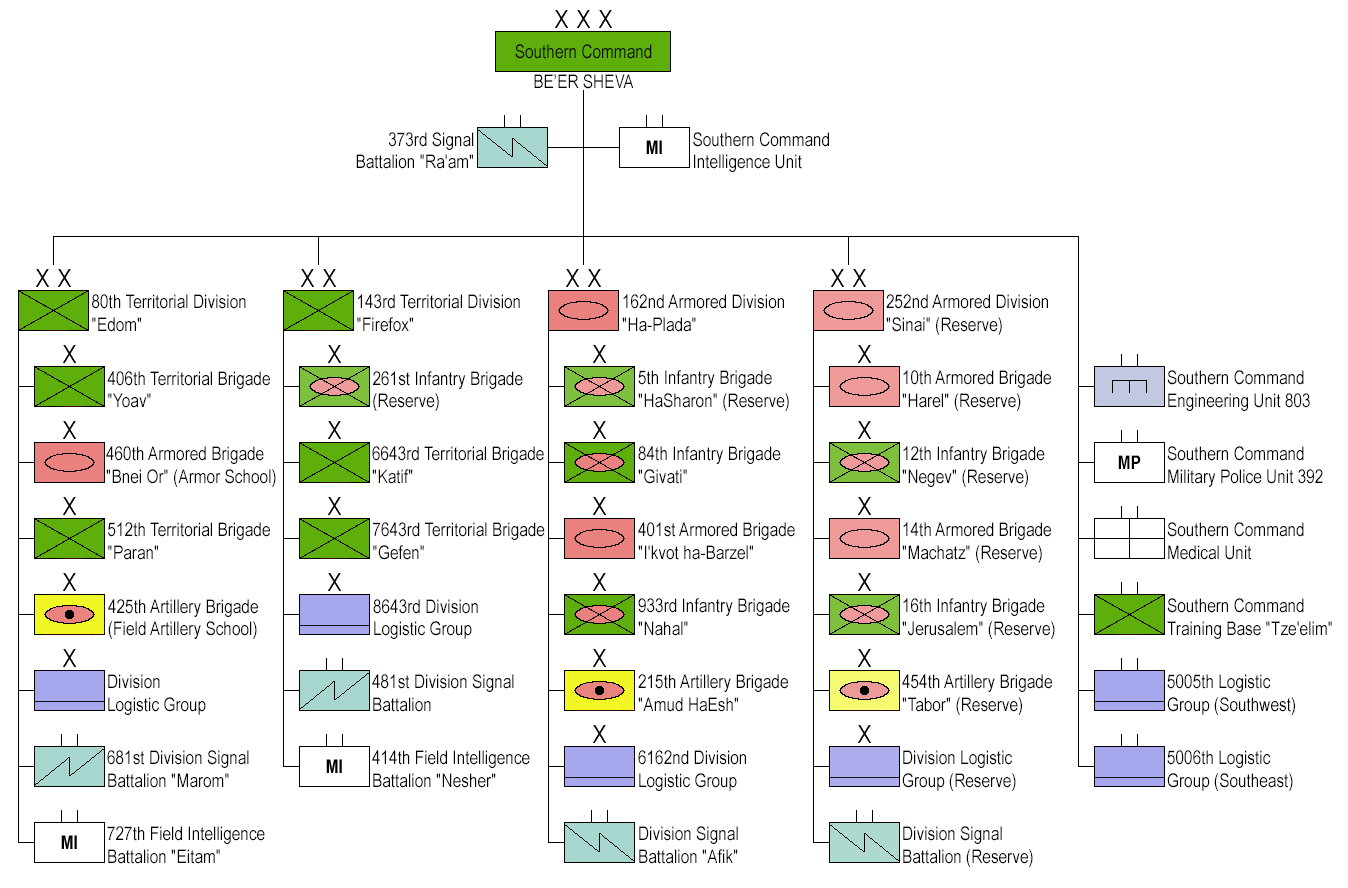
Southern Command organization as of November 2026

- Southern Command
  - 80th Territorial Division "Edom"
    - 189th Infantry Brigade "Negba" (Reserve)
    - 406th Territorial Brigade "Yoav"
    - 512th Territorial Brigade "Paran"
    - Division Logistic Group
  - 143rd Territorial Division "Firefox"
    - 6643rd Territorial Brigade "Katif" (Southern Gaza)
    - 7643rd Territorial Brigade "Gefen" (Northern Gaza)
    - 8643rd Division Logistic Group
  - 162nd Armored Division "Ha-Plada" ("Steel")
    - 5th Infantry Brigade "HaSharon" (Reserve)
    - 84th Infantry Brigade "Givati"
    - 401st Armored Brigade "I'kvot ha-Barzel" ("Iron Trails")
    - 933rd Infantry Brigade "Nahal"
    - 215th Artillery Brigade "Amud ha-Esh" ("Pillar of Fire")
    - 6162nd Division Logistic Group
  - 252nd Armored Division "Sinai"
    - 10th Armored Brigade "Harel" (Reserve)
    - 12th Infantry Brigade "Negev" (Reserve)
    - 14th Armored Brigade "Machatz" (Reserve)
    - 16th Infantry Brigade "Jerusalem" (Reserve)
    - 261st Infantry Brigade "Ramon" (Reserve)
    - 454th Artillery Brigade "Tabor" ("Fire Flame") (Reserve)
    - Division Logistic Group
  - Southern Command Intelligence Unit
  - Southern Command Training Base "Tze'elim"
  - Southern Command Medical Unit
  - 373rd Signal Battalion "Ra'am"
  - 392nd Military Police Unit
  - 653rd Maintenance Battalion "HaNegev"
  - 674th Maintenance Battalion "HaArava"
  - 803rd Combat Engineering Equipment Unit
    - 8163rd Combat Engineering Equipment Battalion (Reserve)
  - 5005th Logistic Group (Southwest)
  - 5006th Logistic Group (Southeast)

== Commanders ==
Name	Dates	Image	Notes	Ref
Yigal Allon	1948–1949			
Yitzhak Rabin	1949		Acting commander	
Moshe Dayan	October 1949 – October 1951			
Moshe Tzadok	October 1951 – January 1954			
Yaakov Peri	1954		Acting commander	
Zvi Gilat	1955			
Meir Amit	November 1955 – August 1956			
Asaf Simhoni	August–November 1956		Acting commander in Operation Kadesh	
Haim Laskov	November 1956 – January 1958			
Chaim Herzog	January–July 1958			
Avraham Yoffe	July 1958 – May 1962			
Zvi Zamir	May 1962 – December 1965			
Yeshayahu Gavish	December 1965 – December 1969			
Ariel Sharon	December 1969 – July 1973			
Shmuel Gonen	July–November 1973			
Haim Bar-Lev	October 1973		As former Chief of Staff, assumed command during the Yom Kippur War	
Israel Tal	November 1973 – January 1974			
Avraham Adan	January–July 1974			
Yekutiel Adam	July 1974 – March 1976			
Herzl Shafir	March 1976 – February 1978			
Dan Shomron	February 1978 – January 1982			
Chaim Erez	January 1982 – October 1983			
Moshe Bar-Kochva	October 1983 – February 1986			
Uri Sagi	February–August 1986			
Yitzhak Mordechai	August 1986 – 1989			
Matan Vilnai	1989 – November 1994			
Shaul Mofaz	November 1994 – 1996			
Shlomo Yanai	1996 – September 1997			
Yom-Tov Samia	September 1997 – 2000			
Doron Almog	2000 – July 2003			
Dan Harel	July 2003 – October 2005			
Yoav Gallant	October 2005 – October 2010			
Tal Russo	October 2010 – April 2013			
Sami Turgeman	April 2013 – October 2015			
Eyal Zamir	14 October 2015 – 6 June 2018			
Herzi Halevi	6 June 2018 – 21 March 2021			
Eliezer Toledano	21 March 2021 – 9 July 2023			
Yaron Finkelman	9 July 2023 – 12 March 2025			
Yaniv Asor	12 March 2025 –			

== See also ==
- Israel Defense Forces
- IDF Code of Ethics
- Negev
- Negev Brigade
