= Operations Directorate =

Israeli military unit

- אגף המבצעים
- Active: 1999–present
- Country: Israel
- Allegiance: Israel Defense Forces

Commanders
- Current commander: Aluf Oded Basyuk

Insignia
- Flag

The Operations Directorate (Hebrew: אגף המבצעים, Agaf HaMivtza'im, abbreviated as (Hebrew: אג"ם Agam) is the operations branch in the General Staff of the Israel Defense Forces. It was established in 1999, alongside the regional commands, the air force and navy. Since June 2021, it is headed by Aluf Oded Basyuk.

== History ==
In 2022, the Operations Directorate established the Personal Security Branch within the Security Division to safeguard IDF soldiers and officers from international threats. The branch was established in the aftermath of an active duty soldier flying to visit family in Uzbekistan, whose plane landed in Iran, with whom Israel does not have diplomatic relations, as a result of a medical emergency.

== Tasks ==
The directorate has the following responsibilities:

- Preparing the IDF for war, emergencies, and day-to-day security
- Deriving an operational strategy from the national security agenda and military doctrine
- Coordinating the IDF's work with the other security forces, and drafting IDF recommendations for the political echelon
- Instructing the regional command, air force, navy, GOC Army Headquarters and other directorates, with respect to the exercise of force and its coordination

== Units ==
- Operations Division
- Instruction, Doctrine and Evaluation Division
- IDF Spokesperson
- Special Means Division
- Department for Campaign Design
- Centre for Consciousness Operations
- Inspection and Supervision Department
- General Staff Security Department
- Personal Security Branch

== Commanders ==
The list includes those who served as heads of operations prior to when it was spun off from the IDF's General Staff. The list also includes pre-IDF Haganah commander Yigael Yadin who also served in that capacity during the 1948 Arab–Israeli War. Dan Halutz, who original served as the Aide to Chief of the Operations Branch, was appointed to the head of the Operations Directorate soon after its establishment.

Name	Term start	Term end	Notes
Yigael Yadin	November 16, 1947	November 9, 1949	
Mordechai Maklef	November 14, 1949	December 7, 1952	
Moshe Dayan	December 17, 1952	December 6, 1953	
Yosef Avidar	December 22, 1953	February 15, 1955	
Meir Amit	February 23, 1955	May 28, 1955	Later Director of Mossad
Haim Laskov	August 28, 1955	July 24, 1956	
Meir Amit	October 5, 1956	January 26, 1958	
Tzvi Tzur	1958		
Meir Zorea	September 10, 1958	April 28, 1959	
Yitzhak Rabin	April 28, 1959	January 23, 1961	5th Prime Minister
Yitzhak Rabin	January 23, 1961	December 30, 1963	
Haim Bar-Lev	January 1, 1964	April 27, 1966	
Ezer Weizman	April 27, 1966	December 14, 1969	Later President of Israel
David Elazar	December 23, 1969	January 1, 1972	
Israel Tal	January 1, 1972	June 28, 1973	
Rehavam Ze'evi	November 2, 1973	January 16, 1974	
Yitzhak Hofi	January 16, 1974	April 16, 1974	Later Director of Mossad
Herzl Shafir	April 16, 1974	March 1, 1976	Later Commissioner of Police
Yekutiel Adam	March 2, 1976	August 25, 1977	
Rafael Eitan	August 25, 1977	April 7, 1978	
Yekutiel Adam	1978	January 1982	
Moshe Levi	January 1982	1983	
David Ivry	1983	1985	
Dan Shomron	January 17, 1985	October 1, 1986	
Amir Drori	October 1, 1986	April 6, 1987	
Ehud Barak	May 7, 1987	March 13, 1991	10th Prime Minister
Amnon Lipkin-Shahak	March 13, 1991	November 29, 1994	
Matan Vilnai	November 29, 1994	September 15, 1997	
Shaul Mofaz	September 15, 1997	June 11, 1998	
Uzi Dayan	June 11, 1998	June 27, 1999	
Dan Halutz	June 27, 1999	September 15, 2000	
Giora Eiland	September 15, 2000	January 25, 2001	
Dan Harel	January 26, 2001	2003	
Israel Ziv	2003	2005	
Gadi Eizenkot	June 2005	October 12, 2006	
Tal Russo	October 12, 2006	October 4, 2010	
Yaakov Ayash	October 4, 2010	September 6, 2012	
Yoav Har-Even	September 6, 2012	May 26, 2015	
Nitzan Alon	May 26, 2015		

=== Assistant Head of the Operations Branch ===
The list is of those who served as Assistant Head of the Operations Branch prior to establishment of the Operations Directorate in 1999.

Name	Term	Notes
Tzvi Tzur	1950–1951	
Haim Ben-David	1951–1953	
Ilan Meyer	1953–1954	
Asaf Simhoni	1954–1956	
Meir Zorea	1956	
Uzi Narkiss	1956–1957	During Sinai War
Ariel Amiad	1957–1958	
Shalom Iron	1958–1960	
Israel Tal	1961	
Oded Masar	July to December 1961	
Yeshayahu Gavish	1961–1962	
Elad Peled	1962–1963	
Gideon Elrom	1963–1964	
Rehavam Ze'evi	1964–1968	During Six-Day War
Yitzhak Hofi	1968–1969	
Herzl Shafir	1969–1971	
Yona Efrat	1971–1973	
Arie Levy	1973–1974	During Yom Kippur War
Mordechai Tzipori	1974–1976	
Avigdor Ben-Gal	1976	
Natan Sharoni	1976–1978	
Eitan Barak	1978–1980	
Uri Simchoni	1980–1981	
Giora Ram-Forman	1981–1983	During the First Lebanon War
Uri Sagi	1983–1986	
Amram Mitzna	1986–1987	
Giora Romm	1987–1989	
Zeev Livne	1989–1992	
Nehemiah Tamari	1992–1993	
Meir Dagan	1993–1995	
Eitan Ben Eliyahu	1995–1996	
Gabi Ashkenazi	1996–1998	
Dan Halutz	1998–1999	Post terminated; Halutz became head of the Operations Directorate

== See also ==
- General staff
- Staff (military)
