= Amir Baram =

Israeli general

- אמיר ברעם
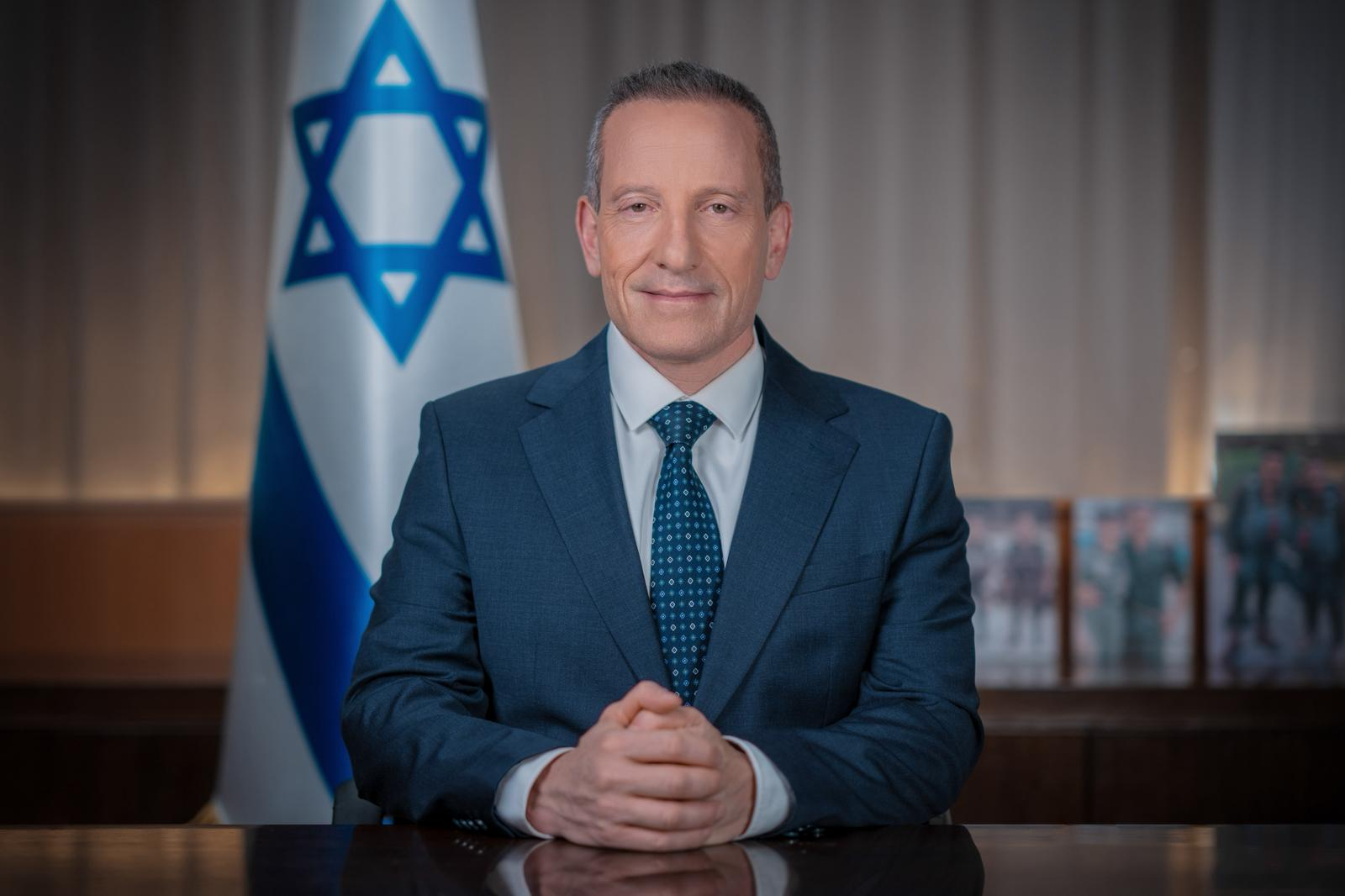
- Amir Baram as Director-General of the Israeli Ministry of Defense, 2025
- Born: 22 July 1969 (age 57); Beersheba, Israel
- Military career
- Allegiance: Israel
- Branch: Israel Defense Forces
- Service years: 1988–2025
- Rank: Aluf (Major General)
- Commands: 890 "Efe" (Echis) paratroop battalion; Unit 212 - Maglan, Reserve Paratroopers Brigade; 35th Paratroopers Brigade; 98th Paratroopers Division; 91st Division; IDF Military Colleges; Northern Command
- Conflicts: South Lebanon conflict (1985–2000); First Intifada; Second Intifada; 2006 Lebanon War; Operation Cast Lead; Operation Pillar of Defense; Operation Protective Edge

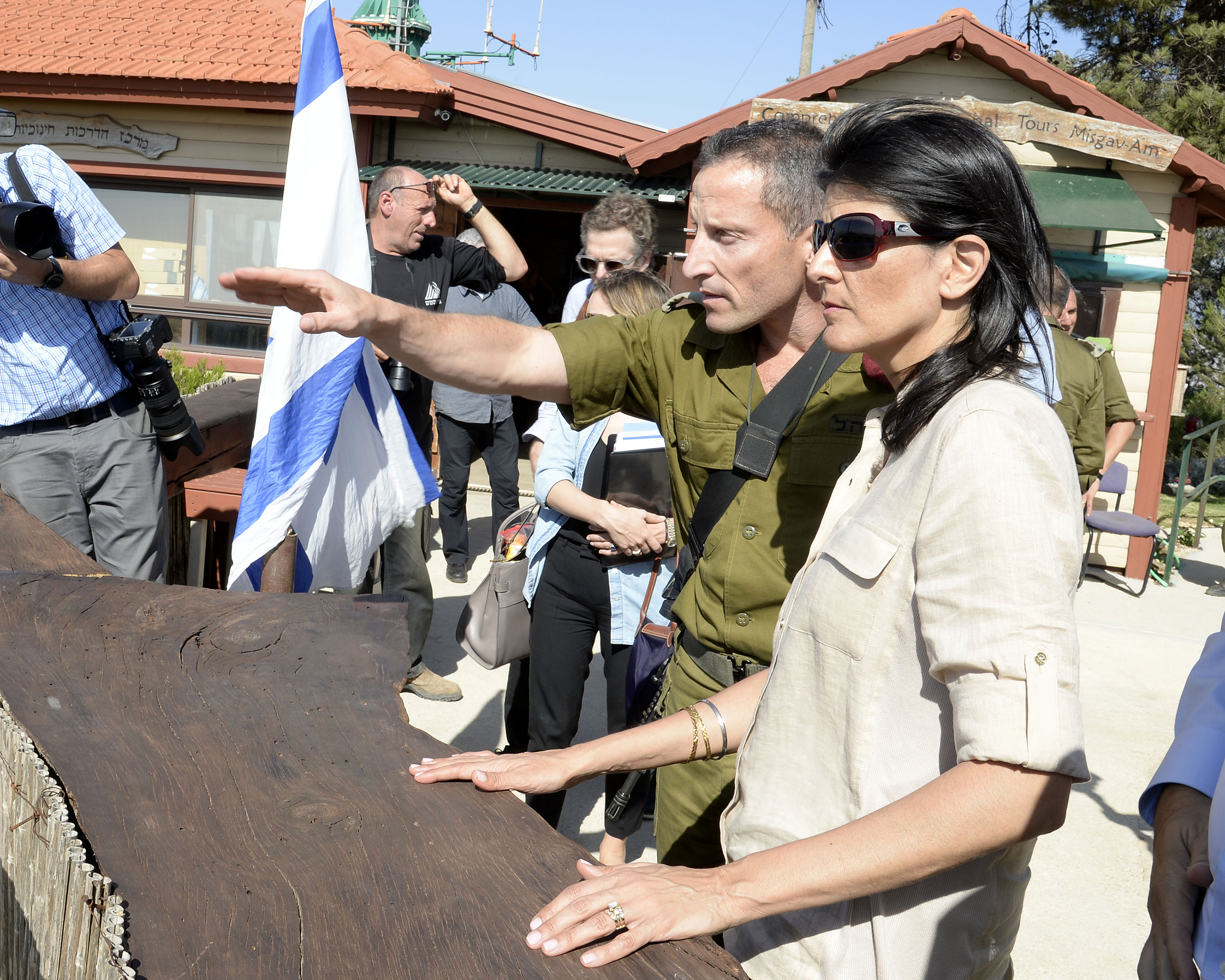
United States Ambassador to the UN, Nikki Haley, and Amir Baram on the northern border, June 2017

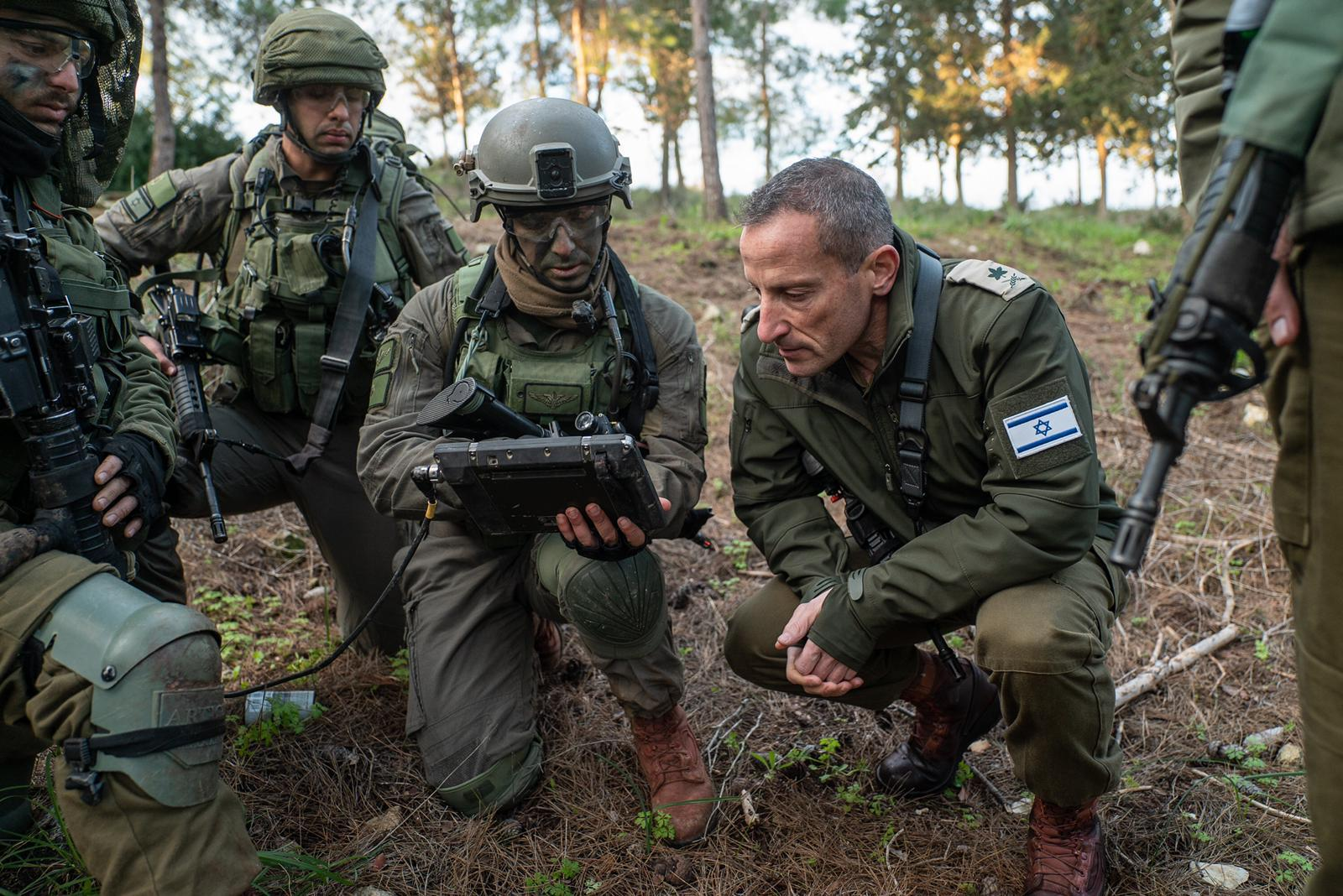
Baram as commander of the Northern Command, during a proficiency test for the command's combat units, 2020

Amir Baram (Hebrew: אמיר ברעם; born 22 July 1969) is an Israel Defense Forces major general (Aluf) who currently serves as the Director-General of the Israeli Ministry of Defense. He previously served as the Deputy Chief of General Staff, commander of the Northern Command, commander of the IDF Military Colleges, commander of the 91st Division, commander of 98th Paratroopers Division and commander of the Paratroopers Brigade.

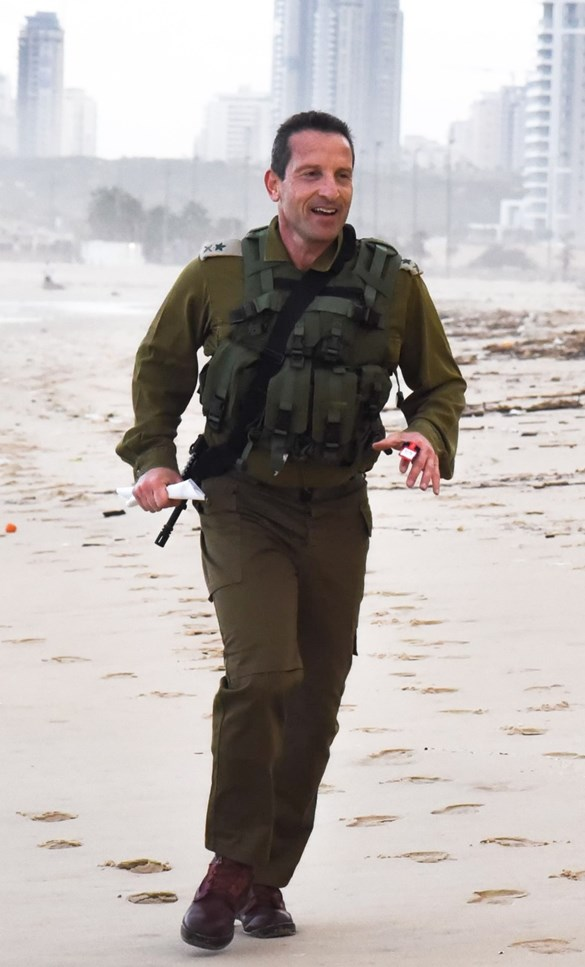
Baram as commander of the Command and Staff College and the Northern Corps, conducting a combat fitness test with the staff and cadets at the military colleges, 17 December 2018

== Early life ==
Baram, the son of Yitzhak Baram, was born in Beersheba and lived until around age 6 in Safed, and later in Ra'anana. He studied at the Reali School in Haifa and was a cadet at the military boarding school, graduating with distinction from Class 34.

== Biography ==
He enlisted in the IDF in November 1988, volunteering for the Paratroopers Brigade and was assigned to the Paratrooper Reconnaissance Unit. He completed the training as a combat soldier, followed by the Infantry Commanders Course and Infantry Officers Course, graduating as an outstanding cadet. He was appointed as a team leader in the Paratrooper Reconnaissance Unit and later served as deputy company commander. In 1992, he became a company commander in the 890th Battalion. Later, he commanded the Paratrooper Reconnaissance Unit from 1994 to 1996, leading operations including Operation Pink Panther, in which four Hezbollah militants were killed in Lebanon. He subsequently served as a company commander at Officer Training School (Bahad 1). After his term, he pursued studies at the Interdisciplinary Center Herzliya. In February 1999, he interrupted his studies to replace the commander of the Paratrooper Reconnaissance Unit, Eitan Belhassan, who was killed in action in Southern Lebanon. He rehabilitated the unit and led it to numerous operational achievements before the withdrawal from Lebanon in May 2000. After the withdrawal, he resumed his studies at the Interdisciplinary Center Herzliya, earning a law degree with honors. He later attended the National Defense College.

In 2002, he was promoted to the rank of Lieutenant Colonel and appointed commander of the 890th Battalion, serving until 2003. During his tenure, he led the battalion in fighting against Palestinian terror organizations in Bethlehem before Operation Defensive Shield, and in the Battle of Nablus during the operation. The battalion was later deployed in intense operational activities in Tulkarm. The battalion gained media exposure following an event where soldiers appeared as needy, prompting Baram to clarify in an interview that the paratrooper battalion did not require charity. Another event that drew attention was his adoption of a battalion motto inspired by the U.S. Marines' counterterrorism doctrine: "Patience, perseverance, and sometimes a bullet between the eyes" Following a complaint from a reserve soldier to MK Yossi Sarid, Sarid raised the issue with then-Chief of Staff Moshe Ya'alon, a former commander of the battalion, who ordered the motto's removal. The motto was replaced with one coined by Ariel Sharon as battalion commander: "No Return Until the Mission Is Completed." In Tulkarm, he improved ambush tactics in urban combat, leading to operational successes (operations "Stimulus-Response"). In May 2004, he was appointed commander of Maglan Unit, serving until June 2006. During his tenure, the unit conducted operations mainly in the West Bank and Gaza, but also participated in operations against Hezbollah on the Lebanese border.

=== Commander of the Shomron Brigade ===
On 17 August 2006, he was promoted to Colonel and appointed commander of the Shomron Brigade. During his tenure, he led extensive counterterrorism operations and thwarted attacks, while easing measures for the civilian population. Among his brigade's achievements was the elimination of Fadi Al-Latif Kapisha, the leader of the Tanzim military wing in Nablus, killed by soldiers of the Haruv Battalion. He published an internal book in the IDF, "Fortress City", documenting methods of combat in dense and underground urban areas. He completed his term as brigade commander in 2008.

He then went on to study at the Royal College of Defence Studies (RCDS) in London and simultaneously earned a master's degree in International Relations with honors from King's College London. Upon returning, he was appointed in January 2010 as commander of the 162nd Division, serving until March 2011. On 14 April 2011, he was appointed commander of the Paratroopers Brigade. During his command, he reinstated full brigade parachute training, and in January 2012, he led the brigade in its first full brigade parachute exercise in fifteen years. He completed his role on 16 May 2013.

=== 2013–2019 ===
On October 10, 2013, he was promoted to Brigadier General and appointed commander of the Fire Formation, serving until July 2, 2015. On August 2, 2015, he was appointed commander of the Galilee Division, serving until July 18, 2017. During his command, Samir Kuntar was eliminated, and Hezbollah responded with a roadside bomb on Mount Dov, an incident in which there were no casualties. On 7 December 2017, he was promoted to Major General and appointed commander of the Northern Corps, and on 3 January 2018, he simultaneously assumed the position of commander of the IDF Command and Staff College. He held the position at the military colleges until March 11, 2019, and his role as commander of the Northern Corps until 26 September 2019.

=== Commander of the Northern Command ===
On April 3, 2019, he was appointed commander of the Northern Command. During his tenure, he initiated a standard assessment test, which was completed by all regular and reserve brigades designated to participate in combat in the north. Under his command, the Northern Command led numerous covert operations in southern Syria as part of the campaign between wars (CBW), including airstrikes, ground raids, and targeted killings. These actions prevented Iran's efforts to establish a front against Israel in the Syrian Golan Heights, similar to the one established in Lebanon. In September 2019, he led the command's forces during a day of battle with Hezbollah, in which Hezbollah militants fired anti-tank missiles at IDF posts and an IDF ambulance near the border. In July 2020, he led the command's forces during another day of battle with Hezbollah, during which a Hezbollah cell attempted to infiltrate Mount Dov, was detected, and fled. In August 2020, after Hezbollah snipers fired at an IDF force moving along the fence near Manara, he led a limited operation that targeted several Hezbollah positions near the border. He held this position until 11 September 2022. On 31 October 2022, he was appointed Deputy Chief of Staff.

=== Swords of Iron war ===
During Swords of Iron war, Baram assumed a senior role in IDF international arms and munition procurement efforts and participated in a battle in the al-Tuffah neighborhood in Gaza alongside soldiers. During early January 2025, a correspondent by Baram was published which indicated a letter he wrote to IDF chief of staff asking for early resignation by February 2025, due to reductions in the war efforts intensity, feeling unused.

== Director-General of the Ministry of Defense ==
On 24 March 2025, he took office as Director-General of the Ministry of Defense. In his inaugural speech, he presented the ministry's goals under his leadership, including the formulation of a ministry strategy to ensure the defense system's ability to defeat any threat "from knife to nuclear", (Note: Hebrew: "מסכין עד גרעין") including unexpected threats. Baram emphasized the need to address conflicts in force building, encourage learning and reorganization, and prioritize "value accelerators" such as technology, human resources, new combat capabilities and defense industry industrialization, as well as strengthening the State's foreign relations.

=== Operations Rising Lion and Gideon's Chariots ===
During Operation Rising Lion, Baram led the Ministry of Defense's activities in preparation and execution, and in coordination with the United States, which participated in operation of Israel's multi-layered defense system. The ministry absorbed air and sea shipments of combat means and ammunition, and signed agreements to strengthen force building, including accelerating the production of Arrow interceptors at Israel Aerospace Industries.

Baram led the formulation of the agreement with the Ministry of Finance for an additional budget of 42 billion NIS for the defense system for the years 2025–2026, due to Rising Lion and Gideon's Chariots. The Israeli defense and finance ministries announced this significant budget increase to cover the ongoing military operations and security challenges.

In a situation assessment conducted with the CEOs of defense industries on the 3rd day of Operation Rising Lion (June 15), Baram said, in view of the IDF's achievements: "The ability to reach Tehran, senior regime officials and nuclear and ballistic missile facilities, with such precision and simultaneously, as well as to defend against large barrages of ballistic missiles, would not have been possible without breakthrough Israeli technology, developed over years in the defense industries and DDR&D (Hebrew: מפא"ת). Alongside the achievements, we must address the accelerated learning competition, look towards the future, strengthen the Israeli industrial base, enable greater production rates and accelerate the development of the next generations of combat systems, both offensive and defensive – only thus will we enable relative and qualitative advantage in future systems as well."

== Personal life and education ==
Baram resides in Bnei Dror, is married to Galit, and is the father of three children. He is a graduate of the IDF Command and Staff College and the Royal College of Defence Studies. He holds a bachelor's degree in Law from Reichman University, and a master's degree in International Relations from King's College London.

== Awards and decorations ==
Baram was awarded three campaign ribbons for his service during three conflicts.

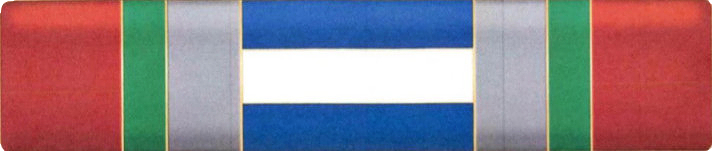

Second Lebanon War	South Lebanon Security Zone	Operation Protective Edge
