= Bahad 1 =

IDF officers' school

- Logo of Bahad 1
- Type: Military academy
- Established: 1968
- Commander: Colonel Eliav Elbaz
- Location: Southern district, Israel
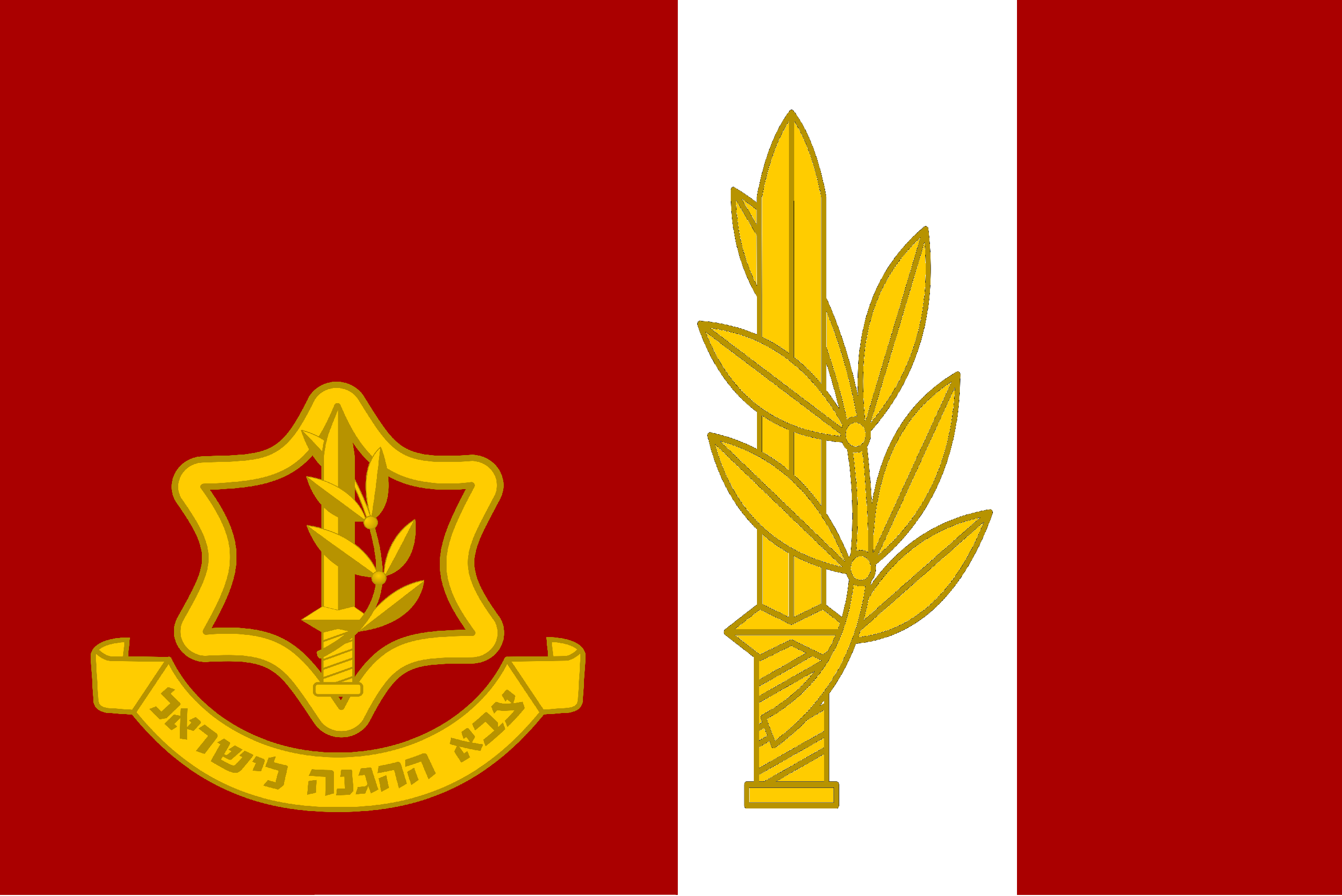

The IDF Officers' School, commonly known as Bahad 1, is the initial officer training academy of the Israeli Ground Forces. It is located in Negev Desert, near the town of Mitzpe Ramon in Southern district, Israel.

The mission of Bahad 1 is to serve as a training base for basic training of officer cadets of IDF, in maneuvering formation, combat formation, administrative support formation, and as a training base for the training of infantry platoon commanders. The commander of the officers' school is Colonel Eliav Elbaz from July 2024.

== History ==
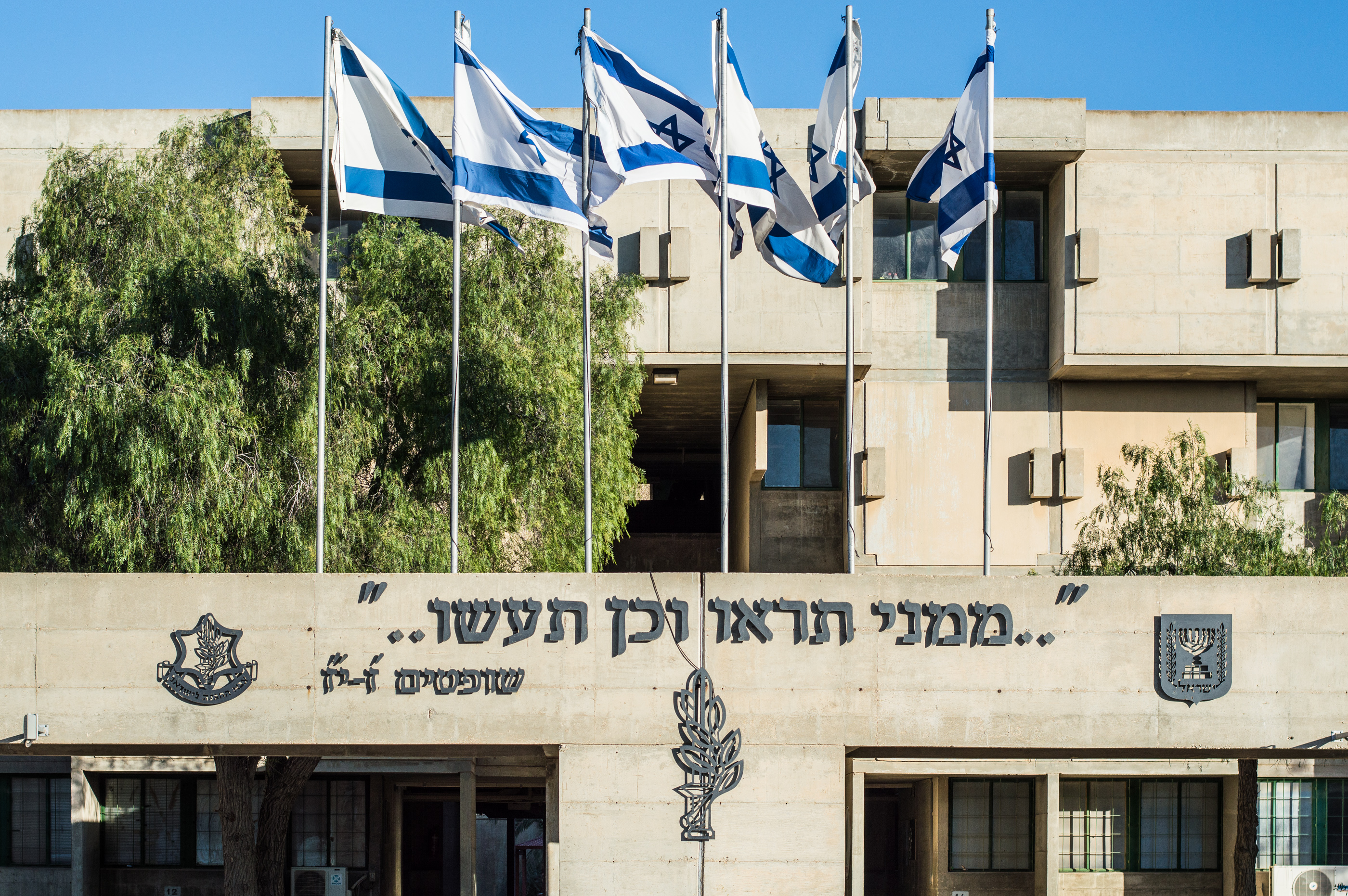
Entrance of Bahad 1 Officers' School

The Haganah's Department Commanders' courses were held since 1921 in various locations throughout the country. The first course was held at Kibbutz Kfar Giladi, and from 1937 onwards they were mostly held at the Jo'ara base.

Following the establishment of IDF in May 1948, the Officers' School moved to Camp 80 in Pardes Hanna, then to Camp Sirkin in Petah Tikva in August 1955. Finally it moved to its designated location in Southern district of the country, in May 1968. It was designed by architect Zvi Hecker.

Until the year 2000, training of women officers was separate from that of the men, at a different base. Beginning that year, the courses were combined and now men and women officers are trained together at Bahad 1.

== Organization ==
- IDF Officers' School (Bahad 1)
  - "Dekel" Battalion (Lahav — Ground Forces Officers' Course)
  - "Hadas" Battalion (Lahav — Ground Forces Officers' Course)
  - "Rimon" Battalion (Lahav — Ground Forces Officers' Course)
  - "Dolev" Battalion (Lahav — Ground Forces Reserve Officers' Course)
  - "Harov" Battalion (Ma'oz — Battalion and Brigade Staff Officers' Course)
  - "Brosh" Battalion (Nachshon — Combat Support Staff Officers' Course)
  - "Erez" Battalion (Nachshon — Combat Support Staff Officers' Course)
  - "Alon" Battalion (Specialists — Academic Reserve Officers' Course)
  - "Gefén" Battalion (Infantry and Special Forces Officers' Specialization Course)

== International course ==
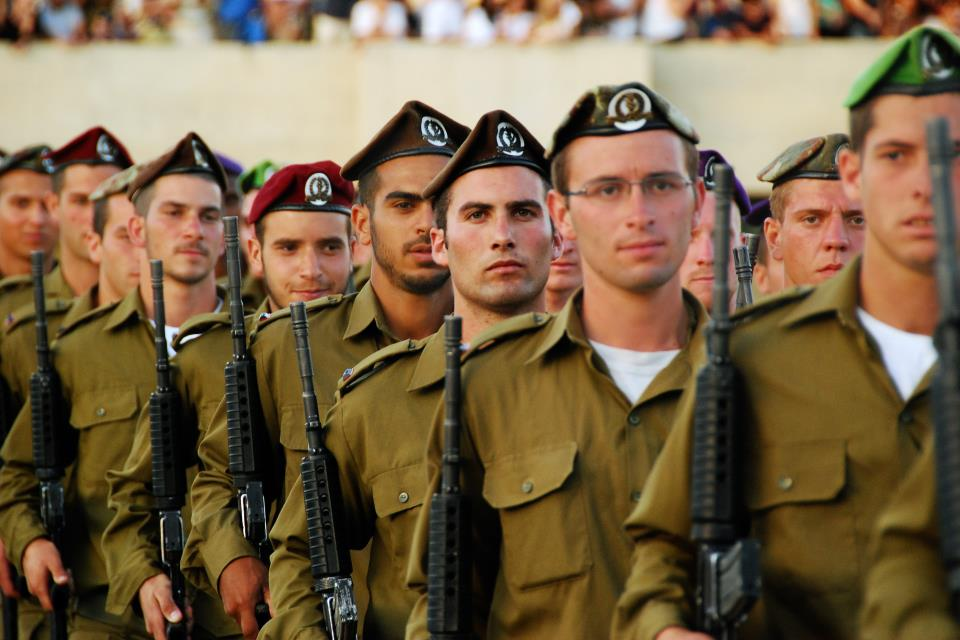
Israeli Ground Forces officers' course graduation ceremony

Starting in August 2015, every few months, an international officer course has been held at the academy. As part of this course, officers from combat units from foreign armies come to the academy to learn about IDF's methods of operation and the Israeli-Arab conflict. The foreign officers accompany the Lahav cadets in their training (with an emphasis on travel and navigation), participate in the multi-service training of combat complements, learn about the Home front command and the Israeli home front in the conflict, have a day of tours at the town of Sderot. So far, 27 officers from the armies of the United States, Canada, Chile, Brazil, the Netherlands, Germany, Italy, Greece, Czech Republic and South Korea have participated in the international course.

== Criticism ==
In the 2000s, criticism of the IDF officer training process increased, especially after the command failure in the Second Lebanon War and the conclusions of the Winograd Commission.

The main criticism is that the IDF does not provide its officers with sufficient professional training and education they need to fulfill their duties. The training is brief and not in-depth. The military education system in most Western armies is made up of several tiers. The first of which usually lasts three or four years, as is the practice at the United States Military Academy (West Point) of US Army, the Royal Military Academy Sandhurst of British Army, and the Saint-Cyr Military Academy of French Army. When senior IDF officers arrive at Inter-Services Command and Staff College, they actually acquire knowledge that they were supposed to have learned at the officer school.

== Notable alumni ==
- Lt. Gen. Aviv Kohavi, 22nd Chief of the General Staff of the Israel Defense Forces

== See also ==
- Bahad
- IDF Military Colleges
- Israeli Naval Academy
- Israeli Air Force Flight Academy
