= Nimrod Aloni =

Israeli general

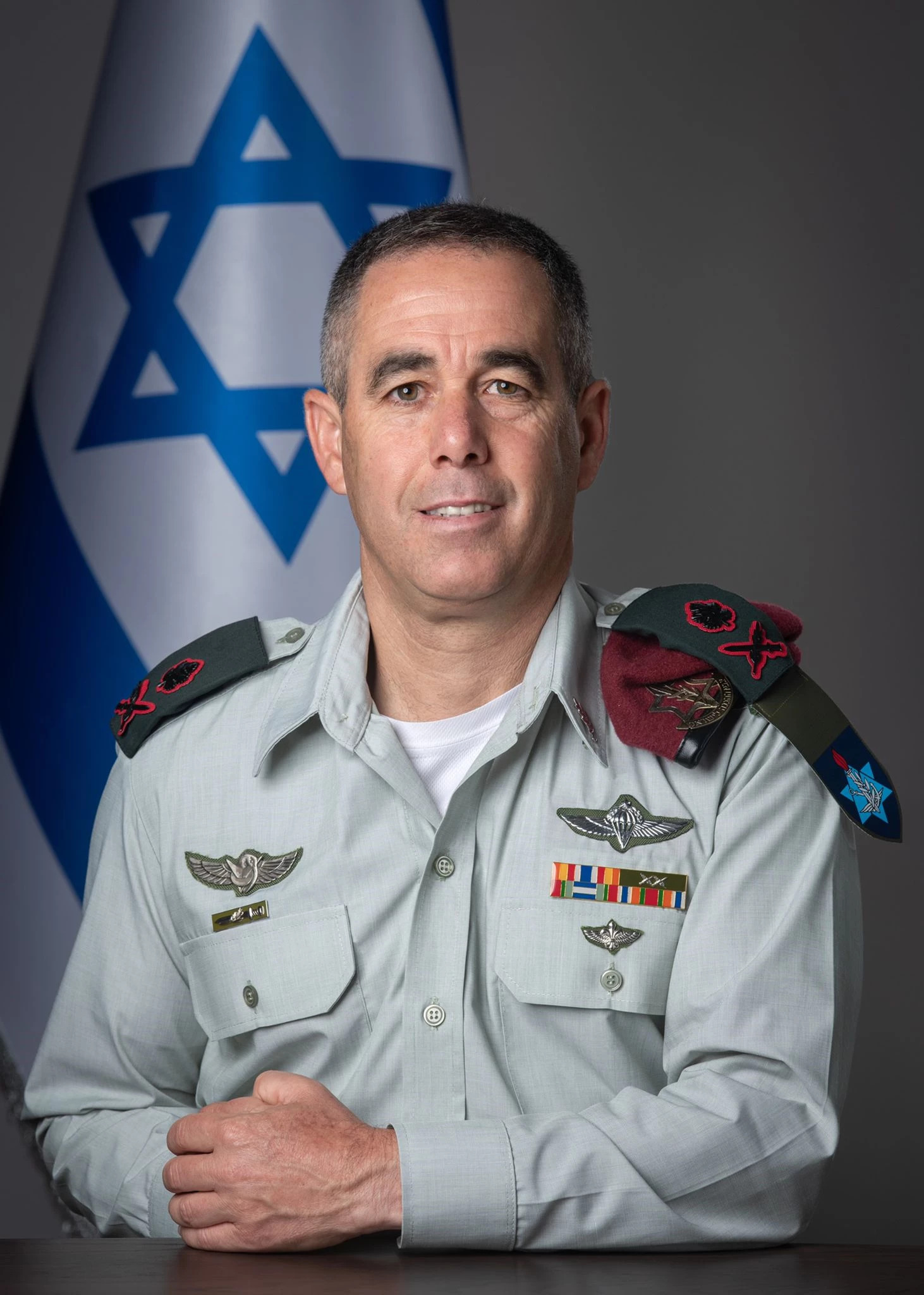
- Native name: נמרוד אלוני
- Born: 12 July 1973 (age 52) Jerusalem, Israel
- Allegiance: Israel
- Branch: Israel Defense Forces
- Rank: Major General
- Commands: Depth Corps; 143rd 'Gaza' Division

Nimrod Aloni (Hebrew: נמרוד אלוני; born 12 July 1973) is a major-general in the Israeli Defence Force.

He has held a number of important posts in the IDF, including commander of the Depth Corps, commander of the 143rd 'Gaza' Division, and led operations in the Ramallah area.

== Biography ==
Aloni was born in the Ein Karem village on the outskirts of Jerusalem. In November 1991, he enlisted in the IDF, volunteering for the 35th Paratroopers Brigade where he was appointed as a commander after completing an infantry commander course. He continued in various commander positions until June 2002 when he was promoted to Major General of the Central Command.

In 2012, at the end of his term as the commander of the Samaria Regional Brigade, he took responsibility for the failures that led to the deaths of 5 members of the Fogel family during an attack on their Itamar home in March 2011.

In 2017 he was appointed the Depth Corps chief of staff, and in July 2019, he was appointed commander of the 143rd 'Gaza' Division. On 16 July 2023 an exchange ceremony was held in which Aloni assumed the office of commander of the Depth Corps, replacing outgoing Major General Itai Veruv.

In 2023, on the day of the October 7 attacks, Hamas falsely proclaimed to have captured Aloni as a prisoner. An IDF spokesperson denied the claims, and the claim was proven false with an IDF video on 8 October showing Aloni speaking with other Israeli military officials.
