= Doron Rubin =

Israeli general (1944–2018)

- דורון רובין
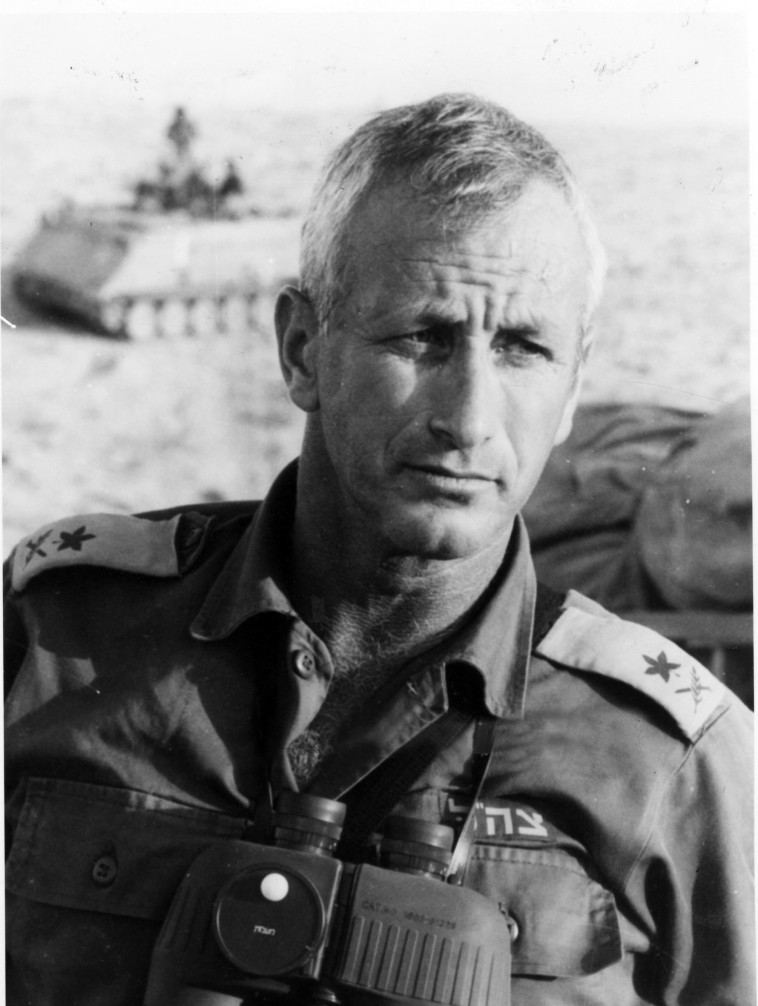
- Born: 1944; Bustan HaGalil
- Died: 20 January 2018 (aged 73–74)
- Military career
- Allegiance: Israel Defense Forces
- Service years: 1963–1991
- Rank: Aluf
- Unit: Paratroopers Brigade
- Commands: 202 paratroop battalion, reserve paratrooper brigade, the IDF's Officer Candidate School (Bahad 1), the 35th Paratroopers Brigade, 500th Brigade, 162nd Division, Instruction and Doctrine Directorate, the headquarters for special operations
- Conflicts: Six-Day War; War of Attrition; Yom Kippur War; Operation Litani; 1982 Lebanon War; South Lebanon conflict First Intifada

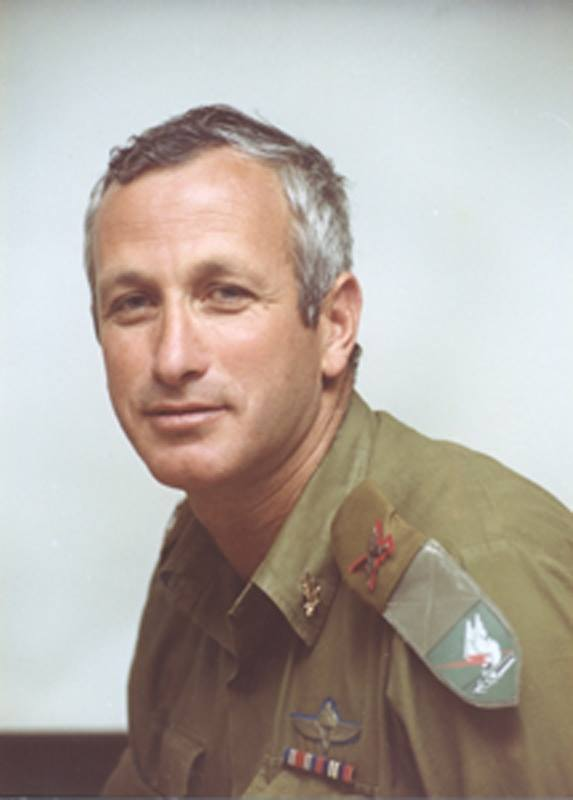
Brigadier General Rubin as the commander of Lahav Formation, 1983

Doron Rubin (Hebrew: דורון רובין; 1944 – 20 January 2018) was an Israeli general. He was head of the Israeli Defense Forces' Instruction and Doctrine Directorate and commander of the headquarters for special operations.

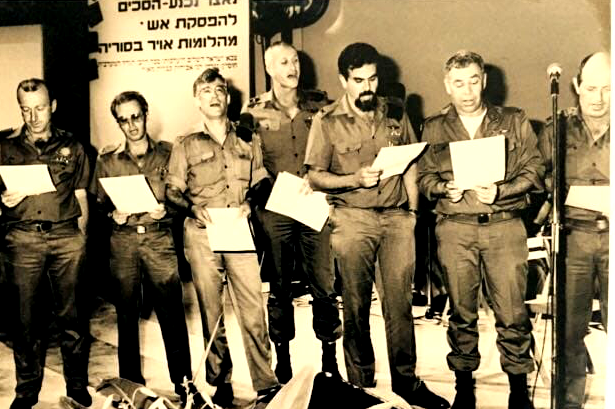
The choir of General Staff members at the IDF assembly marking twenty years since the Six-Day War - June 1987. From right to left: Major General Yossi Peled, Brigadier General Hagai Regev, Brigadier General Azriel Nevo, Major General Doron Rubin, Brigadier General Reuven Hershko, Brigadier General Efraim Lapid, Major General Uri Sagie.

== Biography ==
Doron Rubin was born in the moshav Beit Yosef. He was a member of the Bnei HaMoshavim Movement and the United Movement. He played as a defender and captain of the football team Hapoel Acre.

In May 1963, he enlisted in the IDF, volunteering for service in the Paratroopers Brigade, and was assigned to the 890th Battalion. He completed training as a combat soldier, the Infantry Commanders Course, and the Infantry Officers Course, which he completed with distinction. He served for about a year as an instructor at Officer Training School (Bahad 1) before returning to the Paratroopers Brigade as a platoon commander in the Sergeant Company of the 890th Battalion. During the Six-Day War, he fought as a company commander in the battalion. After the war, his company conducted the first paratroopers' swearing-in ceremony at the Western Wall. During the War of Attrition, he participated in Operation Rooster 53, and, as deputy battalion commander of the Nahal Airborne (50th Battalion), led "Operation Shefat 37" in 1970, where his unit fired mortars at a Syrian military training base approximately 70 km northeast of Damascus, and he commanded "Operation Rooster 59," where paratroopers attacked an Egyptian military logistics base near the Bir Arida airfield.

In 1972, he was appointed commander of 450th Battalion (the Paratroopers Brigade's training battalion) and participated in "Operation Bardas 54–55." and in Operation Spring of Youth. In September of that year, he commanded a force during Operation Kalamant 4 Extended in Lebanon. In 1973, three months before the Yom Kippur War, he was appointed commander of 202nd Battalion, a role he fulfilled during the war, commanding the battalion in the Battle of Wadi Mabouk, and, after the war, in the Battles of Mount Hermon.

He served as the operations officer of the Northern Command and undertook two years of study at the École Spéciale Militaire de Saint-Cyr in Paris. Upon his return in 1977, the Chief of Staff Mordechai Gur offered him command of the Golani Brigade, but Rubin declined. He was promoted to the rank of Colonel and appointed commander of the IDF Officer Training School. During Operation Litani in 1978, he commanded a force from the Officer Training School that captured Taibeh and Ghandourieh, and he was responsible for killing about nineteen militants.

From 1979 to 1981, he commanded the Regular Paratroopers Brigade. As the brigade commander, he led the brigade in a series of raids in Lebanon, including Operation Blood Man, the first helicopter-borne raid in Lebanon, Operation Moved, and Operation Segal. After transitioning to the IDF Armored Corps, he was appointed commander of 500th Armored Brigade (Kfir Formation), only three days before the outbreak of Operation Peace for Galilee. During the war, in the Battle of Ain Zahalta, a jeep carrying three IDF officers crossed the road leading into the village and entered territory controlled by Syrian commandos. Rubin entered the village with one of the battalion commanders and his radio operator to locate the officers; his two colleagues withdrew, leaving Rubin alone in the village, where he killed numerous Syrian soldiers. A reserve paratrooper unit later joined him and extracted him along with the bodies of the officers. After the war, he was appointed commander of the Lahav Formation, a reserve armored division.

In 1983, he was appointed commander of the 162nd Division (Steel Formation), commanding the eastern sector in Lebanon until the IDF's withdrawal in 1985. In his next role, he headed the Doctrine and Development Division at the Ground Forces Command. In this capacity, he initiated, based on the lessons of anti-tank warfare developed after the Yom Kippur and Lebanon wars, the establishment of Maglan Unit in January 1986, specializing in anti-tank warfare using advanced weaponry. In January 1987, he was promoted to the rank of Major General (Aluf) and appointed head of the IDF Training Division at the General Staff. During his tenure, he implemented the "Barak Program" for training junior officers in the IDF.

In early December 1988, he commanded the Depth Command from a command post on a ship at sea during Operation Blue and Brown in the town of Nuaimah in southern Lebanon. According to Rubin, he took responsibility for the operation's unsatisfactory results, and this accountability led to the end of his military career. Many of the generals in the General Staff criticized Chief of Staff Ehud Barak for forcing Rubin to leave the IDF. In 1991, he retired from the IDF after 28 years of service.

=== Post-IDF career ===
After his retirement from the IDF, Rubin turned to entrepreneurship and business. Initially, he partnered with a company for oil exploration. He later transitioned to managing and promoting various real estate projects in partnership with businessmen David Appel and Dror Hoter-Yishai.

In parallel to his business activities, in 1998, Rubin ran for Mayor of Tel Aviv-Yafo. He led an independent list, supported by Prime Minister Benjamin Netanyahu and funded by the Likud party. However, after a few weeks, Rubin was informed that while Likud continued to support his candidacy, it ceased to finance his campaign. Rubin received 25 percent of the votes but was defeated by Ron Huldai. He served as a member of the Tel Aviv-Yafo City Council for two years.

Due to the halt in campaign financing by Likud, Rubin had to fund his campaign from his own resources. These expenses, combined with debts accrued from his private business ventures, led to lawsuits with substantial claims filed against him and his wife. As a result, Rubin relocated his business operations to Honduras, where he developed real estate projects.

In the early 21st century, Rubin continued his business endeavors but faced challenges that eventually led to his declaration of bankruptcy. In an interview, Rubin revealed the chain of events leading to his financial collapse, debts, and bankruptcy.

He also served as chairman of the Football Referees Association, between 1998 and 1999.

In his later years, he headed a company connecting customers with automobile distributors.

Rubin held a degree in Middle Eastern studies from Tel Aviv University and was a graduate of the National Defense College.

Rubin died on January 19, 2018, at the age of 73. He was married to Hagar, had four sons, and lived in Har Adar. His son Nir appeared in the documentary film "Every Mother Shall Know," which covers the Second Lebanon War. Another son, Barak, commanded the Nahal Reconnaissance Unit during that war.

His friends erected a memorial in his honor near the Officers’ Pit. The memorial overlooks Bahad 1, which he commanded.
