= Itai Veruv =

Israeli general

- איתי וירוב
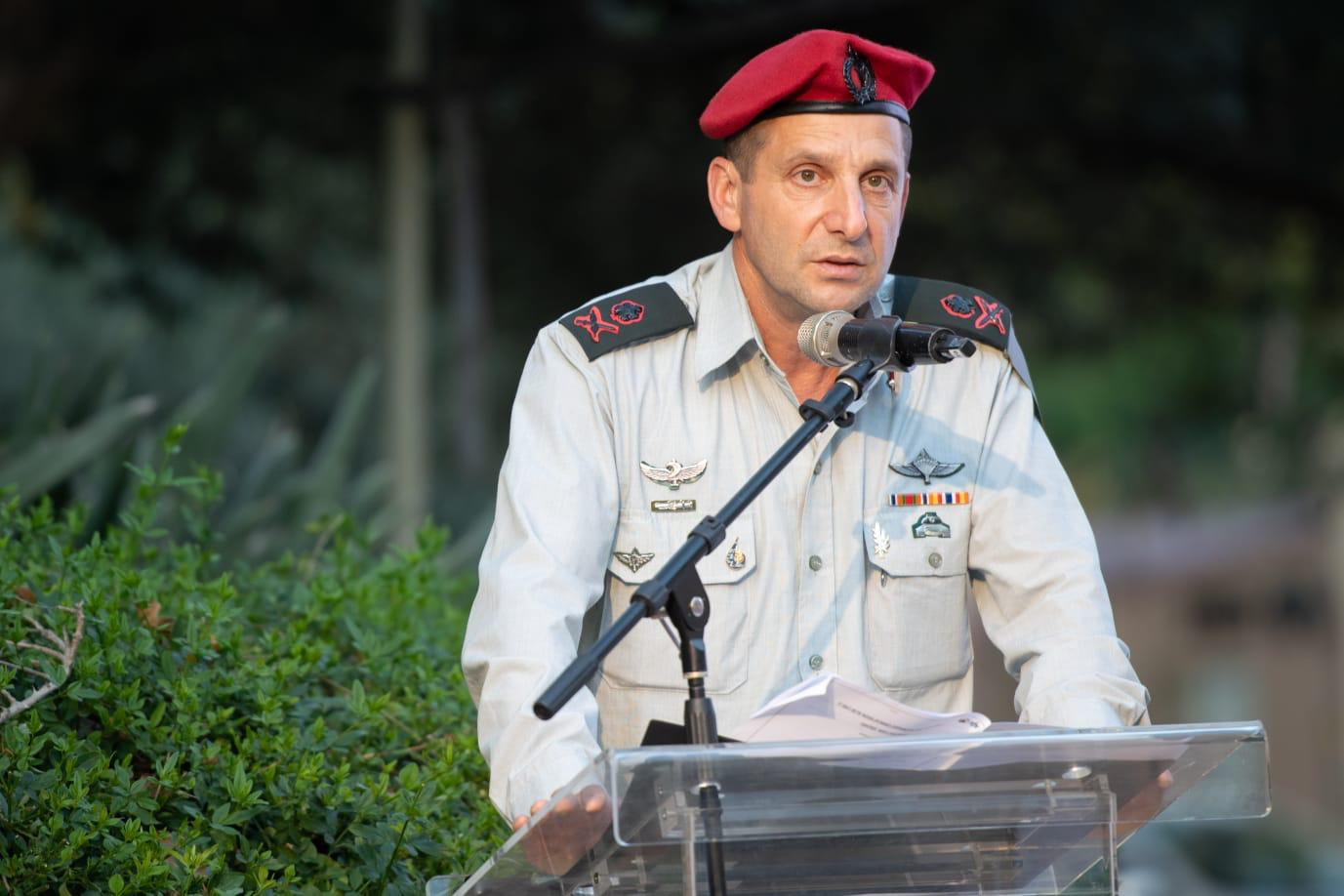
- Born: April 14, 1966 (age 60); Ramat HaKovesh, Israel
- Military career
- Allegiance: Israel
- Branch: Israel Defense Forces
- Service years: 1985–present
- Rank: Aluf (Major general)
- Unit: 35th Paratroopers Brigade
- Commands: 101st "Peten" (Elapidae) paratroop battalion, 55th Paratroopers Brigade, 900th "Kfir" Brigade, 143rd 'Gaza' Division
- Conflicts: South Lebanon conflict (1985–2000); First Intifada; Second Intifada; Operation Defensive Shield; 2006 Lebanon War; Operation Cast Lead; Operation Pillar of Defense; Operation Protective Edge

Itai Veruv (Hebrew: איתי וירוב; born April 14, 1966) is a Major General (aluf) who is currently serving as the Commander of the Israel Defense Forces Depth Corps and Commander of the IDF Military Colleges. He previously served as Chief of Staff of the Ground Forces, Commander of the Gaza Division, Chief of the Infantry and Paratroopers Corps, and Commander of the Kfir Brigade.

== Biography ==
Veruv was born and raised on Kibbutz Ramat HaKovesh. He was drafted into the IDF in 1985. He volunteered as a paratrooper in the Paratroopers Brigade, and in 1985 volunteered for a parachuting battalion in the Nahal Brigade. He underwent a combat training course, combat commanders’ course, and combat officer training school. Following the course, he returned to the parachuting unit battalion of the Nahal Brigade as a platoon commander. In August 1989, he was promoted to company commander within the battalion. In 1991, he was promoted to company commander in a different role in the 101st Battalion.

In 1992, he was promoted to deputy commander of the Paratroopers Brigade training base. Following this, he was promoted to operations officer of the Paratroopers Brigade. Afterwards, he completed training in the Armored Corps, studies in the Command and Staff College, and received a B.A. in finance from Bar-Ilan University.

In 1997, he was promoted to the rank of lieutenant colonel and became commander of the 101st Battalion. He served in this role until 1999. He led the unit, among other operations, in the fighting against Hezbollah in Southern Lebanon.

In 1999, he was promoted to commander of the Paratroopers Brigade training base and served in this role until 2001. Afterwards, he we went to study for a master's degree in military strategy at the Royal College of Defence Studies (RCDS) in the United Kingdom.

In 2003, he was promoted to the rank of colonel and became commander of a Northern Border Regional Brigade. In 2005, he stepped into his role as commander of the Tactical Command Academy and simultaneously as the commander of the 55th Brigade, where he served until 2007. This period included the events of the Second Lebanon War.

On August 5, 2007, he became the commander of the Kfir Brigade and served in this role until August 20, 2009. Following studies in the Israel National Defense College, he again served as commander of the 55th Brigade and company commanders’ course.

On January 23, 2012, he was promoted to the rank of brigadier general and commander of the company commanders' course, while simultaneously commanding a project in the Ground Forces. On September 13, 2012, he became chief of the Infantry and Paratroopers Corps.

On August 31, 2014, he became the commander of the Gaza Division. At the beginning of July, 2016, he became the Ground Forces Chief of Staff.

On March 10, 2019, he was promoted to the rank of major general, and on March 11, became commander of the IDF Military Colleges unit. On August 18, 2020, in addition to his current role, he became commander of the IDF Depth Corps.
