= Itai =

Hebrew and Shona name

- Pronunciation: ee-tai
- Gender: masculine
- Language: Hebrew

Origin
- Origin: biblical

Other names
- Alternative spelling: Itahy; Ittai; Ittay; Etay; Eitay; Itay; Ytai; Etai; Itaj; Eatai

Itai (Hebrew: אִתַּי, pronounced: ee-tai) is a masculine given name of Hebrew origin, and also a Shona name. The name can also be written: Itai, Itahy, Ittai, Ittay, Etay, Eitay, Itay, Ytai, Etai, Itaj, Ithai, or Eatai.

== Hebrew name ==
Itai is a Biblical name that appears in the Books of Samuel (see below) and a very common name for men in Israel. In recent years Itai has become one of the most common names for boys in that country. Sometimes, in order to strengthen the connection to the Land of Israel of a baby who was converted to Judaism, or to bless a Jew who has become very ill, it is considered acceptable to change his name to Itai. This name is often explained as an acronym of "If I forget thee, O Jerusalem, let my right hand forget her cunning" (Psalms, 137:5)- "אם אשכחך ירושלים, תשכח ימיני" ("Im Eshkakhekh Yerushalaiym Tishkakh Yemini") or "Land of Israel, Torah of Israel"- "ארץ ישראל, תורת ישראל" ("Eretz YIsrael, Torat YIsrael").

Itai is the name of two Biblical characters: Itai HaGiti (Itai of Gath) and Itai Ben-Rivai.

=== Itai HaGiti (Ittai the Gittite) ===
Itai HaGiti was a general in King David's Army. He was a Philistine from the city of Gath next to Ashkelon. He is likely one of the Philistine leaders who joined David's band during his exile from Israel during King Saul's time. It is also notable that David's first "battlefield kill," Goliath, was also a Gittite, from Gath, one of the five principal cities of Philistines. He is one of few military leaders who stayed loyal to David, during the rebellion of Absalom. Itai led one third of David's Army during the Battle of the Wood of Ephraim against Absalom, according to 2 Samuel 18:02. He is also named the commander of the Cherethites and Pelethites, who were the Royal Guards of King David.

The Biblical story in Samuel II, Chapter 15:19-22 states: As King David flees from Absolom, David tells Itai it is wiser not to follow him. Itai acknowledges the wisdom of King David but chooses to go with him.

Samuel II, Chapter 15: "(19) Then said the king to Itai the Gittite: 'Wherefore goest thou also with us? return, and abide with the king; for thou art a foreigner, and also an exile from thine own place. (20) Whereas thou camest but yesterday, should I this day make thee go up and down with us, seeing I go whither I may? return thou, and take back thy brethren with thee in kindness and truth.' (21) And Itai answered the king, and said: 'As the LORD liveth, and as my lord the king liveth, surely in what place my lord the king shall be, whether for death or for life, even there also will thy servant be.' (22) And David said to Itai: 'Go and pass over.' And Itai the Gittite passed over, and all his men, and all the little ones that were with him".

=== Itai Ben Rivai ===
In 2 Samuel Chapter 23: "(8) These are the names of the mighty men whom David had:...(29)...Itai the son of Ribai of Gibeah of the children of Benjamin;".

In 1 Chronicles Chapter 11: "(10) Now these are the chief of the mighty men whom David had, who held strongly with him in his kingdom, together with all Israel, to make him king, according to the word of the LORD concerning Israel. (31) Ithai the son of Ribai of Gibeah of the children of Benjamin."

== Shona name ==
Itai is a Shona name, pronounced ("ee-tai"). The gender of the name usually depends on the spelling. As a masculine name it is usually spelt "Itai" and as a feminine name it is spelt 'Itayi". There is not much general difference in the two but a slight heaviness in the feminine version to emphasise the "y". But in the popular teenage culture of Zimbabwe this slight difference is often ignored.

The word itself loosely translates to "will" or "do as you/we please". The exact meaning is subjective, with positive or negative connotations. The first, positive, meaning is that of a proud person/family with free will. The second, negative, meaning is that of a persecuted person/family surrendering their will to their persecutor. Whether the first or the second meaning is implied is usually dictated by a person's family background. Those born into good fortune usually bear the positive whilst those born into poverty usually bear the negative.

Itai is the title for the leader of Afe Annang, the leader of the governing council of Annang people of the Akwa Akpa kingdom of Nigeria.

== Notable people ==
- Itai Anghel (born 1968), Israeli correspondent and documentary filmmaker
- Itai Benjamini, Israeli mathematician at the Weizmann Institute of Science
- Itai Chammah (born 1985), Israeli Olympic swimmer
- Itai Hagman (born 1983), Argentine economist and politician
- Itai Keisuke (1956–2018), Japanese sumo wrestler
- Itai Maggidi (born 1981), Israeli long-distance runner
- Itai Veruv (born 1966), Israeli general
- Itai Yanai (born 1975), American-Israeli biomedical scientist at the New York University Grossman School of Medicine

== See also ==
- Itay
