= Shay Avital =

Israeli general

- שי אביטל
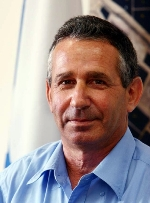
- Shay Avital, 2011
- Born: 1952 (age 73–74); Moshav Arbel, Israel
- Military career
- Allegiance: Israel
- Branch: Israel Defense Forces
- Service years: 1970–2002, 2012–2014
- Rank: Aluf / Major General
- Commands: Sayeret Matkal; Battalion Commander in the 188th Brigade; Reserves Brigade; Ephraim Territorial Brigade; 36th Armored Division; Chief of Staff of IDF Northern; Northern Corpus; Depth Corps
- Conflicts: Yom Kippur War; 1982 Lebanon War; 1982-2000 South Lebanon conflict; First Intifada; Second Intifada
- Other work: Former Director General of the Israeli Ministry of the Environment

Shay Avital Rapoport (Hebrew: שי אביטל; born in 1952) is a Major General (Ret.) in the IDF and former head of the Special Operations Forces Command (Depth Corps).

During his military career Avital was, among others, Commander of Sayeret Matkal, the 36th Armored Division and the Northern Corpus.

== Military service ==
Avital enlisted to the IDF in 1970 and volunteered to serve in Sayeret Matkal (The General Staff Reconnaissance Unit). After completing a paratroopers' basic training, he began the advanced infantry training route with the Unit. The trainee's Company Commander at the time was Yoni Netanyahu, by whom Avital has said to have been greatly influenced. With the completion of the course Avital began an officer's training course at the completion of which he returned to the Unit as Squad Commander. Avital who was also inspired by Meir Har Zion, used to read to his soldiers passages from Har-Zion's journal, and invited Har Zion to speak before Avital's soldiers.

During the Yom Kippur War, Avital, along with his regiment, fought in the Golan Heights and the Egyptian front. Sayeret Matkal was called to the Heights on the second day of the war, taking part in the fighting as the elite reconnaissance unit of the 36th Division under Refael Eitan. On October 9, the unit, under the command of Yoni Netanyahu, was called to camp Nafah following an announcement of a penetration of helicopters landing Syrian commando fighters near the base.

Avital has testified that it had been a tough battle; one which included close range gunfire and grenade launches, and was ultimately determined due to the confidence and personal example demonstrated by Netanyahu in battle. During the clash between the Matkal Unit and the Syrian commando, about forty Syrian fighters were killed and two Matkal fighters lost their lives. Avital also participated in the rescue operation in which the Matkal force, commanded by Netanyahu, rescued during the fighting, the wounded Lieutenant Colonel (later Major General) Yossi Ben Hanan from Tel Shams. After which Avital and his men headed over to the southern front and participated in the fighting on the outskirts of Ismaïlia and the takeover of the Jebel Ataka.

In 1974 Avital participated in breaking into a residential unit in Beit Shean where three terrorists had barricaded themselves. All six Sayeret Matkal soldiers who participated in the break in, including Avital, were awarded by the then Defense Minister, Shimon Peres, a book of poems by Natan Alterman in recognition of their courage. In 1975 Avital participated in pursuit of a squad of four terrorists who had infiltrated from Lebanon to the Metula region. Avital confronted the terrorists by himself and killed them in a brief battle. That same year Avital also completed a patrol course of The United States Army Rangers School. In 1976 he was positioned in Kenya, training the guard forces of Prime Minister, Jomo Kenyatta, and helped organize Operation Entebbe's rescue forces' landing in Nairobi. Upon his return Avital was appointed the Commander of Sayeret Matkal's Designated Company. However, several months later he was severely injured in a car accident which caused disability in his right hand. Avital went through a long rehabilitation period during which he dedicated his time to academic studies.

In 1979 Avital returned to the Unit, filling a senior position. He participated in the takeover of the Infant day care during the Misgav Am hostage crisis in 1980. In March 1982 he was appointed Chief Commander of Sayeret Matkal. During his time as Chief Commander the Lebanon War broke out and Avital pushed to activate the unit as a regular infantry unit. During the war, Avital said, in a conference attended by the Defense Minister Ariel Sharon and the Chief of Staff Rafael Eitan, that he opposed the very idea of armored forces entry to Beirut, it being the capital of a neighboring country. Yet Avital said should it be decided to enter the city, he will lead his troops in the operation. A few days before Omer Bar Lev replaced him in the position, Avital participated in the rescue of the kidnapped hostages in line 300.

After a year of study at the Marine Corps Command and Staff College in Quantico, Virginia, Avital joined the Armored Corps in 1986 and was appointed the Commander of the 74th Battalion of the 188th Brigade. Later he would command a reserves Brigade, and the Ephraim Territorial Brigade. Avital left to study in Boston in 1990 and upon his return he was appointed Commander of the 211th Armored Brigade, served as Deputy Commander of 36th Armored Division and was promoted to Brigadier General and Commander of the 98th Paratroopers Division.

In 1994 Avital was appointed Commander of the 36th Armored Division, and later served as Chief of Staff of the Northern Command, and as the Northern Corpus Commander in the rank of major general. In 2000 he was, by virtue of his experience in Special Forces, head of the Inquiry Commission regarding the Duvdevan Unit's friendly fire operational failure – (when soldiers are hit by gunfire from the force to which they belong). The incident occurred while trying to arrest the engineer Mahmoud Abu Hunud, who was then named number 1 most wanted in the West Bank and belonged to Hamas' military wing Izz ad-Din al-Qassam.

During the operation, which took place in the village Asira ash-Shamaliya, three of the unit's snipers mistakenly took their own team members who were lying on the roof in the area of operation to be terrorists and shot them dead. Following the operational failure it was decided to temporarily suspend the unit from operations and its Commander at the time - Mickey Edelstein resigned.

At the beginning of the al-Aqsa Intifada, acting as the advisor on terrorism to the Chief of General Staff, Avital submitted a report on streamlining the civil and military operations against the Palestinians, in which he recommended to split the control of the West Bank fighting to another Division (A few months later the Judea Division was founded and took over for some of the routine security missions in the sector), and the increased cooperation between the IDF and the Shin Bet.

Avital served as a staff commanding officer in the Northern Command overseeing the operations of the Egoz Unit, Unit 504 and the Lebanon Liaison Unit among others. He is disabled and therefore requires a specially modified attachment to his rifle's rotating bolt in order to load it. He survived at least one life-threatening car accident in the late 1990s while in IDF service. He is considered one of the brightest and most talented officers in the IDF and in its history. In 2002, Avital retired from the IDF.

== Public life ==
Towards the seventeenth Knesset elections, Avital was placed 39th in the Kadima list, and was not elected to the Knesset. On July 19, 2006, he was appointed Director General of the Ministry of Environmental Protection and served in this capacity until that government's end of the term, in April 2009.

== Back to service ==
In December 2011, the Chief of General Staff Benny Gantz ordered the formation of the Depth Corps for joint operations in the strategic depth, and appointed Major General Avital as head of the corps.

In September 2014, Avital retired from the IDF.

== Personal life ==
Avital was born and raised in Moshav Arbel, and studied at the 'Kadoorie' agricultural school. Avital, a husband and father of four, lives to this day in Arbel. He holds a BA (cum laude) in Soil and Water sciences and in Agricultural Economics and Management from the Faculty of Agriculture of the Hebrew University, and has a degree (MPA) in Public Administration from the Kennedy School of Government in Harvard University where he studied as Member of the Wexner Israel Fellowship Program (Wexner Foundation).

== Notes ==
1. The testimony of Shay Avital in the movie 'Yoni Netanyahu - the real story': "He was my first senior commander, to me, a company commander that was not only the commander, he also was an educator. He worked us hard. When you had to be tough he was tough. He demanded a lot from us. He was not an easy commander, but at the same time, for example before going on a difficult journey of sometimes 80 kilometers, carrying a weight of 15-20 kilos on our backs, Yoni would go from soldier to soldier and ask each one how he was, and most of the time the men quietly returned back in line. I mean he persuaded them not with orders but by putting a good word. It is the eve of Chanukah, we are tired, and Yoni sits with the company the whole evening telling us about Judas Maccabeus. He talked about the history of the Jews two thousand years ago. He connected the story of their actions with ours today. He finished his lecture and we continued to run on the trails into the night, until two - three in the morning, and of course the next day we slept three hours and continued our training at six in the morning. "
2. Moshe Zonder, Sayeret Matkel, Keter Publishing House, 2000. The Shay Avital Period, pages 197–198.
3. Testimony of the retired Major General Shay Avital on the battle against the Syrian commando, from the official site in memory of Lt. Col. Yonatan Netanyahu.
4. The DSO awarded to Jonathan Netanyahu, on the "Courage" website of the IDF Personnel Branch
5. Moshe Zonder, Sayeret Matkel, Keter Publishing House, 2000. The Amiram Levine Period, page 201.
6. Noam Tivon: "Only when I got to SO I found that in Shlom HaGalil we were at the centre of doings. As a soldier it did not really interest me. We fought against the Syrian commandos in Mioeret', we were in Ein a'-Tina, the breaking into Beirut, the funniest thing is that Avital, Commander of the Unit, put us young ones in the flanks so as not to endanger us and eventually we were the ones who were tackled. "Avihai Becker, Pleasant way, Haaretz newspaper, 5 May 2000.
7. Moshe Zonder, The man who didn't say "After me", Nrg Maariv, 2 June 2000
8. Omri Asnheim, Red Background, Nrg Maariv, April 15, 2005
9. Shai Lahav, Surgical Unit, Nrg Maariv, May 1, 2003
10. Avihai Becker, Who is general Yitzhak Eitan?, Haaretz newspaper, 17 November 2000
11. Amir Oren, Today in Tel Aviv - strategic talks with the U.S., Walla! web site, November 15, 2001
12. Anshel Pfeffer, Israel announces new 'depth' command for long-range military operations, Haaretz newspaper, 15 December 2011.
