= Britten Pears Arts =

Music education charity in Suffolk, England

- Nickname: Britten-Pears Arts
- Named after: Benjamin Britten and Peter Pears
- Formation: April 2020
- Founded at: Aldeburgh and Snape in Suffolk
- Merger of: Snape Maltings and Britten-Pears Foundation
- Type: Nonprofit
- Legal status: Charity
- Locations: Snape Maltings Concert Hall, Snape, Suffolk, England; The Red House Golf Lane, Aldeburgh, Suffolk, England
- Website: brittenpearsarts.org
- Formerly called: Snape Maltings; Aldeburgh Music; Britten-Pears Foundation

Britten Pears Arts is a large music education organisation based in Suffolk, England. It aims to continue the legacy of composer Benjamin Britten and his partner, singer Peter Pears, and to promote the enjoyment and experience of music for all. It is a registered charity.

The charity manages two historic locations on the Suffolk coast: Snape Maltings Concert Hall, a converted Victorian malting building on the edge of the River Alde in the village of Snape, Suffolk, and The Red House, the former home of Benjamin Britten and Peter Pears. The organisation was founded by Benjamin Britten, Peter Pears and Eric Crozier in 1947 as an organisation to present the first Aldeburgh Festival of Music and the Arts in 1948.

Each year Britten Pears Arts promotes the Aldeburgh Festival of Music and the Arts, the Snape Proms, concert series at Easter and October, together with a year-round performance programme at Snape Maltings Concert Hall and other venues on the Snape site. The Britten Pears Young Artist Programme, formerly known as the Britten–Pears School for Advanced Musical Studies, provides development opportunities for musicians early in their professional lives, between the ages of 18 and 25. Aldeburgh Young Musicians offers a programme of music mentoring for "promising young musicians" aged 10–18. Aldeburgh Education offers an annual programme of work involving the wider community, while Aldeburgh Residencies provides opportunities for established artists to develop their creative talents.

== History ==
While touring with the English Opera Group in Europe in 1947, the composer Benjamin Britten, tenor Peter Pears and producer Eric Crozier developed the idea of a music festival in Aldeburgh, where Britten had a house on Crag Path. An executive committee was formed under the chairmanship of the Countess of Cranbrook and the first meeting took place at Thellusson Lodge, Aldeburgh on 27 October 1947. The first Aldeburgh Festival of Music and the Arts was held from 5 to 12 June 1948, under the Artistic Direction of Britten, Pears and Crozier, with the Earl of Harewood as president and Elizabeth Sweeting as general manager.

Needing to expand the Festival into larger premises, in 1967, the Festival management acquired a lease on disused Victorian buildings at Snape Maltings, and converted the largest of the redundant malthouses into Snape Maltings Concert Hall. The Snape Maltings Foundation Ltd was incorporated as a company limited by guarantee, no. 980281, on 21 May 1970 under the name of Snape Maltings Foundation Ltd. to manage the Snape buildings and develop further buildings on the site. The initial subscribers were Benjamin Britten, Peter Pears, Imogen Holst, Fidelity, Countess of Cranbrook, Marion, Countess of Harewood, Charles Gifford and The Lord Goodman. The company was registered with the Charity Commission as the Aldeburgh Foundation, registration number 261383, on 23 July 1970. The company changed its name to Aldeburgh Festival–Snape Maltings Foundation Ltd (known as AF-SMF) on 7 September 1976, and to Aldeburgh Foundation on 12 October 1983. In November 1997, the name of the company was changed to Aldeburgh Productions, and from July 2006 until the merger in April 2020 it had the name Aldeburgh Music.

== Background and ethos ==
Following its successful launch in 1948, the Aldeburgh Festival expanded year by year until it outgrew the available venues in the town. When redundant malting buildings in Snape became available in 1965, an initial 25-year lease was taken on the largest of the Victorian malthouses, and it was converted by Arup Associates (architects and engineers) and Wm. C. Reade (builders) into Snape Maltings Concert Hall. The 820-seat Hall was opened by HM The Queen on 2 June 1967. From that date, the main events of the annual Festival were relocated to Snape Maltings Concert Hall. A major fire in 1969 led to the re-development of the site, re-opening the following year, and gradually what was once a Concert Hall for a three-week Festival, became a year-round venue, including the introduction in the 1980s of the annual Snape Proms.

From the very beginning, part of the artistic vision of the original directors had been the development of young musical talent. As early as 1953, Britten and Pears, committed to the musical development of young people, formed the idea of having a school of music at Snape. The fundamental concept was "to prepare and promote young singers or string players for professional life at the very highest level." It took until September 1972 for the first masterclasses to be given, by Pears, and in 1975 a Snape Maltings Training Orchestra rehearsed and performed at the Hall for the first time. Following the death of Britten in 1976, the Benjamin Britten Memorial Appeal was launched, and the barley store adjacent to the Concert Hall was converted by Arup Associates into the Britten–Pears School for Advanced Musical Studies. Opened on 28 April 1979 by the patron of the Aldeburgh Foundation, HM Queen Elizabeth the Queen Mother, the School incorporated a 120-seat recital room (today named the Peter Pears Recital Room), a top-floor Seminar Room, with many practice rooms in between and a reference library, the Holst Library.

Over the years, such artists as Dame Joan Sutherland, Ann Murray, Sir Thomas Allen, Galina Vishnevskaya, Murray Perahia, Sir Charles Mackerras, Elisabeth Söderström and Dawn Upshaw as well as Pears himself have been notable teachers, while its many alumni have included Thomas Adès, Ian Bostridge, Simon Keenlyside and Dame Felicity Lott.

From the beginning, the Festival was committed to working with and for its local community, breaking down the barriers between amateur and professional. Education and working with young people always featured, and this continues today with Aldeburgh Education involving the local community as creators and performers as well as audiences. The department now runs 3 year-round programmes and in 2011–12 delivered 432 sessions, with over 15,000 participants, over 17,000 audience members and 147 artists. In 2012 the annual Celebration of Schools’ Music, presented in association with Suffolk County Council, celebrated its 25th year at Snape Maltings Concert Hall.

Aldeburgh Residencies was launched in 2003 to offer bespoke development opportunities to established artists. The Residencies enable individuals and ensembles to come to Snape to create new work, develop new partnerships and explore new possibilities.

Aldeburgh Young Musicians is a Centre for Advanced Training (CAT), created in 2007 with funding from the government to provide advanced music mentoring for exceptionally talented young musicians aged between 8 and 18 based in the Eastern Region.

The growth of the work of Aldeburgh Music led to the need for more accommodation, and further semi-derelict buildings adjacent to the Concert Hall on the Snape Maltings site were acquired in 2006 on a 999-year lease, and the Aldeburgh Music Development Plan launched to raise the money necessary for their conversion. Following a successful £16 million fund-raising campaign, a new Creative Campus was opened in May 2009, designed by architects Haworth Tompkins. The Hoffmann Building contains the Britten Studio (capacity 340), the Jerwood Kiln Studio (capacity 80) and a number of rehearsal spaces. The Britten–Pears Building has been redeveloped and now incorporates the Trask Artists’ Cafe. A small studio has been created out of the derelict Victorian Dovecote. In Aldeburgh, the Pumphouse, Aldeburgh Music's small alternative venue, has been redeveloped.

== Aldeburgh Music Today ==
The Aldeburgh Festival of Music and the Arts remains at the core of Aldeburgh Music's annual programme. Artistic directors of the Aldeburgh Festival have included composer Thomas Ades (1999-2008) and from 2009 to 2016 Pierre-Laurent Aimard.

Traditionally starting on the second Friday in June and running for 17 days, events are presented not only in the various venues at Snape Maltings, but in all the traditional Festival venues such as Aldeburgh Parish Church, Orford Church, Blythburgh Church and the Festival's original home, Aldeburgh’s Jubilee Hall. Site-specific events have taken place elsewhere, such as Sizewell Beach (Everlasting Night, 2011), Leiston Long Shop Museum (Before Life and After, 2012), RAF Bentwaters Airbase (Faster than Sound), and community events on the beach. The Pumphouse, situated off the marshes on the outskirts of the town, provides an informal, alternative performance venue.

Although Britten’s work always features in the Festival – and played a large role in 2013, his centenary year – it by no means dominates the programme, which continues to commission and present new work from contemporary composers, as well as exploring themes across many genres. The Festival's Artists in Residence have included composer-conductor Oliver Knussen, a former artistic director of the Festival, in 2012, and composer George Benjamin in 2015. Previous contemporary composers to be examined in depth in recent festivals include György Ligeti and Marco Stroppa (2011), George Benjamin and Pierre Boulez (2010), Harrison Birtwistle and Elliott Carter (2009) and György Kurtág (2008).

Festivals also include work by the Britten Pears Young Artist Programme, including Britten–Pears Alumni. A programme of fringe events takes place at The Pumphouse in Aldeburgh.

=== Snape Proms ===
The Snape Proms take place throughout August each year in the Concert Hall. Some seats in the main block are removed, and audiences sit on cushions on the floor. With a different concert each evening throughout the month, the Proms present an eclectic range of music, including classical, jazz, folk and world music, and incorporate comedy and poetry.

=== Easter Festival ===
An Easter Festival is mounted each year, together with an autumn weekend generally themed around the work of Benjamin Britten.

=== Britten–Pears Young Artist Programme ===
Since the very first course in 1972, over 10,000 young artists have attended what started as the Britten–Pears School for Advanced Musical Studies, and is now called the Britten Pears Young Artist Programme. Masterclasses for singers, ensembles, instrumentalists and composers are held from March until October. There are also opportunities for emerging young professional musicians to work with conductors, soloists and orchestral principals in both the Britten–Pears Orchestra and the Britten–Pears Baroque Orchestra. Many of the masterclasses are open to the public, and each course culminates in a public performance, including at the Aldeburgh Festival and Snape Proms. Auditions are held across the world, now using modern technology to access countries on the other side of the globe. Previous conductors of the BPO include Edward Gardner, Oliver Knussen, Kirill Karabits, Vasily Petrenko and Robin Ticciati. The Britten–Pears Baroque Orchestra, formed in 1992, is formed each year to work on baroque repertoire, and previous tutors have included period specialists Richard Egarr, Emmanuelle Haïm, Laurence Cummings, Andreas Scholl and Harry Bicket.

Singers are auditioned for song recital courses, and recent courses have included American and French song with Dawn Upshaw. Singers and orchestra come together to perform opera; recent productions have included Death in Venice and Albert Herring, and Poulenc’s Les Mamelles de Tiresias in Britten’s arrangement.

Each year there is a digital media course, called New Music/New Media. String quartets come together each spring and present a weekly recital of "work-in-progress" at the Jubilee Hall, and in late summer the International Academy of String Quartets provides further opportunities for working on repertoire. Menahem Pressler, Pierre-Laurent Aimard and the Arditti Quartet have all taught masterclasses.

=== Aldeburgh Residencies ===
Aldeburgh Residencies are designed for established musicians and other artists. It is intended for the development of specific creative projects, each generally lasting for a week – longer, sometimes, in the case of composers.

Groups or individuals are generally funded by Aldeburgh Music for their accommodation, food and travel, and are expected to allow some public access to the work being undertaken. This may be in the form of an informal Open Session performance, but may also be a full performance in an upcoming Aldeburgh Festival or concert series. Residencies are supported by the John Ellerman Foundation.

Artists to benefit from an Aldeburgh Residency include Mark Padmore, Gwyneth Herbert, Netia Jones, HAUI, Pippa Nissen, I Fagiolini, Exaudi, Alex Wilson (working on a new collaboration with two Malian musicians, preparing for a tour and new CD), the Aurora Orchestra, Mitsuko Uchida and Katie Mitchell.

A particular strand of Aldeburgh Residencies entitled the Composer Residency Scheme enables three composers each year to spend three weeks working on individual new projects. Amongst the composers and librettists participating in this programme have been Anna Meredith, Larry Groves, Simon Limbrick, Mark Ravenhill and Conor Mitchell, Man Fang, Tansy Davies, Christian Mason and Charlotte Bray.

=== Jerwood Opera Writing Programme ===
The Jerwood Opera Writing Programme develops new work in the field of opera. The first Jerwood Opera Writing Foundation, led by Artistic Advisor Giorgio Battistelli and a distinguished faculty of experienced practitioners, featured three week-long workshops in March, July and October 2007. Ten of the participants were composers, mostly at the start of a professional career but with little or no experience in writing opera, while the remaining participants were a mix of poets, playwrights and directors with an interest in, but no experience at that stage of, writing libretti. In 2010, the second Jerwood Opera Writing Foundation course began, involving composers, writers and directors both in the UK and worldwide. The participants, twenty composers, writers and directors, took part in three week-long workshop-led courses at Snape Maltings in November 2010, March and July 2011. The workshops mixed practical exercises, theory and discussion, with contributions from teachers including Harrison Birtwistle, Stephen Langridge, Stephen Plaice, David Sawer, Lavinia Greenlaw, Jonathan Dove and Orlando Gough amongst others, and culminated in performances of mini music-theatre works created by the twenty participants.

At the end of November 2011, Aldeburgh Music invited applications for Jerwood Opera Writing Fellowships from composers and writers and their collaborators who wanted to develop a particular opera project for commission and performance. Fellowships were to give support during the development of a new opera by providing a collaborative, supportive environment, as well as financial and practical support and expertise, such as workshops and mentoring. Over sixty applications were submitted from countries worldwide and the following four proposals were each awarded a Jerwood Opera Writing Fellowship: Knots and Do-Nots – composer Sasha Siem and director Ted Huffman; Pleasure – composer Mark Simpson and writer Melanie Challenger; Thanatophobia – composer Joanna Lee and writer Hannah Silva; and Beyond the Pale – composer Benjamin Scheuer, writer Tom Swift and director Tom Creed.

=== Aldeburgh Education ===
Over 8,000 young people participate in Education projects each year. The latest initiative is Group A, a non-audition choir for young people of between the ages of 13 and 18, and The Big Shout, an opportunity for members of the community to come together to sing. Aldeburgh Education also devises training in participatory settings for artists at all levels.

Aldeburgh Education has been working with Suffolk County Council since 1987, and has been a lead partner in the Suffolk Music Education Hub since 2012. It has worked with HM YOI Warren Hill since 1999, and with Lapwing, an organisation providing individual learning programmes for young people who have complex barriers to learning, since 2009, as well as with a variety of local and national arts organizations around the UK and beyond including the development of audio/visual interactive media.

=== Aldeburgh Young Musicians ===
Aldeburgh Young Musicians (AYM) was created to fill the perceived gap in Aldeburgh Music's engagement with the musical development of younger people. Funded by the Department of Education, each of 45 young musicians between the ages of 8 and 18 has a tailored, individual learning programme, which co-ordinates individual lessons, intensive weekends and residential holiday courses, expert professional advice, mentoring and performance opportunities. Individual students are matched to tutors for additional tuition which can be done on-line. AYM works in partnership with Suffolk County Council Music Service, Pro Corda, Junior Guildhall School of Music and Drama and the Purcell School.

In 2011–12, new strands were added to the Aldeburgh Young Musicians programme: AYM Apprentices for younger students who have shown musical talent and potential but need further musical support and development before joining the main scheme; AYM Open House providing the opportunity to Aldeburgh Young Musicians to use rehearsal facilities with other AYMs, provide a venue for individual lessons or master-classes, a private practice space and specialist coaching days; and AYM Exchanging Worlds Ensemble, launched for the Cultural Olympiad 2012. This commissioning group is cross cultural and cross genre in content, working collaboratively and exchanging global musical conversations. Connected to the Aldeburgh World Orchestra and Cultural Olympiad, two AYM composers were commissioned to create a new fanfare to be performed by the Aldeburgh World Orchestra brass section for the Olympic Torch Relay, performed when the Relay travelled to Aldeburgh and Ipswich on 5 July 2012.

=== Faster than Sound ===
Faster than Sound is a strand of activity, supported by the Paul Hamlyn and Esmée Fairbairn Foundations, exploring connections between traditional music and new media, developing new collaborations between experimental musicians from different backgrounds, including electronic and classical. Starting in 2006 with performances in disused hangars at RAF Bentwaters, Faster than Sound, co-produced with Joana Seguro from Lumin, is now based in the Hoffmann Building at Snape Maltings. Since 2009, there have been five week-long residencies each year, culminating in a performance. Recent presentations include I Burn for You, a new music theatre piece based on Dracula, by Ian Wilson (composer) and Tom Creed (director); Symmetry with Marcus du Sautoy and Fall Back connecting the legacy of Dubstep with some of the earliest experiments in electronic music and projection. During the 2012 Aldeburgh Festival, choral ensemble EXAUDI teamed up with sound artist Bill Thompson and students from the University of East Anglia and presented a promenade performance in the Hoffmann Building of John Cage’s Song Books. Other Faster than Sound projects in 2012 include Star-Shaped Biscuit, text and music by David Toop, which will be performed in one of the remaining semi-derelict buildings at Snape Maltings. Later in 2012, composer Richard Baker and sound artist Brian Duffy collaborate on a new work exploring the hidden voices of electronic toys and toy instruments in combination with a small chamber ensemble.

=== TEDx Aldeburgh ===
TED is a US-led non-profit organisation devoted to Ideas Worth Spreading. It brings together in international conferences, people from the worlds of Technology, Entertainment and Design (TED).

Aldeburgh Music hosted the inaugural TEDx Aldeburgh Conference on 6 November 2010. Hosted by the TED music director Thomas Dolby and produced by Joana Seguro as an opportunity of having in one place great minds and explorers of contemporary music, the event featured talks by David Toop, Tod Machover, Martyn Ware, William Orbit, Tim Exile, Imogen Heap, Ash Nehru of United Visual Artists. In addition, there were TED talk videos from David Byrne, Itay Talgam, Evelyn Glennie and Benjamin Zander. The gathering of people and ideas coincided with Aldeburgh's New Music New Media course for emerging professional composers and musicians, led by Tod Machover. The second conference was held on 5 November 2011 when the speakers included Vincent Walsh, Peter Gregson, Kingslee Daly, Jennifer Stumm, Nitin Sawhney, Kathy Hinde and the Modified Toy Orchestra.

=== Visual Arts: SNAP ===
The Aldeburgh Festival has always included the visual arts as well as music, and a number of exhibitions are curated each year to accompany the music programme. From 2011, the main exhibition of contemporary art has been promoted under the title SNAP, at various locations around the Snape Maltings site, organized by Abigail Lane. In 2012, featured artists included Glenn Brown, May Cornet, Brian Eno, Ryan Gander, Maggi Hambling, Mark Limbrick, Emily Richardson and Gavin Turk.

Aldeburgh Music is also responsible for running the Peter Pears Gallery in Aldeburgh and the Pond Gallery at Snape Maltings. For most of the year these galleries are hired out to local artists, but provide the space for Aldeburgh Music-curated exhibitions during the Aldeburgh Festival.

== People ==
The first artistic directors of the Aldeburgh Festival were Benjamin Britten, Peter Pears and Eric Crozier. Britten and Pears remained artistic directors until their respective deaths, in 1976 and 1986. After Britten died, the artistic direction of the Festival was shared; many world-class musicians joined the artistic team, including at various times Philip Ledger, Colin Graham, Steuart Bedford, Mstislav Rostropovich, Murray Perahia, Simon Rattle, John Shirley-Quirk and Oliver Knussen. In 1999, a sole artistic director in the Britten mould – composer, solo performer, accompanist and conductor – was appointed in Thomas Adès, joined in 2004 by composer John Woolrich, first as Guest Artistic Director then as an Associate Artistic Director. Adès had first appeared at an Aldeburgh Festival as a member of the Britten–Pears Young Artist Programme on the New Music course in 1992. Adès was succeeded by Pierre-Laurent Aimard in 2009, again supported by John Woolrich. Oliver Knussen returned for the 2012 Festival as Artist in Residence.

Chief executive of Aldeburgh Music from 1998 to 2014 was Jonathan Reekie, who left in Spring 2014 to become Director of Somerset House Trust. He was succeeded by Roger Wright, CBE, the former Controller of BBC Radio 3, who took up the post in September 2014. Roger Wright left the role in Summer 2024 and was replaced as CEO by Andrew Comben.

The current Chairman of the Aldeburgh Music Council is Sir Simon Robey. The President of Aldeburgh Music is the Lord Stevenson of Coddenham CBE, Aldeburgh Music Chairman from 2000 to 2012.

== Music ==
The Britten–Pears Library holds an archive of programmes dating back to 1948. Aldeburgh Music has commissioned and presented many world premieres over the years, starting with many of Britten's own compositions from 1948.

A selection of composers whose works have been premiered by Aldeburgh Music include Thomas Adès, Gerald Barry, Richard Rodney Bennett, Harrison Birtwistle, Elliott Carter, Jonathan Dove, Deirdre Gribbin, Oliver Knussen, György Kurtág, Nicola LeFanu, Colin Matthews, Thea Musgrave, Dmitri Shostakovich and John Tavener.

== Facilities ==
Aldeburgh Music is based at Snape Maltings Concert Hall, Snape, Saxmundham, Suffolk. It now has a 999-year lease, negotiated with the overall site owners, Johnny and Alesha Gooderham, in 2006, on all its facilities at Snape Maltings.

Snape Maltings Concert Hall is an 830-seat international concert hall, converted from a redundant Victorian malthouse in 1967. The Concert Hall incorporates a Restaurant and the Oyster Bar, and displays exhibitions in the Concert Hall Gallery. A Visitor Centre off the main foyer houses the Box Office, an information point and a shop.

The Hoffmann Building, converted from semi-derelict malting and storage buildings adjacent to the Concert Hall, was opened in 2009 and houses the Britten Studio (340 capacity), the Jerwood Kiln Studio (80 capacity), the Foyle and the Weinrebe Studios, as well as office and circulation space.

The Britten-Pears Building was converted from an old barley store in 1979 to create the Britten–Pears School for Advanced Musical Studies, now renamed the Britten Pears Young Artist Programme. The building contains the Peter Pears Recital Room (120 capacity) and a number of practice and seminar rooms, and the Holst Library. Adjacent is the Trask Artists' Cafe.

The Pond Gallery is a small art gallery, let to local artists, and adjacent is a long room currently known as Building 19, awaiting further development.

In Aldeburgh itself, events take place during the Festival at the Jubilee Hall, the Aldeburgh Parish Church, and the Pumphouse. Performances also take place at other venues around Suffolk including the churches of Orford and Blythburgh. Site-specific events have been held in a number of locations, including Aldeburgh and Sizewell beaches, Bentwaters Airbase, and Leiston Long Shop Museum.
