= Itay =

Itay (Hebrew: איתי) is a given name. Notable people with the name include:

- Itay Levi (born 1988), Israeli musician
- Itay Margalit (born 1970), retired Israeli high jumper
- Itay Segev (born 1995), Israeli basketball player
- Itay Shechter (born 1987), Israeli footballer
- Itay Talgam (born 1958), Israeli conductor and business consultant
- Itay Tiran (born 1980), Israeli stage and screen actor

== See also ==
- Itai
