= Operation Rooster 53 =

1969 Israeli military operation during the War of Attrition

- Part of the War of Attrition
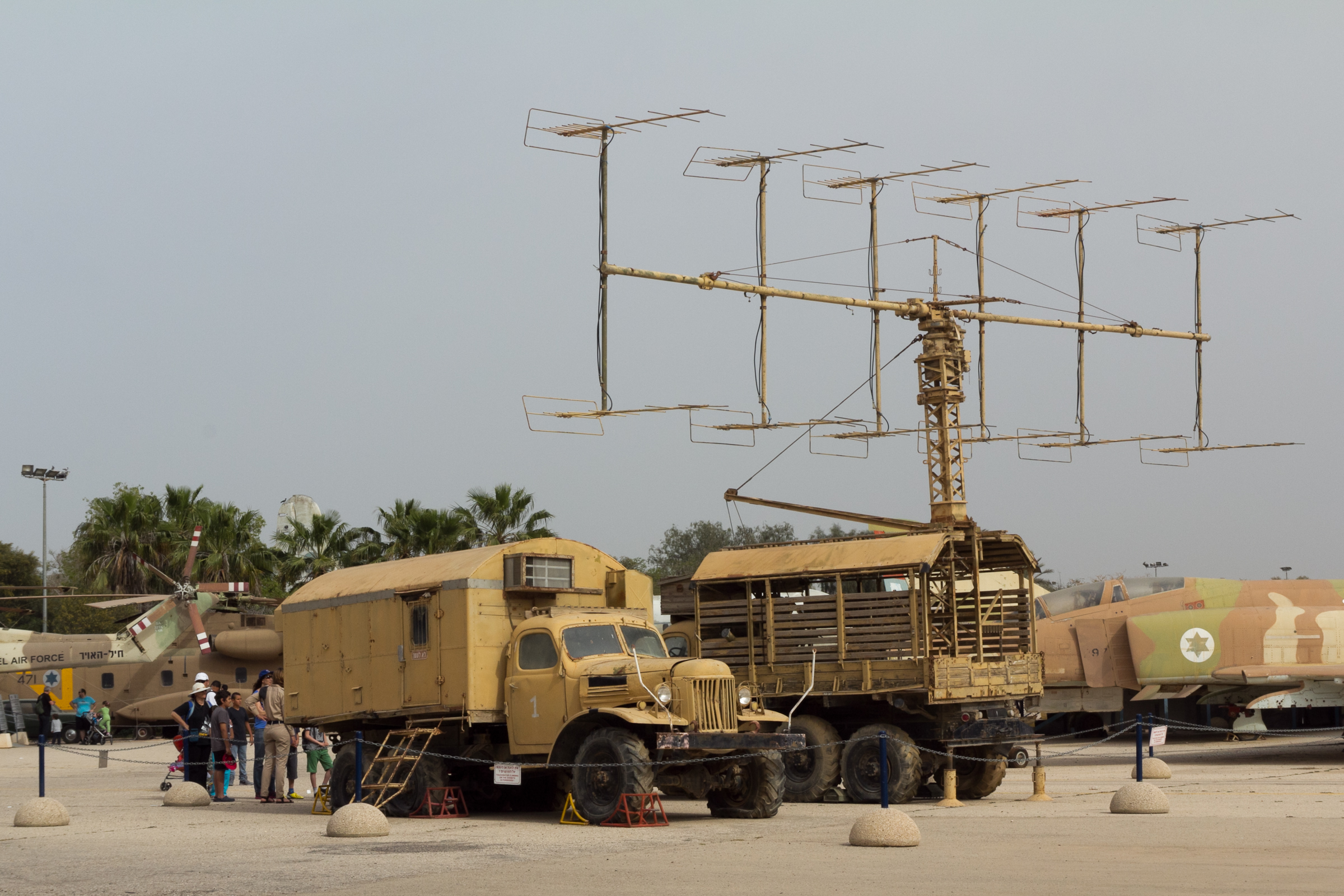
- Former Egyptian P-12 radar at the Israeli Air Force Museum in Hatzerim
Date	26–27 December 1969
Location	Ras Ghareb, Egypt
Result	Israeli victory

Belligerents
Israel	Egypt

Commanders and leaders
Haim Bar Lev	Saad El Shazly

Casualties and losses
1 wounded	2 killed 4 captured

Operation Rooster 53 was an Israeli military operation during the War of Attrition to capture an Egyptian P-12 radar system. Often referred to as simply Operation Rooster, it was carried out on 26 and 27 December 1969. Participating forces included the 50th Battalion of the Paratroopers Brigade, the elite paratrooper reconnaissance unit Sayeret Tzanhanim, and the Israeli Air Force.

== Background ==
The War of Attrition raged along the Suez Canal, as Egypt attempted to recapture the Sinai Peninsula, which Israel had conquered during the 1967 Six-Day War. Egypt had received a considerable amount of military equipment from the Soviet Union, including radar systems, tanks, and other weapons. During the Six-Day War, Israel had captured some of this equipment, giving it important intelligence on the weaknesses of the Egyptian air defense.

Reconnaissance missions showed that a P-12 radar system had been placed on the beach at Ras Gharib, on the western shore of the Red Sea. An initial plan to destroy it by airstrike was cancelled. Instead, Israeli forces, who were keen to understand the new system, planned an operation to capture it.

== Planning ==
Planning of the mission started on 24 December. It received approval from the IDF chain of command and training began on radar systems which had been captured during the Six-Day War. Sikorsky CH-53 Sea Stallion helicopters were chosen to carry the radar to Israeli territory.

== Execution of the mission ==
The mission was launched at 9 p.m. on 26 December. A-4 Skyhawks and F-4 Phantoms began attacking Egyptian forces along the western bank of the Suez canal and Red Sea. Hidden by the noise of the attacking jets, three SA 321 Super Frelons, carrying a force from the 35th Paratroopers Brigade, led by Lieutenant colonel Arie Sidon and his deputy Doron Rubin, made their way west towards their target. Making their approach carefully in order not to be spotted beforehand, the paratroopers overwhelmed the light security contingent at the radar installation and quickly took control of the site.

By 2 a.m., on 27 December, when the paratroops had taken apart the radar station and prepared the various parts for the CH-53s, the two helicopters were called in from across the Red Sea. One CH-53 carried the communications caravan and the radar antenna, while the other took the heavier, four-ton radar itself. The two helicopters made their way back across the Red Sea to Israeli controlled Sinai. The heavier load exceeded the CH-53's capacity, damaging it and forcing an emergency landing short of its destination; a second CH-53 was needed to relay the radar back to the rendezvous location.
