= Jonathan Reekie =

Director of Somerset House Trust (born 1964)

Jonathan Reekie CBE
- Born: Jonathan Alistair James Reekie; 2 September 1964 (age 61); London, England
- Occupation: Arts administrator
- Employer: Somerset House Trust

Jonathan Alistair James Reekie CBE (born 2 September 1964, in London) is a British arts administrator who has more than 30 years leadership experience across festivals, the arts and creative industries.

Since 2014, Reekie has been the Director of Somerset House Trust. Under his tenure, the renovation of the historic site has been completed, including the launch of Somerset House Studios, helping to establish Somerset House as "London's Working Arts Centre", home to a creative community in central London. Reekie has overseen the expansion of the cultural programme, including PJ Harvey's Recording in Progress with Artangel, Björk Digital, Big Bang Data, Perfume, and Get Up, Stand Up Now. In 2019, Reekie co-curated with Sarah Cook the exhibition 24/7, "a wake-up call to a non-stop world", based on the book by Jonathan Crary.

== Career ==
Reekie's first job, when still a student, was working for the opera festival Musica nel Chiostro, Batignano, Italy. On finishing his degree, he spent five seasons at Glyndebourne Opera.

In 1991, he joined the Almeida Theatre as General Manager, to work alongside the two artistic directors, Jonathan Kent and Ian McDiarmid, and helped produce more than 30 theatre productions. While at the Almeida, Reekie founded a contemporary opera festival, Almeida Opera, as a successor to the Almeida Festival, commissioning and producing more than 20 contemporary operas and concert series, including Thomas Adès's Powder Her Face, Jonathan Dove, Giorgio Battistelli and UK premieres by Heiner Goebbels, Olga Neuwirth, Per Nørgård.

Reekie became Chief Executive of Aldeburgh Music in 1997, though he continued to collaborate with Almeida Opera for a further five years. He stayed at Aldeburgh for 16 years, collaborating with Festival Artistic Directors Thomas Adès, from 1999 to 2008, and Pierre-Laurent Aimard from 2009. Reekie was the architect of Aldeburgh's year-long Benjamin Britten Centenary programme in 2013, featuring most notably Peter Grimes on Aldeburgh beach (described in The Guardian as "a remarkable, and surely unrepeatable achievement"), and The Borough, created by Punchdrunk theatre company. At Aldeburgh, Reekie produced more than 20 new operas and music theatre works, many commissioned, including from composers Richard Ayres, Harrison Birtwistle, Oliver Knussen and Anna Meredith. Repertoire opera productions included The Rape of Lucretia, directed by David McVicar; The Rake's Progress, director Neil Bartlett; and Death in Venice, director Yoshi Oida. Other projects in Aldeburgh included SNAP – Art at the Aldeburgh Festival, with Abigail Lane, Ryan Gander, Maggi Hambling, Sarah Lucas, Glenn Brown and many others artists associated with Suffolk, and Faster than Sound, an experimental music programme including commissions from Mira Calix, Christian Marclay and Chris Watson, among numerous others. Reekie's tenure also saw considerable expansion of the artist development and education programme and major capital projects, with the creation of the Pumphouse in 2000, and in 2009, the new Hoffmann Building at Snape Maltings, including the 350-seat Britten Studio.

After 16 years as chief executive at Aldeburgh Music, Reekie took up the post of director of Somerset House Trust in 2014, and has been acknowledged for successfully transforming the Somerset House building from a "museum" attraction into a viable popular centre for contemporary art and the creative industries.

== Other roles ==
Reekie has been a trustee of Musica nel Chiostro, the Arts Foundation, and an adviser to the Paul Hamlyn Foundation.

== Awards ==
In 2010, Reekie was made an Honorary Fellow of the Royal Academy of Music, London, and received an Honorary Doctorate of Music from the University of East Anglia.

Reekie was appointed Commander of the British Empire (CBE) in the 2013 Birthday Honours, for services to music.
