= Raful =

Raful is a surname. Notable people with the surname include:

- Faride Raful (born 1979), Dominican lawyer, politician, and radio and TV presenter
- Tony Raful (born 1951), Dominican poet

== See also ==
- Rafael Eitan (1929–2004), Israeli general
