= Inter-Services Command and Staff College (Israel) =

Israeli military training institution

- המכללה הבין-זרועית לפיקוד ולמטה
- Command and Staff College logo
- Active: 1954–present
- Country: Israel
- Allegiance: Israel Defense Forces

Commanders
- Current commander: Tat Aluf Avi Bluth

Insignia
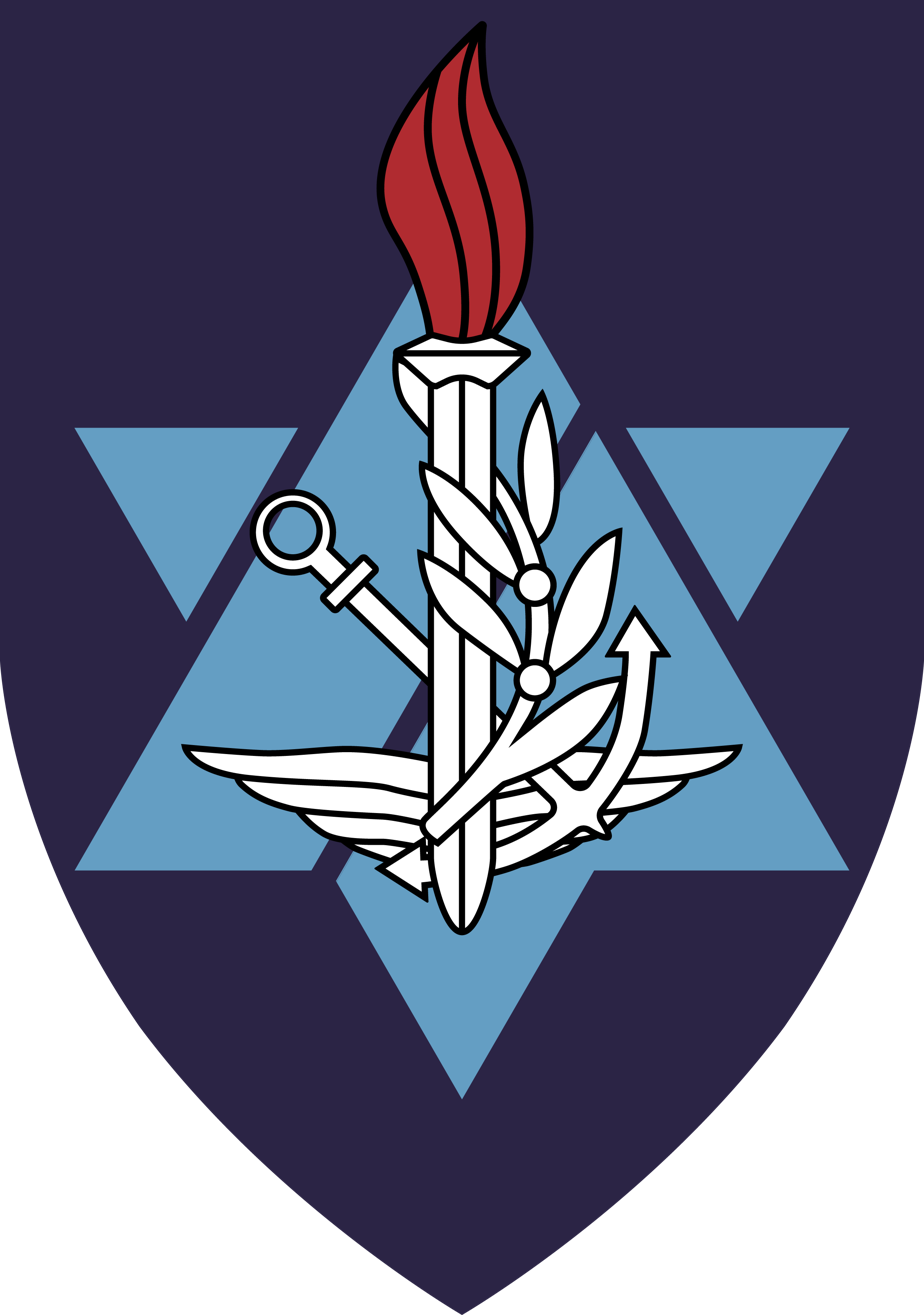
- Shoulder tag

The Inter-Services Command and Staff College (Hebrew: המכללה הבין-זרועית לפיקוד ולמטה) is a staff college, intended for training of senior officers of Israel Defense Forces (IDF). It was established on May 31, 1954.

In the mid-1980s the collected statistics showed that a significant number of senior officers paid little attention to this kind of study. This, together with the drawbacks in military training revealed during the 1982 Lebanon War, had led to a series of reorganizations, continued well into 2010s.

In 1991, all military colleges, including PUM, were merged into the IDF Military Colleges unit under the General Staff.

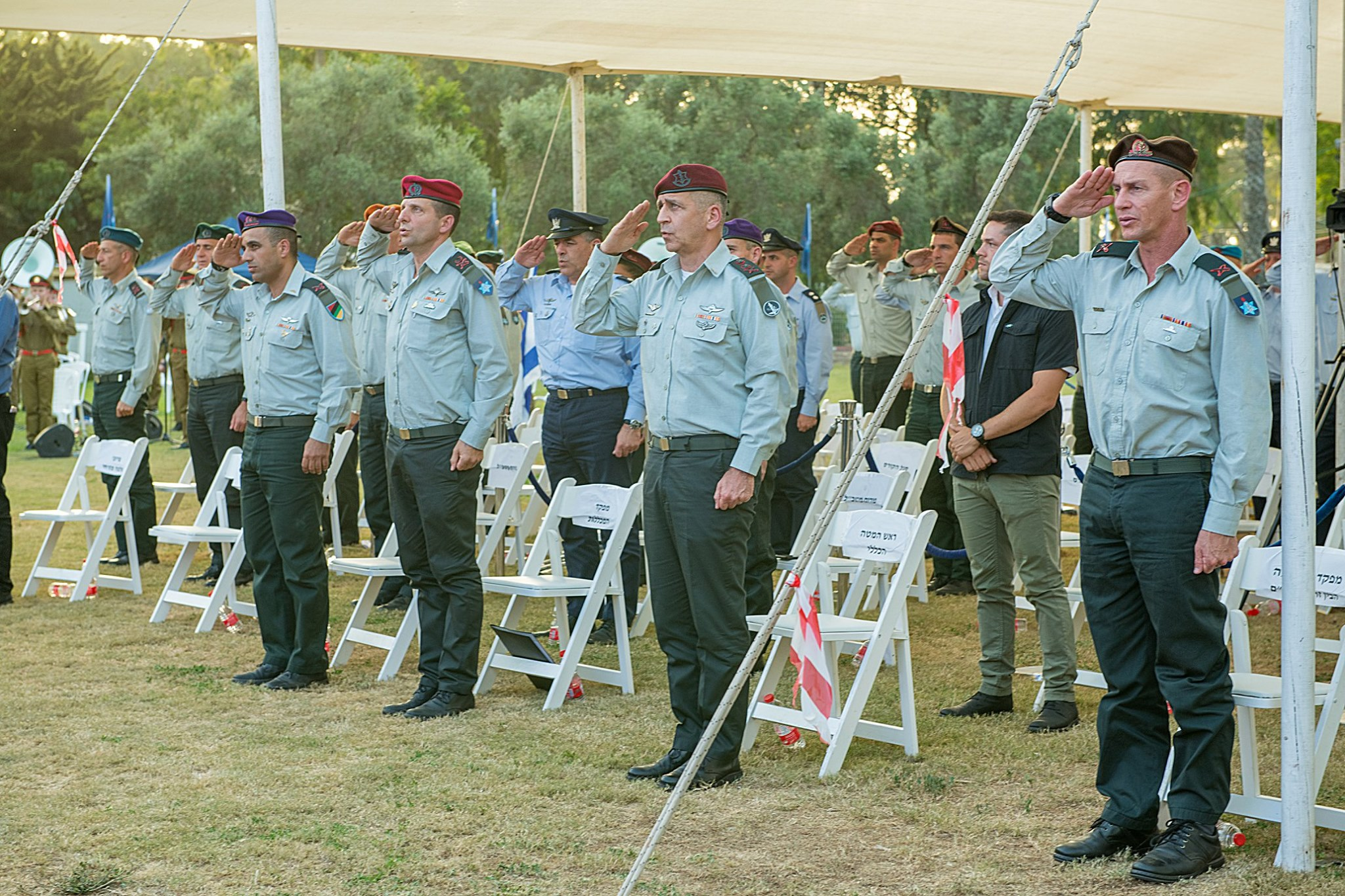
PUM graduation ceremony (2020)

In 2004, it was decided to add a course for Air Force.

Eventually the two courses were merged into a single "Afek course" (named after Sharon Afek) intended for commanders and staff officers ranked Lieutenant Colonel and above from all military arms.

In 2018, the University of Haifa had won the first-ever educational tender from the IDF for all military colleges, including PUM.

== Commanders ==
- 1954–1956: Aharon Yariv, member of the founding team and the first commander
- 1969–1972: Moshe Peled
- 2001–2004: Jacob Zigdon, tat-aluf (Brigadier general)
- 2004–2006: Amos Ben-Abraham
- 2006–2009: Avi Ashkenazi
- 2009–2011: Noam Tivon
- 2011–2014: Harel Knafo
- 2014: Herzi Halevi
- 2014–2015: Roni Numa
- 2015–2016: Ofek Buharis, tat-aluf
- 2016–2019: Udi Ben-Mocha, rav-aluf (Lieutenant general)
- 2019–2022: Rafi Milo, tat-aluf
- 2022–2023: Yaniv Alalof, tat-aluf
- 2023–present: Avi Bluth, tat-aluf

== See also ==
- National Security College (Israel)
