= Jo'ara =

Depopulated village and military site in the Menashe Heights of Northern Israel

Jo'ara (Arabic: جعارة), also spelled Ja'ara or Ju'ara, is a former military installation in the Menashe Heights. A small Palestinian Arab village existed on the hill until the 1930s. Between 1938 and 1948, it became the main military school for commanding officers of the Haganah and Palmach. After the establishment of Israel, the hill was used as a military base and officers school, and between 1970 and 2016 by the Youth Battalions' (Gad'na) pre-military programme. The base and its museum were closed down in 2016–2017.

== Historical settlement ==
Jo'ara جعارة Ja'ara, Ju'ara
- Village
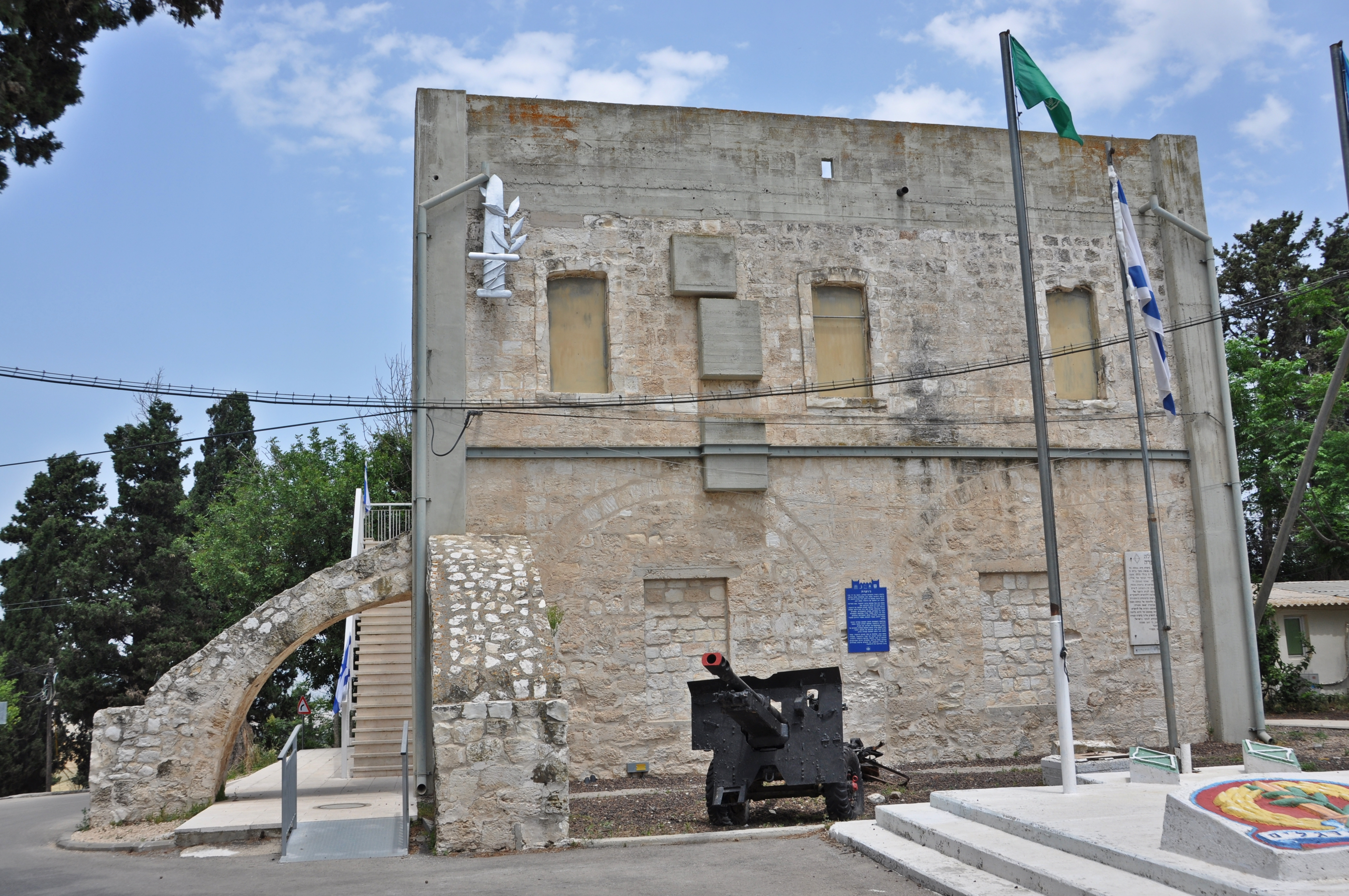
- Building in Jo'ara
- Etymology: "Hyena"Palmer, 1881, p. 146.
- Location within Mandatory Palestine
- Coordinates: 32°36′00″N 35°06′31″E
- Palestine grid: 160/222
- Geopolitical entity: Mandatory Palestine
- Subdistrict: Haifa

Population (1931)
  - Total: 62Mills 1,932 p. 92.

=== Byzantine period ===
A grave has been excavated here, yielding coins from Arcadius (395–408) and Theodosius II (408–450).

=== Ottoman period ===
During the Ottoman era, a Muslim village called Jarah (lit. "hyena") existed in the area. In 1596 the village appeared under the name of Ja'ara in tax registers, being part of the nahiya (subdistrict) of Sahil Atlit in the Sanjak (district) of Lajjun. It had a population of 4 households, all Muslim. They paid a fixed tax-rate of 25% on agricultural products, including wheat, barley, summer crops, goats and beehives, in addition to occasional revenues; the taxes totalled 2,000 akçe.

During the 19th and first half of the 20th century, Ja'ara was one of the settlements of the so-called "Fahmawi Commonwealth" established by Hebronite clans belonging to Umm al-Fahm. The Commonwealth consisted of a network of interspersed communities connected by ties of kinship, and socially, economically and politically affiliated with Umm al Fahm. The Commonwealth dominated vast sections of Bilad al-Ruha/Ramot Menashe, Wadi 'Ara and Marj Ibn 'Amir/Jezreel Valley during that time.

In 1882, the Palestine Exploration Fund's Survey of Western Palestine described Jarah as "a small village on the east side of the watershed, with four springs below it. There are rock-cut tombs, so that the place seems to be an ancient site." They further noted that the tombs were blocked up. A population list from about 1887 showed that J'arah had about 135 inhabitants, all Muslim.

=== British Mandate ===
In the 1922 census of Palestine conducted by the British Mandate authorities, Jaara had a population of 94, all Muslims, decreasing in the 1931 census to 62, still all Muslims, in a total of 14 houses.

In the 1930s, the Jewish National Fund bought the hill and the lands around it from the Salah family, who lived in Haifa and owned the agricultural village. In 1937 Jewish kibbutz members settled the hill, but left a year later, because the area wasn't big enough, to a nearby area and established kibbutz Ein HaShofet.

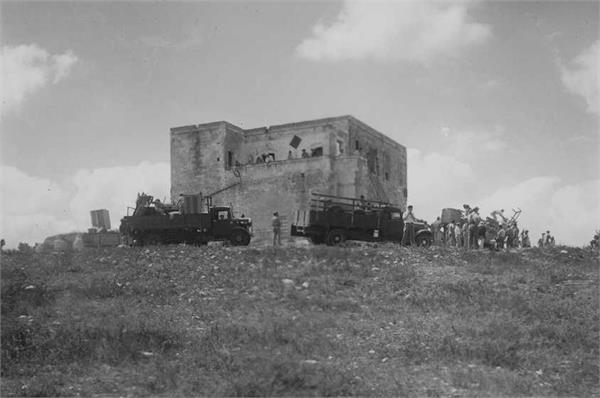
Jo’ara 1937

== Haganah and Israel Defense Forces base ==
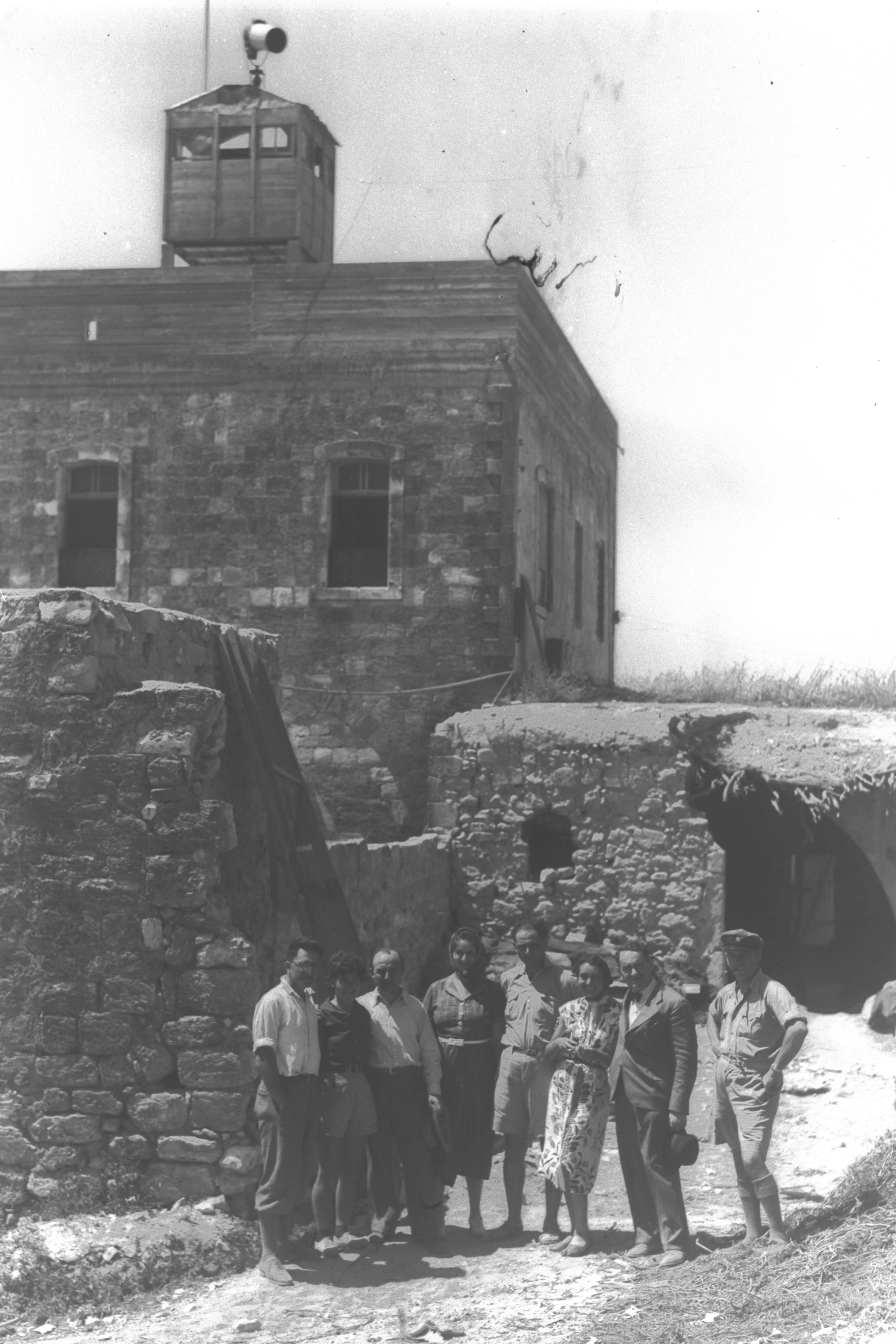
Jo’ara 1938

From 1938 onwards the hill, which was turned into a base, was used for the Haganah and Palmach commanders and instructors school. Haganah organization set up a training base and main training for the Haganah, in which Some of the commanders and instructors trained here would count among the best future IDF officers, several becoming generals and chiefs of staff, such as Yaakov Dori, Yigael Yadin, Moshe Dayan, Haim Laskov, Tzvi Tzur, Yitzhak Rabin and Haim Bar-Lev.

=== 1948 war ===
During the 1948 war, the hill was used as the Haganah's base for attacks in the Battle of Mishmar HaEmek.

=== Training base and officers school (1948-67) ===
After the war it was used as a training base for the Nahal program that combined military service and the establishment of agricultural settlements.

Between 1950 and 1967 it was used as the Golani Brigade's school for squad commanders.

=== Youth battalions (Gadna) base (1970-2016) ===
For 45 years, between 1970 and 2016, the hill served the Israel Defense Forces' Youth Battalion's one-week familiarisation programme intended on preparing Israeli youth for their military service. High school students from all over Israel used to come to Jo'ara for a week of military training. The week included field craft and weapon training as well as historical and moral courses, all in boot camp conditions and discipline. The teenagers experienced a routine military life, wearing military uniform and obeying orders from their commanders.

Jo'ara was chosen as a Gadna base because the open fields, forests and the hills that surround it are suitable for military training. The base was inaugurated on 9 October 1970 in presence of high ranked IDF generals. In 1991, when the Gadna Command was dismantled and moved to the Education and Youth Corps, the base moved to the command of the Chief Education Officer.

The museum at Jo'ara was presenting the Hagana's officer training courses of 1944, when it reached a record 140 trainees, both men and women.

== Bibliography ==
- Barron, J.B., ed. (1923). Palestine: Report and General Abstracts of the Census of 1922. Government of Palestine.
- Conder, C.R.; Kitchener, H.H. (1882). The Survey of Western Palestine: Memoirs of the Topography, Orography, Hydrography, and Archaeology. Vol. 2. London: Committee of the Palestine Exploration Fund.
- Dauphin, C. (1998). La Palestine byzantine, Peuplement et Populations. BAR International Series 726 (in French). Vol. III : Catalogue. Oxford: Archeopress. ISBN 0-860549-05-4.
- Department of Statistics (1945). Village Statistics, April, 1945. Government of Palestine.
- Hadawi, S. (1970). Village Statistics of 1945: A Classification of Land and Area ownership in Palestine. Palestine Liberation Organization Research Center.
- Hütteroth, W.-D.; Abdulfattah, K. (1977). Historical Geography of Palestine, Transjordan and Southern Syria in the Late 16th Century. Erlanger Geographische Arbeiten, Sonderband 5. Erlangen, Germany: Vorstand der Fränkischen Geographischen Gesellschaft. ISBN 3-920405-41-2.
- Mills, E., ed. (1932). Census of Palestine 1931. Population of Villages, Towns and Administrative Areas. Jerusalem: Government of Palestine.
- Palmer, E.H. (1881). The Survey of Western Palestine: Arabic and English Name Lists Collected During the Survey by Lieutenants Conder and Kitchener, R. E. Transliterated and Explained by E.H. Palmer. Committee of the Palestine Exploration Fund.
- Schumacher, G. (1888). "Population list of the Liwa of Akka". Quarterly Statement - Palestine Exploration Fund. 20: 169–191.
