= Itay Talgam =

Israeli conductor (born 1958)

- איתי טלגם
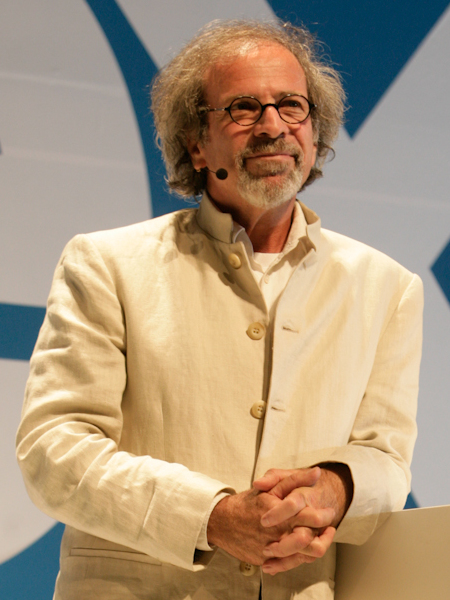
- Born: 24 March 1958 (age 68)
- Occupations: Conductor, Business consultant

Itay Talgam (Hebrew: איתי טלגם; born 24 March 1958, Tel Aviv) is an Israeli conductor and business consultant.

== Biography ==
Itay Talgam studied at the Rubin Academy and received a degree in philosophy from the Hebrew University of Jerusalem. He started out as a pianist, but switched to conducting after his military service in the Israel Defense Forces. He attended a summer course given by Leonard Bernstein in Fontainebleau, France. His son Imri Talgam is a pianist and composer.

== Music career ==
Talgam debuted as an international conductor in 1987, when he was chosen by Leonard Bernstein to appear in a special concert with Orchestre de Paris. Bernstein conducted the second half of the concert. Since then, he has conducted many orchestras in Europe. He was the first Israeli conductor to perform with the St. Petersburg Philharmonic Orchestra and the Leipzig Opera. In Israel, he has conducted and recorded with Israel Philharmonic Orchestra, New Israeli Opera, Jerusalem Symphony Orchestra, Israel Symphony Orchestra Rishon LeZion, Haifa Symphony Orchestra and Israel Chamber Orchestra. He has worked with most of the major orchestras in Israel. Itay Talgam gives seminars and workshops on the operations of the symphony orchestra, which he sees as a metaphor for organizational behavior and a model for inspired leadership.

== Awards and recognition ==
As Music Director of the Tel Aviv Symphony Orchestra and of Ensemble Musica Nova Talgam won the prize for “Best performance of the year” for Israeli orchestral music, awarded by the National Council for the Arts.

== See also ==
- Music of Israel
