= Depth Corps =

Command of the Israel Defense Forces

- מפקדת העומק
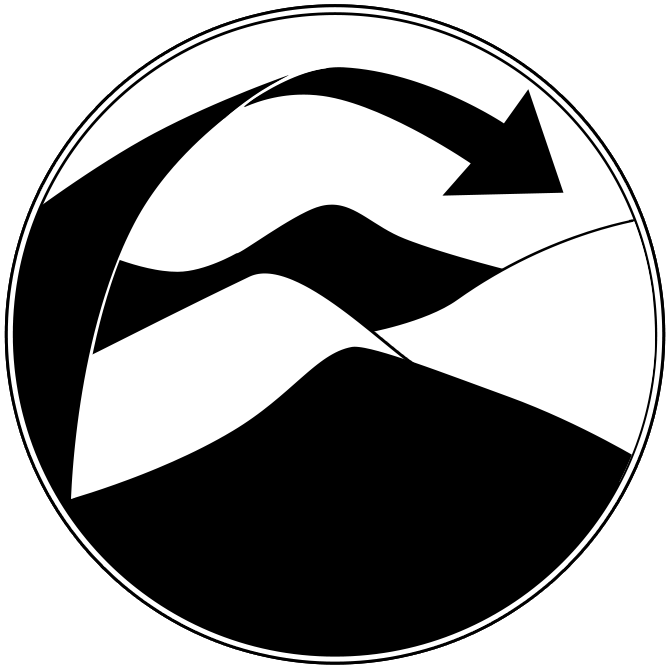
- Active: 2011–present
- Country: Israel
- Allegiance: Israel Defense Forces

Commanders
- Current commander: Maj. Gen. Dan Goldfuss

The Depth Corps (Hebrew: מפקדת העומק, lit. 'Depth Headquarters') of the Israel Defense Forces (IDF) is a command formed in 2011 to coordinate the IDF's long range operations and operations deep in enemy territory.

The command originally formed in the 1980s but was scaled down and then planned again in the 2000s. The decision for its formation in the current form was taken by Chief of Staff Benny Gantz in 2011. Its current commander is Major General Dan Goldfuss.

== History ==
The command originally operated in 1982–1986. It was subordinated to the Southern Command and headed by Major General Doron Rubin. It was scaled down and commanded by a brigadier general until 2011. The last commander of the unit in this form was Gil Tamir.

=== Operations ===
The Depth Corps was recreated as a major command out of a feeling that Israel's special forces were underutilized in the nation's conflicts, and out of a lack of a body coordinating their operations behind enemy lines. This was made possible by preparations made by the major generals Shay Avital, Aviv Kokhavi, Ido Nehoshtan and Gadi Eizenkot. According to Israeli newspaper Haaretz, it was also a means for Defense Minister Ehud Barak to realize his vision of having more special forces veterans in the IDF's General Staff.

Previously, many of IDF's special operations were commanded by the naval or air force chiefs by virtue of the soldiers being transported by sea or air, respectively, regardless of the essence of these operations.

One of the primary missions for the new corps will be the special forces operations to prevent transfer of advanced weaponry of supplies to groups like Hamas and Hezbollah. This may include new naval units and possibly a squadron of Bell Boeing V-22 Osprey aircraft.
