= IDF Military Colleges =

Training colleges of the Israel Defense Forces

The IDF Military Colleges are a number of training institutions for the officers of the Israel Defense Forces. It is located at Camp Dayan in Glilot, Tel Aviv. The institution is under the command of the General Staff. Its current commander is Major General Dan Neumann.

It was established in 1991 by merging the Israeli military colleges into a single unit. Its first commander was Major General Yossi Ben Hanan.

== Formation ==
Currently the IDF Military Colleges include:

- National Security College
- Inter-Services Command and Staff College
- Tactical Command College

== Location ==
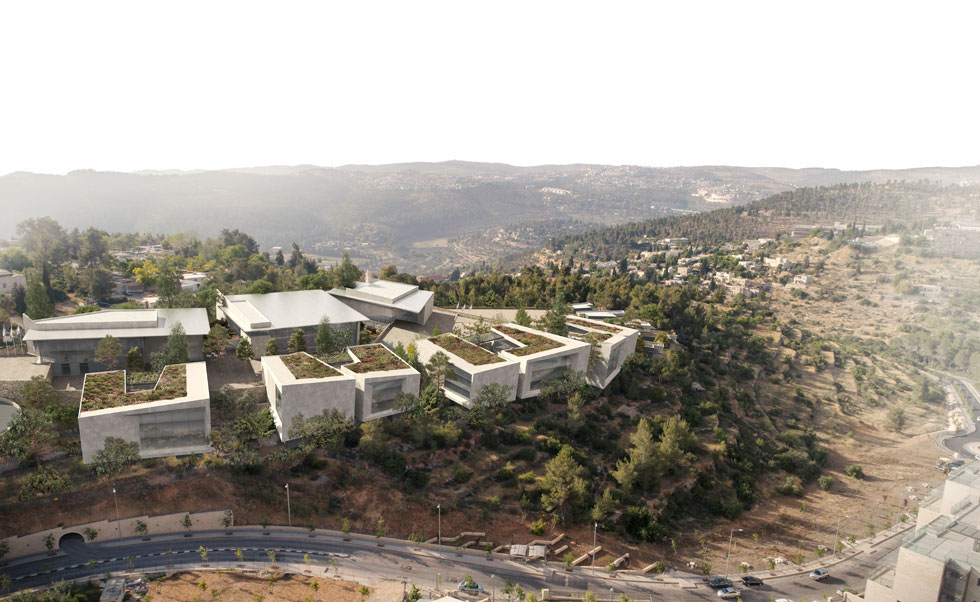
Planned view of the Military Colleges on the Terrace Hill by Ein Kerem

It is located at Dayan Camp, Glilot Camps near Ramat Hasharon.

In 2010 a decision was approved to evacuate most of the Glilot camp complex, with the expensive land repurposed as residential area. Between 2002 and 2019, there were various suggestions for the future location of the Military Colleges camp by Jerusalem, but no agreement between the IDF and civil organizations was reached. In August 2019, despite appeals, a location was chosen: 39 dunam (9.75 acres) in area within the government-owned public land in the Jerusalem Forest at the Terrace Hill near the Ein Kerem neighborhood of Jerusalem and the Israel Elwyn Center (the latter location is still referred by its former name "Swedish Village" Hebrew: כפר השוודי, romanized: Kfar HaShvedi).
