= National Security College (Israel) =

Military education institution in Israel

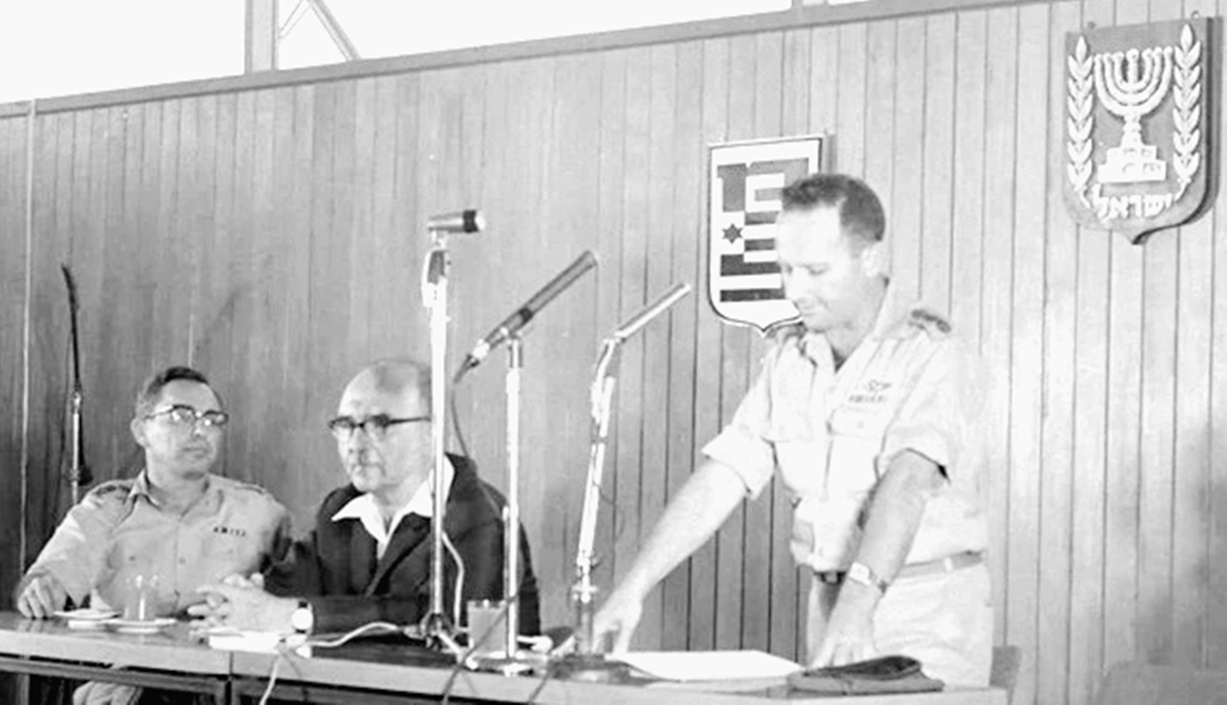
MABAL opening ceremony, 1963

The National Security College (Hebrew: המכללה לביטחון לאומי, romanized: haMichlala l'Bitachon Leumi, abbreviated as MBL), also known as the National Defense College, is a military education institution in Israel, intended to provide education on national security at an academic level. The college is intended for senior members of the all branches of the Israeli security forces.

The decision to establish the college was made by the cabinet in 1962 and it was opened in October 1963 with Colonel Uzi Narkiss as its head but in 1966 a committee was established to analyze whether the existence of the college is justified in view of the difficult economic situation. It was decided that the college failed to efficiently address the stated goals and it was decided to close it in 1967. It was decided to reopen it in 1977.

In 1991 all military colleges, including MABAL, were merged into IDF Military Colleges under the General Staff.

In 2006 the college started to accept student from foreign militaries.

== See also ==
- Institute for National Security Studies (Israel)
