= Prison Six =

Israeli military prison

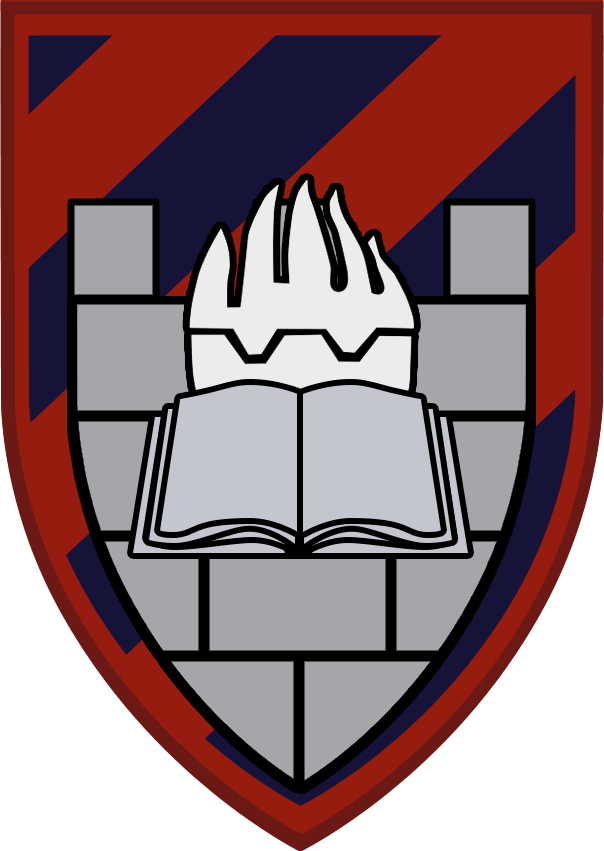
- Logo of the facility

- Location within Israel
- Location: Atlit, Haifa District, Israel; 32°42′49″N 34°58′06″E
- Opened: 1956
- Closed: 2021
- Managed by: Israel Prison Service

Notable prisoners
- 350

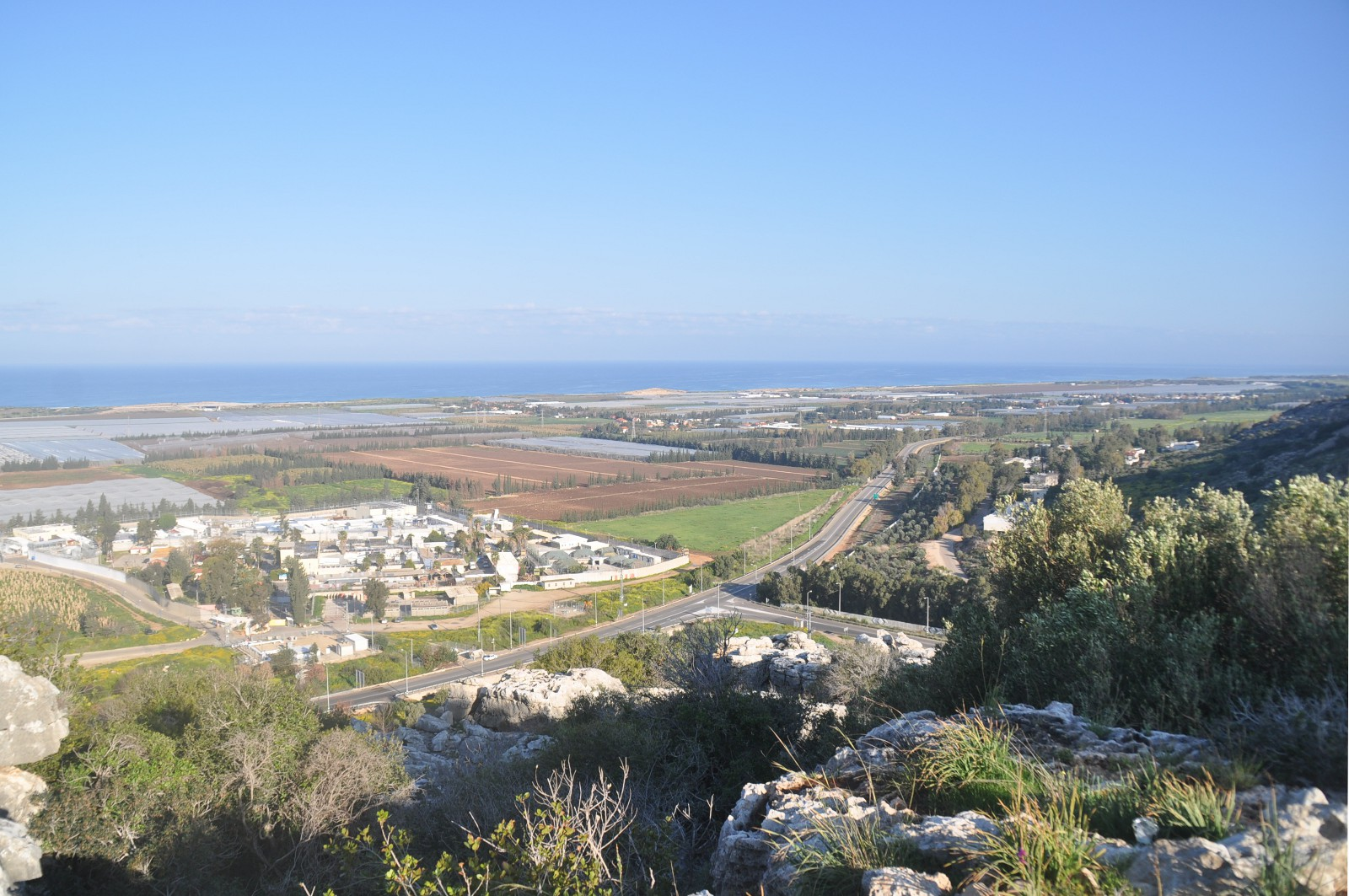
View of Prison Six

Prison Six (Hebrew: כלא שש Kele Shesh), officially Confinement Base 396 (Hebrew: בסיס כליאה 396 Bsis Kli'a 396) is an Israeli military prison located near Atlit, Israel, on Oren Junction.

It was the second military prison for IDF soldiers, after Prison Four in Tzrifin (Camp Yadin). Prison Six can contain about 350 prisoners. Prison Six generally contained prisoners from the Northern Command, as well as officers and senior NCOs.

Both prisons were closed in 2021 and the prisoners were transferred to the new Neve Tzedek military prison within the Gur Camp complex near Kfar Yona.

== History ==
Prison Six was conceptualized by an officer named Yaakov Markovich, after an analysis of Prison Four's deteriorating conditions (which would improve if the overcapacity was alleviated). Chief Military Police Officer Yosef Pressman pushed for its construction and it was finally built following the 1956 Sinai War.

=== 1969 flood ===
On November 22, 1969 at about 21:00, Prison Six was flooded due to a powerful rainstorm, and the water level rose to a level of 2 m. The prison's security was compromised when the powerful water current destroyed the front gate and created holes in the outer walls. An attempt was made to open the cells, although due to the flow, this was impossible in many cases. Instead, some of the freed prisoners were given tools to scale the cellblocks and destroy their roofs, so that trapped prisoners could be rescued from above. The prisoners of the three last cells, which were impossible to reach, were able to also receive tools, and destroyed the cell walls from within. The electricity was disconnected in fear of electrocution, and the rest of the work was done in the darkness.

None of the prisoners used the flood as a means to escape, and instead helped in the effort to minimize the damage and prevent injury. As a result, the commander of the Manpower Directorate, which is responsible for the Military Police Corps including its prisons, decided to release dozens of prisoners and cancel their sentences. Six soldiers were decorated for their actions during their flood, three of them MPs.

=== Rebellion ===
On Saturday, August 9, 1997, Prison Six suffered a prison riot in Company Gimel, caused by what the rebels claimed the deplorable conditions, where several prisoners led by Gideon Martin, a Russian immigrant (born in Sierra Leone) took control of the company's dining room and captured several jail instructors and sergeants. After negotiations, an agreement was reached between the prisoners and the chief military police officer (kamtzar) to release the hostages in exchange for better conditions for the prisoners. The agreement was immediately revoked and the leaders of the revolt received greater sentences.

The rebellion completely changed the military police's approach to its prison service sector and changes were made in the physical structures of the military prisons, as well as in conditions for both jail instructors and prisoners. Intelligence gatherers also gained prestige and more were recruited.

Following the rebellion, the Ashhal Commission was formed to investigate the incident, and the Dekel Commission was appointed by the General Staff to recommend a policy for the prison section in the IDF.

The rebellion was the base of the 2009 Israeli film The Loners.

== In popular culture ==
- HaGashash HaHiver released a skit about Prison Six, where they sang the popular song Uzi Uzi.
- An Israeli rap band active since 1998 was named Kele Shesh (Hebrew for Prison Six).
- Several Israeli songs mention Prison Six, notably the Mizrahi music single BaKele HaTzva'i (In the Military Prison) by Nuriel, where the protagonist of the song serves a 28-day sentence in Prison Six.
- The 2009 Israeli film HaBodedim by director Renen Schorr is based on the Prison Six rebellion.
