= Force 100 (Israel) =

- כוח 100
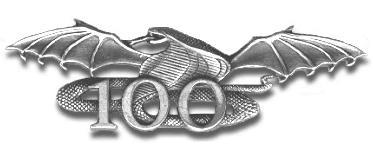
- Force 100 warrior pin
- Active: 1990s - 2006; 2023 - present
- Country: Israel
- Type: Takeover unit; Special forces
- Part of: Israeli Military Police Corps

Force 100 (Hebrew: כוח 100) is a counterterrorism unit within the Israel Defense Forces (IDF). Its primary mission is to manage and control extreme situations in military prisons where terrorists are detained. The unit's name is derived from the word "force," symbolizing a combat team, and the number 100, which is associated with the police, reflecting the unit's professional subordination to the Israeli Military Police Corps.

== Background ==
Initially, Force 100 was subordinate to the command of the prison facility where it was stationed while remaining professionally under the jurisdiction of the Military Police Corps. Soldiers of the unit wore a combat pin and a blue beret. The unit was established in the mid-1990s and disbanded in 2006.

Following the 2023 Hamas-led attack on Israel, Force 100 was reactivated under the Israeli Southern Command. It now serves as a special takeover unit within the IDF's special forces, with its primary mission remaining the same. They are currently attached to the Duvdevan counterterrorism unit and are elite reservists that have gone through the rigorous special forces courses of the IDF and are on high alert 24/7. In the first three months of the war against the Hamas terror group, that began on October 7, 2023, ten Duvdevan operators have been killed in combat including 3 from Force 100. Unit members cannot show their faces to the media or wear any insignia in public.

== Criticism ==
Members of the Force 100 unit and the Israeli Military Police Corps unit were arrested in connection with an alleged gang-rape in the sde teiman detention camp.
