= Israeli military prisons =

Israeli military prisons are facilities operated by the Israel Defense Forces that primarily detain soldiers convicted of offenses under military law.

== Prison sector history ==
The need to create military prisons in the Israel Defense Forces (IDF) arose as the soldiers' discipline deteriorated over the course of the 1948 Arab–Israeli War. At first, detention centers were built in the infantry brigades' bases under the auspices of the Manpower Directorate.

The prison sector of the Israeli Military Police was founded in June 1948. It was originally called Military Police Prisons (Hebrew: משטרה צבאית בתי הסוהר), under a Prisons Officer. The sector was slated to include military prisons under the command of the military police, as well as brigade detention centers, for light prisoners, subordinate to the respective brigades. The first Israeli military prison was built on the ruins of al-Shaykh Muwannis (now North Tel Aviv), under Captain Yoel Caspi. Immediately smaller prisons were erected in Acre, Jaffa and Jerusalem.

The facilities were deemed temporary, and two months later Prison Four was founded in Tzrifin. A prison for female soldiers was conceptualized in March 1949 and founded near Nahalal in 1952 as Prison 400, under Lieutenant Elihava Gerchuk. The year 1952 also saw the approval of another military prison (Prison Six), due to the deteriorating conditions of Prison Four. Prison Six was conceptualized and originally commanded by Major Yaakov Markovitz, after he was taken under the wing of then-chief military police officer, Yosef Pressman. A jailor course was also founded to teach jailors to deal with prisoners.

In 1955, detailed regulations for the prison sector were published, which introduced a new set of orders and ideals for the sector. The main objective of the system was changed from the British idea of seeking to dissuade prisoners from returning, to a new idea of rehabilitation. The orders defined the permissible chores for prisoners, maximum work hours, punishments and basic conditions. In 1976, the new chief military police officer, Benjamin Inbar, took the rehabilitation to a new level by formulating a set of orders which clarified that the military prisons were meant to serve the IDF as a whole, not just the courts and commanders that handed down sentences. Inbar strove to improve relations between prisoners and jailors, and introduced new activities in the prisons. More attention was paid to where each prisoner would be put, and various prisoner types were clearly defined. As part of this trend, Prison Seven was built in April 1980 in the Ktzi'ot base to hold light prisoners with no criminal record.

As the need arose to guard prisoners of war (POW), POW camps were built in the Prison Six area and Nitzanim. A minor additional camp was built in Damun Prison for high-ranking enemy officers. Today, the Atlit camp is reserved for high-ranking enemy officers.

Over the years, prisoners saw many improvements in their living and social conditions in military prison. Chief Military Police Officer Raphael Vardi brought education to military prisons in 1960, as well as social workers (as of 2007, all military prisons have a staff of psychologists, teachers, and other social workers). In 1994, Nir-Am Goldbroom, soon to be chief MP officer, opened the doors of Prisons Four and Six to the media, which significantly improved conditions following numerous complaints from civilians (and reduced the number of escapees to zero, from 14 in 1990). Following the Prison Six rebellion of 1997, the concept of incarceration in the IDF was re-evaluated, which further improved conditions in all prisons.

== Procedures ==
Before a prisoner is taken in, they undergo an absorption procedure, similar to other prisons worldwide. In July 2009, biometric checks also entered this procedure. This is also used to check prisoners who are transferred or escorted to a courthouse.

== Prisoners ==
=== Prisoner types ===
The main types of prisoners in Israeli military jails are:

- Havush (Hebrew: חבוש, and pl. חבושים havushim) - from a legal point of view, any prisoner who was given a sentence called mahbosh by a trial officer (called disciplinary court - not in a military tribunal), which cannot exceed 70 days (and is usually 28 days or shorter) falls under this category. These are 'light' prisoners who generally committed paltry crimes such as refusing to shave. They are generally the most trusted prisoners and get privileges such as being allowed to work outside the prison or guard it. It is assumed that the vast majority of havushim would not run away from prison, since it would greatly increase their sentences and worsen their living conditions.
- Asir (Hebrew: אסיר, and pl. אסירים asirim) - any prisoner who has been on trial in a military tribunal and received a sentence called ma'asar (can be as short as one day). Sometimes only those with a sentence of greater than 100 days are thought to be asirim. These are more serious prisoners, generally involved in drug dealing, excessive violence, and other crimes deemed serious by military standards.
- Atsir lifnei mishpat (Hebrew: עציר לפני משפט, or על"מ Alam) - detainees awaiting trial, these have usually committed serious crimes which take longer to process. According to IDF law, any soldier must receive a trial within 48 hours of their detention; however, a trial may reach an inconclusive decision, which causes the detainee to remain on hold for a long time (possibly over a year). There are several types of such detainees, most notably deserters (soldiers who did not report to the army for over 45 days). All soldiers arrested by metzah, the investigations department of the military police, are also detainees awaiting trial.

=== Prisoner rights and responsibilities ===
Because all military prisoners in Israel, excluding Palestinian detainees (who have a different set of rights/responsibilities, derived from the Third Geneva Convention) are subject to IDF law, they receive the same rights and responsibilities as all other IDF soldiers, for example, the right to three meals per day, or the responsibility of following all orders from superiors (except those deemed clearly illegal). However, being prisoners, they have a set of additional rights and responsibilities which depend on the status of the prisoner, the length of their sentence, etc. Prisoners also have a set of rights (N.B.: in Anglophone usage, these are more commonly termed privileges instead of rights) that can be taken away by their superiors for bad behavior.

- The responsibility of adjusting to the environment - all military prisoners must adjust to their respective prisons immediately after they are given their first orders. Therefore, no first day excuse is to be accepted.
- The right to an interview - all inmates entering prison must be interviewed by the company commander, a service conditions NCO, a psychologist and the intelligence officer within 48 hours of their absorption. Similarly, all prisoners being released, as well as prisoners in detention centers, must be interviewed by an officer (without the other requirements).
- The right to see a psychologist and a service conditions NCO - within 48 hours of each prisoner's arrest, he is allowed to see a psychologist and a service conditions NCO. This is unlike regular soldiers who may have to wait up to two weeks to see any of the above.
- The right to see a lawyer - each prisoner in an Israeli military jail who has not yet been given his sentence may set up an appointment with a lawyer, from Sunday to Thursday.
- The right to receive basic provisions - each prisoner has the right to receive a toothbrush, toothpaste, soap and shaving blade upon request (called minor provisions), up to one time per 4 weeks. Major provisions which are handed out in special cases include towels, underwear, socks, etc. Additionally, each prisoner receives 3 army blankets (5 in wintertime), 2 uniforms, a belt, a work hat, and an army mattress. Army boots and a kitbag may also be given.
- The right to receive family payments - while prisoners don't receive the army salary while in jail, they are still allowed to receive family aid provided by the army.
- The right to appeal the punishment - each prisoner may appeal their punishment. There are numerous ways to do so:
  - Disciplinary appeal - for punishments given in a disciplinary court by a qualified officer. The appeal is sent to the commander of the officer in question. After 72 hours have passed from the handout of the punishment, the commander is no longer obligated to discuss the appeal.
  - Court appeal - for punishments given by the military tribunal. The appeals are sent to the Military Court of Appeals. A prisoner may further appeal to the Supreme Court of Israel, although the Supreme Court is not obligated to discuss the appeal.
  - Request for a disciplinary hearing - any prisoner who is set to be judged at the military tribunal for crimes that do not require this, may request a disciplinary hearing instead.
  - Request for a pardon by the major-general - any prisoner sentenced in disciplinary court may send a request to his commanding major-general to pardon him or lower his punishment.
  - Request for a pardon from the president - like prisoners in civilian jails, any military prisoner may request a pardon from the President of Israel.
  - Request for the cancellation of rights revokation - any prisoner whose rights in prison were revoked by a qualified officer, maybe appeal this decision to the prison commander (applies only to Prison Four and Prison Six).
- The right to parole and parole hearings - each prisoner may be paroled in certain circumstances:
  - One day is reduced for each ten days of punishment, starting from 11 days. May be revoked by certain officers, but this is generally not done in practice.
  - For prisoners sentenced to 100–180 days, the Chief Military Police Officer or the prison sector commander may reduced a third of the sentence, as long as the end result is not less than 90 days.
  - For prisoners sentenced to 181–365 days, the above authority is moved to the head of the Human Resources Directorate, or his deputy.
  - For prisoners with sentences higher than a year, only a parole committee may deduct a third of the sentence.
- The right to army visits - includes visits by attorneys and commanders ranked second lieutenant, first sergeant, or higher. These visits can generally be made during any time period, unlike family visits (see below).

==== Rights that can be revoked ====
The following rights (privileges) can be revoked on the authority of either a qualified officer (company or prison commander), or on the basis of certain intelligence against the prisoner.

- The right to canteen money and cigarettes - each prisoner receives 8 NIS per day to buy items from the prison canteen. Only Israeli-made cigarettes can be smoked in prison and all others (referred to as 'white cigarettes') found are to be revoked immediately.
- The right to make phonecalls - each prisoner has the right to make phonecalls to their close relatives, each lasting no more than 3 minutes. The amount of phonecalls per week varies from 1 to 3, depending on the prison/detention center. In practice, non-Palestinian prisoners generally have unlimited access to a phone (a calling card for which they can bring from home or buy with their canteen money) during their break time, although in some companies this right is more strictly observed.
- The right for family visits - most male prisoners may have a family visit of up to four adults 7 days from their absorption and once every 14 days afterwards. For reservists and female prisoners, this is shortened to 3 and 7 days, respectively.
- The right to send letters - each prisoner has the right to send up to 3 letters or postcards per week for free to any destination within Israel. Letters go through a censorship stage, except those addressed to Knesset members. In practice, this right is rarely exercised.
- The right for vacation - while often revoked on the basis of intelligence, each sentenced prisoner may receive a vacation outside of prison of up to 72 hours (generally 24-48) every 28 days. For prisoners on guard duty this is lowered to 21 days.

== Guards ==
All Israeli military prisons are guarded by the Military Police Corps. Guards, called prisoner instructors (Hebrew abbreviation: מד"כ madak) are responsible for guiding the prisoners through their daily schedules.

Every madak is also considered an IDF instructor and commander. However, plans are underway to change this, as ordered by Chief Military Police Officer Brigadier General Ronny Benny. As of August 2007, madakim are no longer considered IDF instructors, but have been given a unique aiguillette and pin.

== See also ==
- Prison Four, Prison Six - closed in 2021, replaced by the Neve Tzedek Prison
- Military Police Corps (Israel)
- Incarceration facility (Israel)
- Children in Israeli military detention
