= Military Police Corps (Israel) =

Military police of the State of Israel

- חיל המשטרה הצבאית
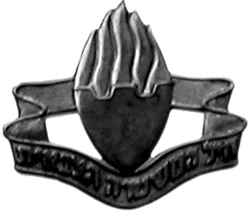
- Corps insignia
- Active: 1944–present
- Country: Israel
- Type: Provost
- Size: ~4,500
- Part of: Manpower Directorate
- Garrison/HQ: Tel HaShomer
- Motto: Military Police – People First
- Colors: Red–blue

Commanders
- Current commander: Tat Aluf Yuval Ya'amin

Insignia
- Shoulder Tag

- Corps Flag

The Military Police Corps of the Israel Defense Forces (Hebrew: חֵיל הַמִּשְׁטָרָה הַצְּבָאִית, romanized: Heil HaMishtara HaTzva'it; shortened to Mishtara Tzvait), commonly called "Mem Tzadik" or "Mem Tzadi", is the Israeli military police and provost. The military police serves the Manpower Directorate during peacetime, and the Technological and Logistics Directorate during war.

The military police is a brigade-sized of about 4,500, currently headed by Brigadier General Yuval Ya'amin. It is responsible for various law enforcement duties, including aiding IDF commanders in enforcing discipline, security of all military instillations, guarding the military prisons, locating deserters, investigating crimes committed by soldiers, and helping man the Israel Defense Forces checkpoints

The corps puts an emphasis on discipline and follows the principle of A Choice in Life, which says no to traffic accidents, narcotics, alcohol, suicide and improper use of weapons.

== History ==
=== Founding and initial organization ===
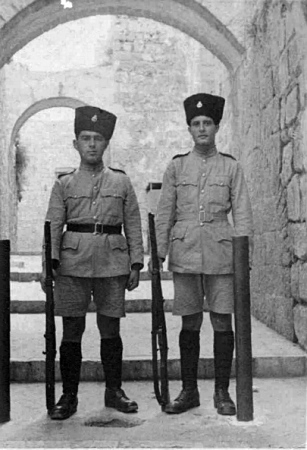
Notrim (Ghaffirs)—special policemen, 1937

The IDF's Military Police Corps traces its roots to a Jewish youth paramilitary organization called Notrim, founded in 1936. It was legal under British Mandate law, unlike its many counterparts such as the Haganah. Its original purpose was to defend and police Jewish yishuv localities during the 1936–1939 Arab revolt in Palestine. In 1937, the organization was given permission to expand, due to lack of British manpower allocated for defending Jewish villages in Palestine.

During World War II, the Notrim became part of the Jewish Brigade, where it grew and became more known among the Jewish public. Many new recruits joined the organization, where they went through a filtering process where it was decided what unit they were to be placed in. In 1944, an order was given by the Haganah to create its own military police in the Jewish Brigade, and the task was given to a captain therein, named Daniel Lifshitz (later Danny Magen). Lifshitz and three sergeants from the brigade who served at a base near Cairo, Egypt, were the initial nucleus of the organization, and recruited soldiers mainly from within the brigade itself.

To accompany military units into combat by marking the approach routes, to prevent desertion from the front, to deal with prisoners of war and soldiers who are harming the war effort

— Danny Magen, on the functions of the new corps,

During Israel's fight for independence between 1945 and 47, the Jewish leadership created the Military Police out of the organization, which became a small contingent of four units (Disciplinary Military Police, Traffic Supervision Military Police, Investigations Military Police, and the Prison Division), each proficient in its respective field. Originally, this force consisted of only 160 soldiers and officers, personally picked by the first commander, Danny Magen.

The force officially gained recognition in March–May 1948 as a result of the Riptin Commission and after the IDF formulated its disciplinary laws, and quickly expanded as the necessities of a military police service were made clear in the IDF. Originally, the traffic supervision units were organized into regions, serving in the most populated cities (Jerusalem, Tel Aviv and Haifa), while the discipline supervision units were subordinate to the various IDF brigades, with each brigade having its own small unit.

The headquarters and training base for the corps were set up in the Kiryat Meir base in Tel Aviv, then part of HaKirya compound. The first military police course took place during Israel's founding, including about 150 recruits and ending on June 2, 1948, immediately joined the effort to fight the invading Arab forces. The first course for women ended on August 20, 1948.

On October 13, 1949, the name of the military police was changed from Military Police Service (Sherut Mishtara Tzva'it) to Military Police Corps (Heil HaMishtara HaTzva'it). The first permanent headquarters were created on the ruins of the Arab village al-Shaykh Muwannis, today in Ramat Aviv (northern Tel Aviv), and the MP training base was also moved there.

A dog handler unit was founded in 1949 in the corps, consisting of about 50 soldiers and several hundred dogs. Its case was located in Kiryat Haim. The unit trained dogs to guard, assault, detect explosives and injured/dead bodies. Despite its many successes, it was disbanded on February 15, 1954, due to a lack of funding. Today, a similar unit is operated by the Israel Border Police.

=== World War II ===
The pre-IDF military police force in the Jewish Brigade operated on the Italian front between March 3 and April 25, 1945, when the brigade was stationed there. They were trained at a British police academy in the conquered territory near Naples, where they studied military law enforcement and motorcycle riding. The unit was responsible for placing road signs and doing regular police patrols. By the end of the war, the force consisted of 39 soldiers, excluding the commander, Danny Magen.

The force also aided Holocaust survivors in the liberated Nazi concentration camps. A police force with the Star of David as part of its insignia increased the hope and motivation of the survivors. In addition, it participated in the interrogations of Gestapo members and Nazi war criminals.

=== 1948 Arab–Israeli War ===
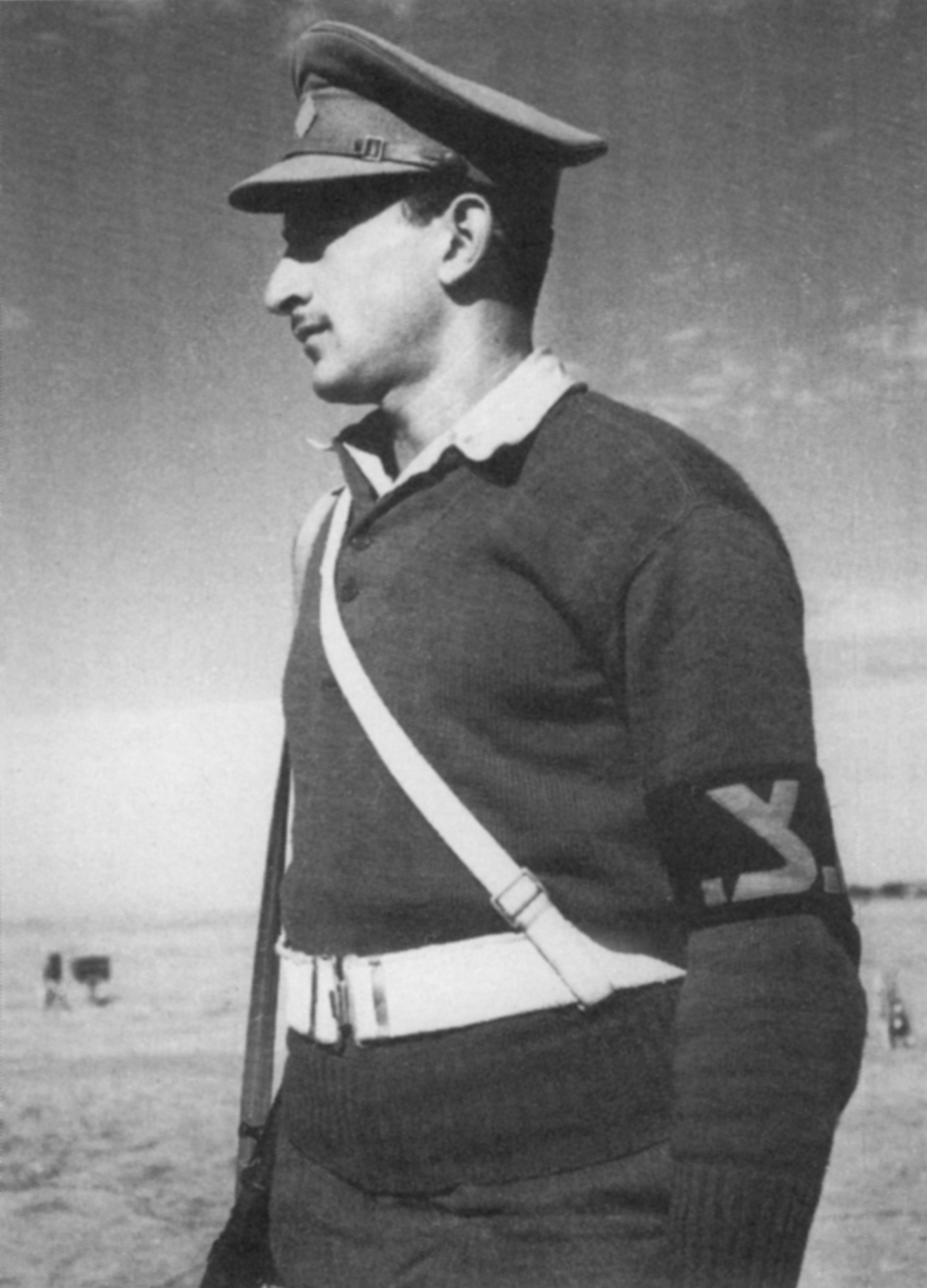
Military policeman in the 1948 Arab–Israeli War

In the 1948 Arab–Israeli War, the military police took both combat and supporting positions. In May 1948, the service was divided into regional fronts. The northern front, headed by future chief officer Yosef Pressman, consisted of 15 military policemen, most of them former Notrim, and was based in the police compound in Afula. It moved to Nazareth when the city was conquered from Arab forces.

Among others, the northern front's job was to deliver the Napoleonchik cannons, which turned the tide of several battles on the front. During Operation Brosh, a military police soldier managed to shoot down a Syrian plane using a Sten gun mounted on a jeep. The plane crashed near Ayelet HaShahar. The unit was also charged with stopping panicked Jewish residents of the Galilee from fleeing their homes, and Pressman personally stopped buses leaving Afula and Yavne'el, returning the men and evacuating the women and children to Haifa. After the completion of Operation Dekel, the military police was sent to Nazareth to enforce martial law, and worked directly under the military governor.

The military police was a major participant in Operation Shoter ("Policeman"). The operation was conducted during a ceasefire, which prohibited military actions, and was disguised as a military police law enforcement operation against an Arab uprising in Israel proper. A bus carrying two military police platoons made its way to Fureidis, where it prepared for an attack at dawn with the combat units. The attack failed and new recruits from the military police were called in as reinforcements. They reached a stalemate near Ayn Ghazal, and retreated on July 24 at 09:00. One military policeman was killed in action.

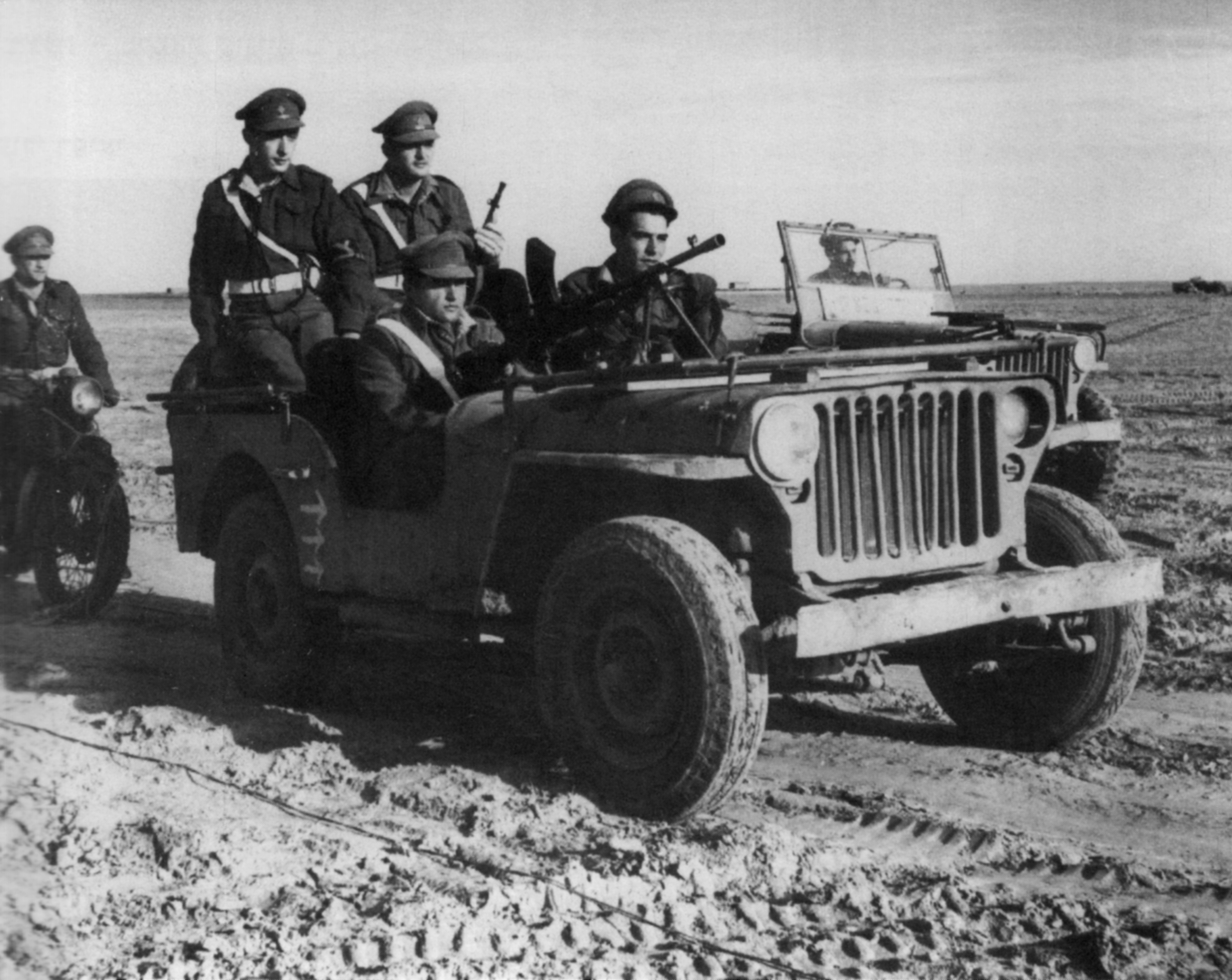
Military police vehicle in the 1948 Arab–Israeli War

On the Jerusalem front, a military police company, under orders from Moshe Dayan and the command of Capt. Ze'ev Katz, was responsible for rationing the sparse food and supplies between the besieged population. The company, whose authority had been expanded to include gendarmerie duties due to a lack of civilian police in the besieged city, also dealt with deserter location and crowd dispersal. On June 26, 1948, a mass Haredi rally against doing activities prohibited on Shabbat as part of warfare, was dispersed with nightsticks and live weaponry.

In the south, the military police participated mainly in Operation Yoav and Operation Horev, mostly by placing road signs and guiding troop movement. In Operation Ovda, a squad of MPs joined the Negev Brigade on their road to Umm-Rashrash. After the operation, they helped create an airstrip in the area.

=== Law enforcement operations 1948–56 ===
Aside from its combat duties during the War of Independence, the corps was active in its standard policing duties, as well as enforcing martial law in Arab towns and villages. Major operations and operations involving the civilian population were usually done in conjunction with the Israel Police.

In August 1948, information came in that a large percentage of the deserters of the time was living in the Kerem HaTeimanim neighborhood of Tel Aviv. In an operation codenamed Masrek ("Comb"), a strict six-hour curfew was imposed and a joint force of the military police and the Israel Police conducted house-to-house searches. More than 200 people were investigated, most of whom were transferred to the absorption base. Former Irgun members who refused to join the IDF following the Altalena affair were also arrested. The provisional military jail was overwhelmed with prisoners, and a mass-escape was staged on October 9, 1948. The prisoners returned voluntarily, but the event raised a scandal which saw the dismissal of several MP commanders, and the prison was handed over to the Kiryati Brigade and Palmach.

On September 17, 1948, after the murder of Count Folke Bernadotte by the Lehi, civilian and military police conducted a large-scale operation to arrest Lehi operatives in Jerusalem. Over a hundred members were arrested and taken through the Burma Road to the prison in Jaffa.

Following a deadly traffic accident near Ness Ziona on January 8, 1949, in which three IDF officers were killed, the military police initiated a nationwide law enforcement operation with the Israel Police, in order to curb traffic-related lawbreaking. It was codenamed Operation Mordechai (after Mordechai Nimtza-Bi, one of the officers killed in the traffic accident), which also served as the name for future missions with an identical purpose. During the original operation, almost 550 soldiers were caught and judged in a special ad hoc court, and approximately 1,700 civilians were issued fines. Two other major traffic supervision operations were carried out by the Military Police Corps in 1951 – the first on February 18, 1951, and the latter, Operation Bi'ur Hametz (not to be confused with the capture of Haifa), on April 21. Operation Bi'ur Hametz was conducted on a Shabbat, specifically to check the driving habits on this Jewish holy day.

The military police was also called into action during the austerity period in Israel, to combat the increasing black market on October 5, 1950. Roadblocks were set up and military vehicles were pulled over. Construction materials, furniture, home supplies, clothes and food were found in large quantities. The Criminal Investigations Division led the investigation efforts, which helped put many contrabandists in jail. In 1952, the Aluf Moshe Dayan of the Southern Command ordered the military police to instill order in the immigrant camps and ma'abarot in the south of the country.

Two major operations for locating deserters were carried out on May 10, 1952 (Operation Tihur – "Cleansing"), and in June of the same year (Operation UVaArta Hametz – "(You) cleansed for Passover"). After the two, similar operations were carried out at set intervals, and named Operation Small Filter for local jobs, and Operation Large Filter for nationwide operations.

Other than large-scale enforcement operations, MPs were also engaged in many ceremonial policing duties. In 1948 it was responsible for accompanying the first President of Israel, Chaim Weizmann, and subsequently guarded other notables and events. The corps guarded the 1951 IDF parade, the ballot boxes for Knesset elections, World Zionist Congress members, and sometimes the IDF Chief of Staff and Defense Minister of Israel. MPs also accompanied the British General Robertson on his visit, and other notables in Operation Harari on July 29, 1952, and Operation Hospitality on May 17, 1953.

=== 1956 Suez War ===
During the Suez Crisis of 1956, military police troops operated near the front lines, putting up road signs and escorting convoys in the Sinai Peninsula. Troops were allocated for finding IDF soldiers who lost their way. After the capture of Gaza by the 27th Armored Brigade, MPs escorting the brigade were stationed in the city to enforce martial law, and were later replaced by MPs from the Southern Command, who were stationed there in three ad hoc outposts to prevent looting and unnecessary contact between the IDF and the local residents. The MPs who accompanied the 27th Brigade continued with it to the Sinai Peninsula and helped evacuate the wounded in addition to their regular duties.

Until 1956, the issue of POWs was only brought up briefly in 1948, and temporary quarantines were set up without proper administration. The corps assumed responsibility due to their experience with military prisoners, and POW camps were set up in Nitzanim in the south and Atlit in the north, as well as a camp for officers in the Damun Prison. Temporary camps were erected in Nitzana, near the border crossing with Egypt, and near kibbutz Magen. In all, approximately 5,500-6,000 Egyptian POWs were held in Israel during and after the war.

As a result of the war and its lessons, the corps underwent numerous changes, including vehicle renewal, uniform changes and training exercises. Prison Six was constructed and better educational programs were introduced in the prisons.

=== Six-Day War and War of Attrition ===
In the Six-Day War, military policemen were placed in every major road intersection, especially in captured territory, and guided military traffic. Road patrols were created to mark road sections damaged by the Arab and Israeli forces, as well as minefields, and alternate routes were laid out.

MP platoons were present in the ten major combat brigades, and accompanied them into combat in the Sinai Peninsula. Outposts were erected in Gaza, Mount Libni, Abu Rudeis, el-Arish, Qantarah and Sharm el-Sheikh. From the moment an area was captured, MPs were ordered to make Hebrew road and direction signs, an operation which was completed ten days after the end of the war. A POW camp was built next to Mishmar HaNegev, through which about 5,000 Egyptian POWs were moved to the permanent camp in Atlit. In total, 6,748 POWs were captured by Israel, of them 5,237 Egyptian, 899 Jordanian and 572 Syrian. The corps was also responsible for preventing the rampant Arab looting within the Gaza Strip.

In the direct aftermath of the war, martial law was enstated in the West Bank, especially East Jerusalem, and the military police was called in to enforce it. The corps worked under the newly appointed military governor, then-Brigadier General Shlomo Lahat. The first MP base in East Jerusalem was located in the Saint George Hotel, and dealt with the prevention of looting, arrest of Arab militants, and blocking Israeli citizens from entering the newly acquired territories. Martial law was also enforced by MPs based at Gadot on the Syrian Druze villages of the Golan Heights, after their capture.

During the War of Attrition, the corps took a more combat-ready approach, moving its training base to the newly captured territories (near Kedumim), and assisting combat units in training exercises. Between 500 and 1,000 prisoners were taken out of Prisons Four and Six to temporary camps in the Sinai to build the Bar Lev Line. This worked so well that a permanent detachment of prisoners remained at Rephidim Air Base (Bir Gifgafa) and assisted in various chores.

The IDF also set up checkpoints at the bridges leading from the West Bank to Jordan, and military police were tasked with checking traffic and freight going through them for weapons and explosives. A special MP unit for guarding VIPs who passed through the area (Hebrew: מאבטח אישים משטרה צבאית, Me'avte'ah Ishim Mishtara Tzva'it, abbr. Ma'amatz) was created. A similar checkpoint and forward MP base was built at Quneitra.

=== Yom Kippur War ===
In the Yom Kippur War, the military police greatly assisted in the chaos of the surprise attack on Israel, guiding reserve reinforcements to their intended destinations. In the Sinai Peninsula, large quantities of military vehicles were to move quickly to the front lines, but the narrow roads and lack of direction created major traffic jams. MPs conducted battlefield circulation control operations in order to guide vehicle movement throughout the battlefield. The preventing of looting was also a major task, this was due to the chaos that was created as a result of the surprise attack during the initial stages of the war.

The corps took an active role on the southern front, joining with the major IDF divisions and even seeing combat. General Sharon handed the MP company in his division a mission to deliver the mobile pontoon bridges from the bases at Refidim and Rumani on October 15. Every vehicle on the way was taken off the road, sometimes by force. A newly arrived MP unit was then tasked with restoring order on the roads. It also constructed a temporary POW camp at Tasa. Another POW camp was erected on the Small Bitter Lake, by MPs who were part of Abraham Adan's 162nd Division. and an outpost was built in Fayid after its capture.

On the northern front, the military police's initial task was to help evacuate the frontal bases and the Golan Heights settlements. The northern command of the corps was relatively organized for the war, because the unit commander took the warnings that war was impending seriously and ordered all furloughs frozen. Even before the war started, work began on erecting two temporary POW camps – in Birya and Camp Yiftach. With the war's start, many MPs worked as part of the logistical support effort, while some aided the combat forces directly. At the end of the war, the MP company in the 149th Division (one of the main forces on the northern front) moved south and continued their reserve combat tour in the Sinai.

The Criminal Investigations Division (CID) was tasked by the head of the Manpower Directorate with finding Israeli MIAs, estimated at 900 at the time. They did so by getting testimonies, following the Arab media for news of POWs, searching for clues at the battle sites, as well as physical searches. As a lesson from the difficulty of the searches, the CID recommended that army boots be produced with a socket for an additional dog tag, a recommendation accepted and practiced ever since.

=== Lebanon 1978–2000 ===
The military police's mission in Operation Litani was to ensure order among the Arab civilian population in newly captured territory in Lebanon. The soldiers prevented looting, mainly between the Christian and Muslim populations, and rationed the sparse food supply. IDF troops were also guided by MPs in Lebanon, where Israeli forces were not present since 1949. A POW camp was erected in the Golan Heights, and roadblocks were set up on the Israel-Lebanon border and inside Lebanon to combat contraband.

The military police was involved in various ways in Operation Peace for Galilee, although the bulk of its duties were according to standard procedure. The corps had ample time to prepare for the operation and very specific designations were made for it as a result of the lessons learned from the Yom Kippur War. For the first time, it met a friendly population in Lebanon, which often cooperated with the IDF – this created a need for MP presence to prevent the soldiers from making illegal dealings with the locals. Placing road signs was a major issue, as for the first time a major city, Beirut, needed to be labeled, and enemy forces would certainly try to change the signs to mislead the IDF. To counter this, Graffiti was used on the city buildings to indicate direction.

Military police bases were built inside new IDF bases in Beirut, Sidon, Tyre and the Beqaa Valley. A permanent POW camp was built in Ansar, which operated until 1985. The base in Tyre suffered two explosions and MPs were killed in both – 12 in the first bombing on November 11, 1982, and several more on November 4, 1983. These events became known as the Tyre Catastrophes.

Some of the standard duties of the corps in Lebanon during and after war, was regulating Israeli travel in the country. Many IDF soldiers sought to hike and vacation in Lebanon despite the dangers, and met with an agreeable local population that profited financially. MPs conducted patrols to prevent soldiers from going into dangerous areas, especially north of the security zone held by Israel.

=== Post-1983 era and the intifadas ===
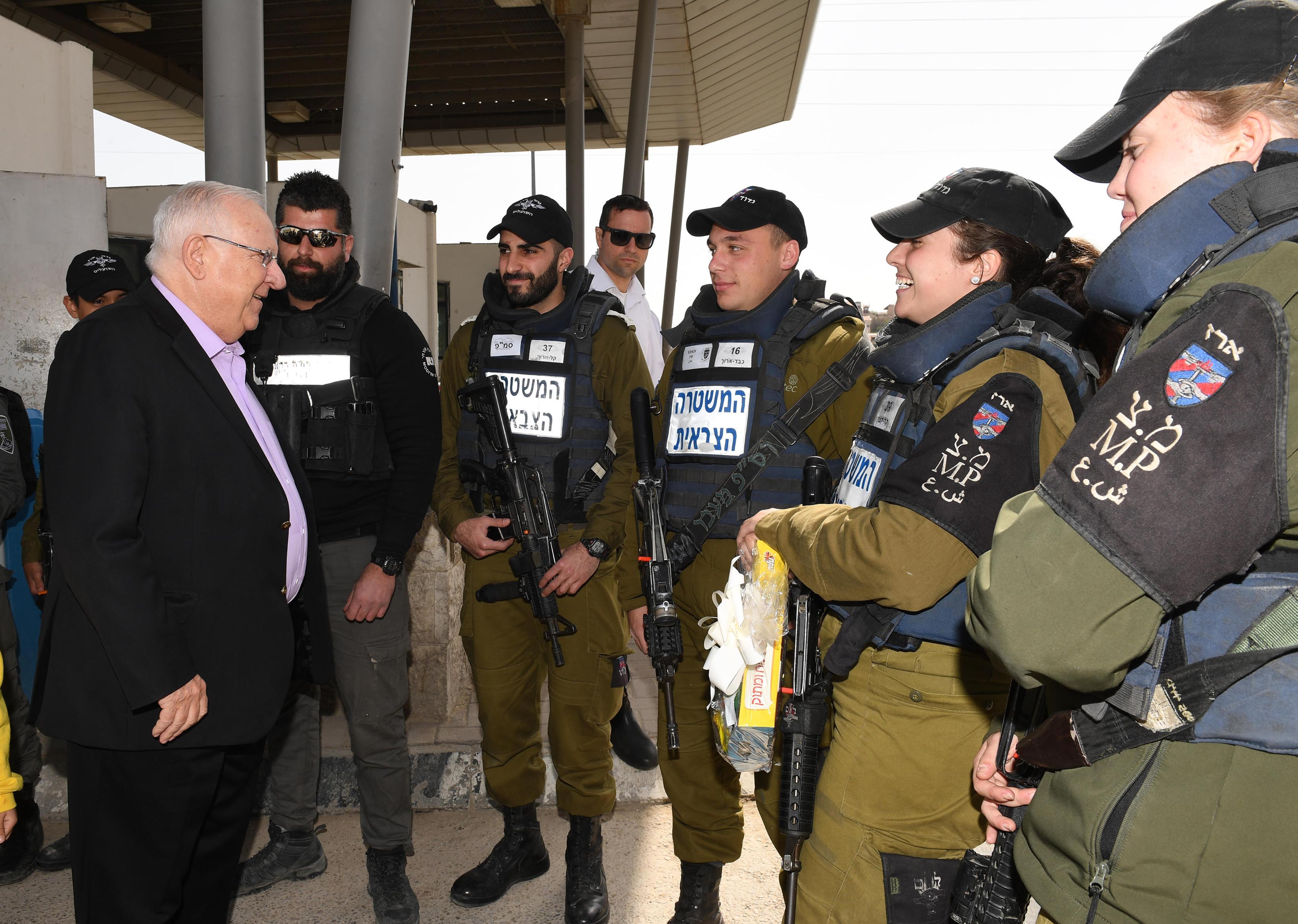
President Reuven Rivlin visiting military police officers in 2018

The military police has not been involved in emergency protocol since Operation Peace for Galilee, even in the Second Lebanon War. Major organizational changes were made in the corps following both the First Intifada and the Al-Aqsa Intifada.

In 1988, during the First Intifada, Ofer Prison and Ktzi'ot Prison were rebuilt, and Megiddo Prison stopped accepting Israeli military prisoners and changed its designation as a full-fledged incarceration facility for Palestinians. Smaller detention facilities were built in the bases near Dhahiriya, Tulkarem, etc. A special department in the corps headquarters was created to deal with Palestinian prisoners, and a special forces unit called Force 100 was founded to deal with rebellions in the prisons, and operated until 2006. A professional course for jailors who worked in these prisons was created.

A reserve military police unit, the 794th Battalion, was moved to the new Home Front Command, founded in February 1992. The unit's responsibilities were guiding traffic in the rear front, especially in the corridor between Acre and Ashkelon.

Another event that shook the corps was the Prison Six rebellion, which caused the complete re-evaluation of the concept of imprisonment of Israeli soldiers and led to major changes in the prison sector.

=== 2023 Gaza war ===
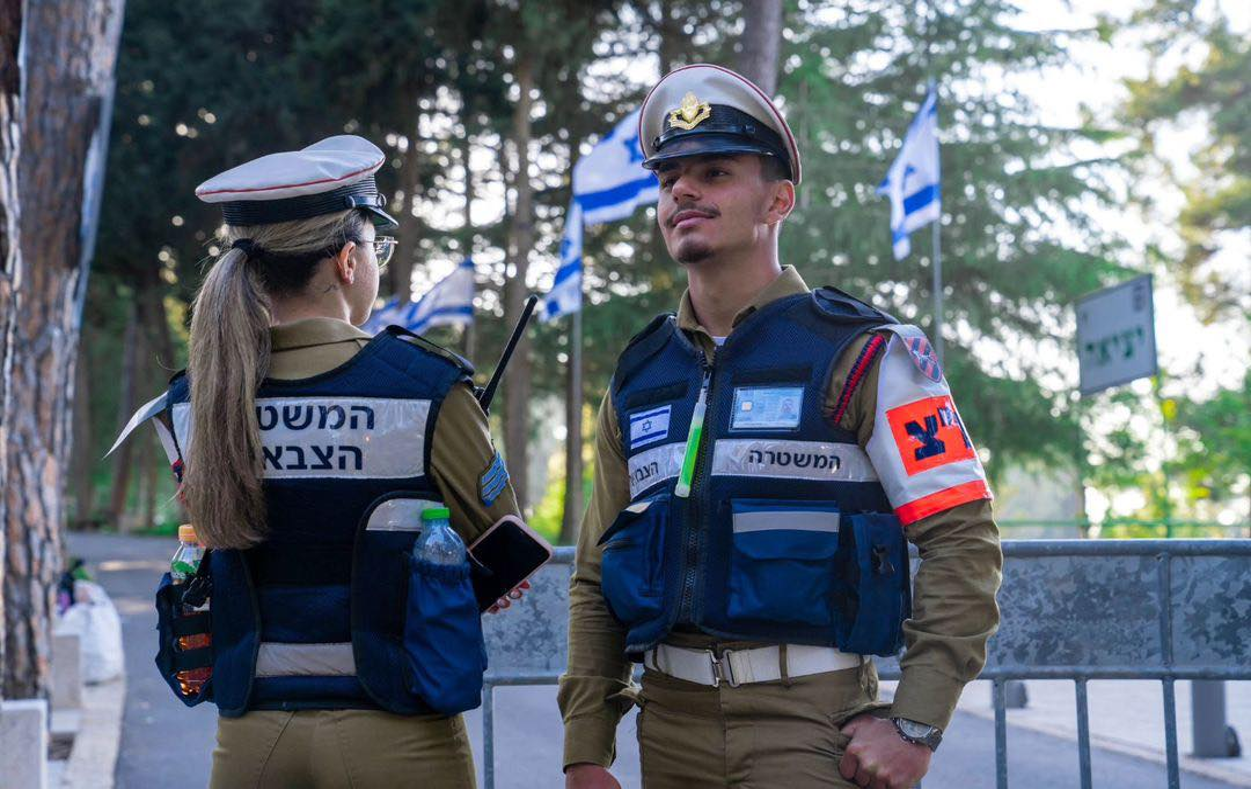
Military police officers in 2024

==== Arrests of force 100 members related to alleged gang-rape of prisoner ====
Members of the "force 100" "special forces", members of the military police corps were arrested in connection with the alleged gang-rape in the sde teiman detention camp.

== Training ==
=== Basic training ===
In the Israeli Military Police, recruits must complete the Extended Rifleman 02 basic training, which is 6 weeks long, making it one of the easiest basic training programs in the IDF. It is one of the most difficult types of basic training that is considered non-combat. Recruits must pass a test in basic law enforcement, after 2–4 days' worth of lessons, in order to finish the training. Military police recruit training puts a special emphasis on discipline.

While traditionally there were two companies in each round of recruits – a male company (Pashatz – Plugat Shotrim Tzvai'im) and a female company (Plugat Shotrot), starting in February 2006 the male and female recruits form one training company. Each platoon has recruits of only one sex. Commanders are of both sexes. Another company has been formed for recruits being trained to check Palestinians at checkpoints, which undergoes Rifleman 03 (more advanced training). The company is called Course Company (Hebrew: פלוגת מסלול, Plugat Maslul – Palmas).

All military police recruits are trained in a base called Bahad 13 (Bsis Hadrakha 13, lit. Training Base 13), which is part of the larger City of Training Bases (a.k.a. Camp Ariel Sharon), near Yeruham. Bahad 13 was established in Tzrifin in 1954, based on the previous training base in Tel Aviv. From there it moved to a location near Nablus and Kedumim in 1969, shortly after the Six-Day War. It was relocated to Camp Mota Gur near Netanya in 1995, and in 2015 became the first base in Camp Sharon.

Those who finish basic training must take a "basic course" (Hebrew: קורס יסוד, kurs yesod) in order to be able to take up their respective positions, which usually takes place in Bahad 13 as well. Formerly, each recruit also took a 1-month course in basic law enforcement and received the rank of private first class (turai rishon) at the end, a rank which has been discontinued.

=== Courses ===
Bahad 13, the military police training base, offers a multitude of courses, basic or otherwise. Many of the courses are carried out in conjunction with other military schools and training bases, such as the school for military law.

==== Basic courses ====
- Detectives' course (Hebrew: קורס בילוש, Kurs Bilush)
- Investigations course (Hebrew: קורס חוקרים, Kurs Hokrim), with the school for military law
- Jail instructors course (Hebrew: קורס מדריכי כלואים, Kurs Madrikhei Klu'im)
- Law enforcement and traffic course (Hebrew: קורס שיטור ותעבורה, Kurs Shitur VeTa'avura)
- Squad commanders course (Hebrew: קורס מפקדי כיתות, Kurs Mefakdei Kitot), with Bislamach, the school for Infantry Corps professions and squad commanders. Consists of a preparation course in Bahad 13 and the actual course in Bislamach.

==== Other courses ====
- Preparation for officers' course (Hebrew: הכנה לקצונה, Hakhana LeKtzuna)
- Corps officers' course completion (Hebrew: השלמה חיילית, Hashlama Heilit)
- Intelligence gathering course (Hebrew: קורס רכזי מודיעין, Kurs Rakazei Modi'in)
- Military Police Corps NCO course (Hebrew: קורס מש"קי חיל המשטרה הצבאית, Kurs Mashakei Heil HaMishtara HaTzva'it), a.k.a. Sergeants' course (Hebrew: קורס סמלים, Kurs Samalim)
- Senior discipline NCO course (Hebrew: קורס נגדים, Kurs Nagadei Mishma'at)
- Company commanders' course (Hebrew: קורס מפקדי פלוגה, Kurs Mefakdei Pluga)

==== Former courses ====
These courses, as well as the units they provided a service to, were disbanded after the transfer of prisons for Palestinian detainees held in Israel to the Israel Prison Service.

- Force 100 course (Hebrew: קורס כוח מאה, Kurs Ko'ah Me'a), including Lotar course
- Palestinian detainee jailors' course (Hebrew: קורס מטפלי עצורי השטחים, Kurs Metaplei Atzurei HaShtahim)

The following course was intended for majors. It has since been replaced by the course in human resources in Bahad 11.

- Senior company commanders' course (Hebrew: קורס מפקדי פלוגה בכירים, Kurs Mefakdei Pluga Bkhirim)

== Sectors ==
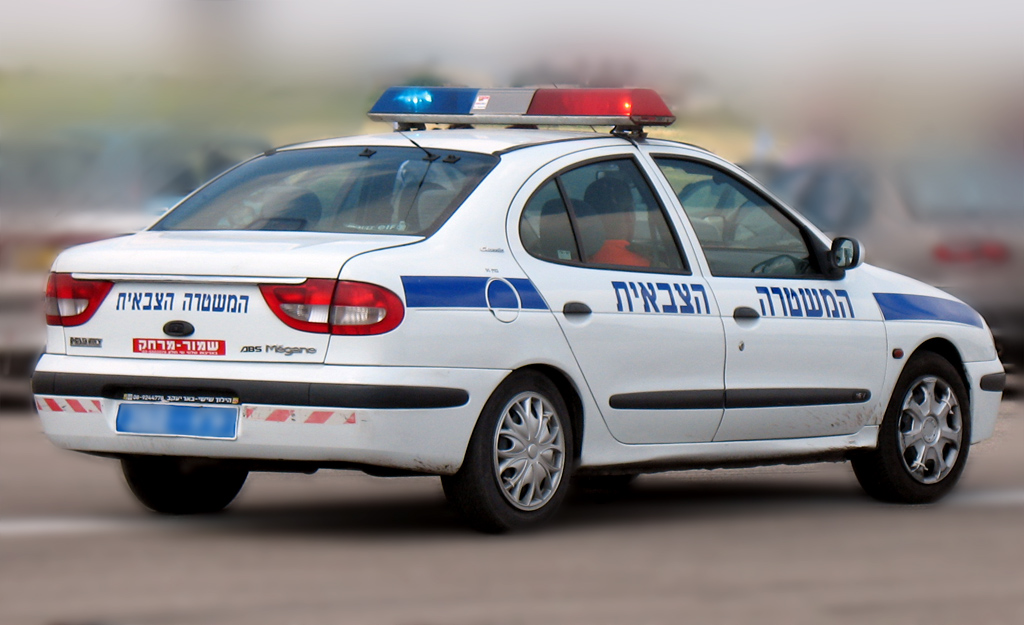
A Renault Mégane patrol car

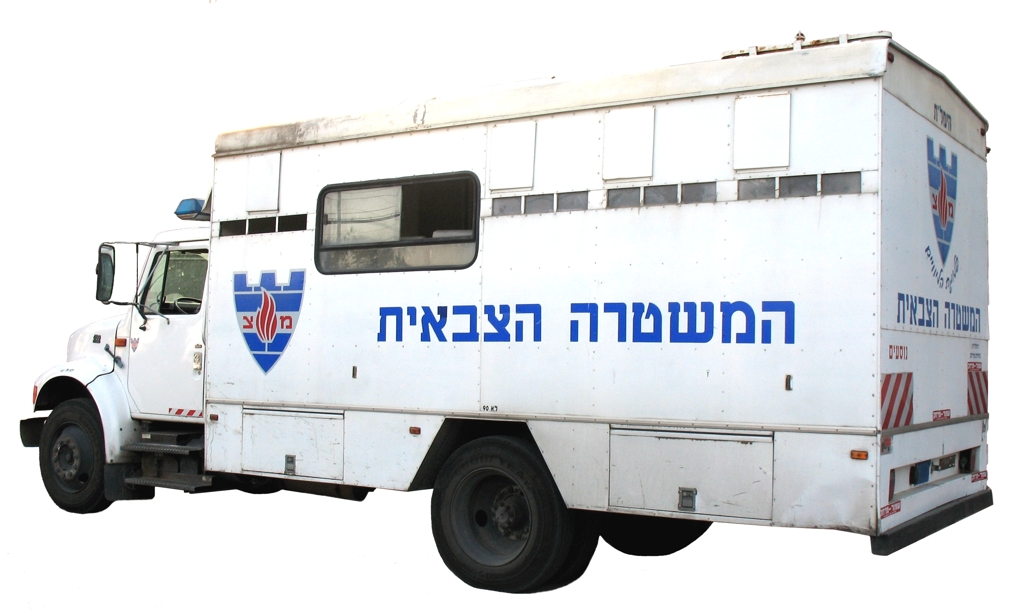
A truck for transferring prisoners (Hebrew slang: zinzana), used by the Yamlat's transfer company

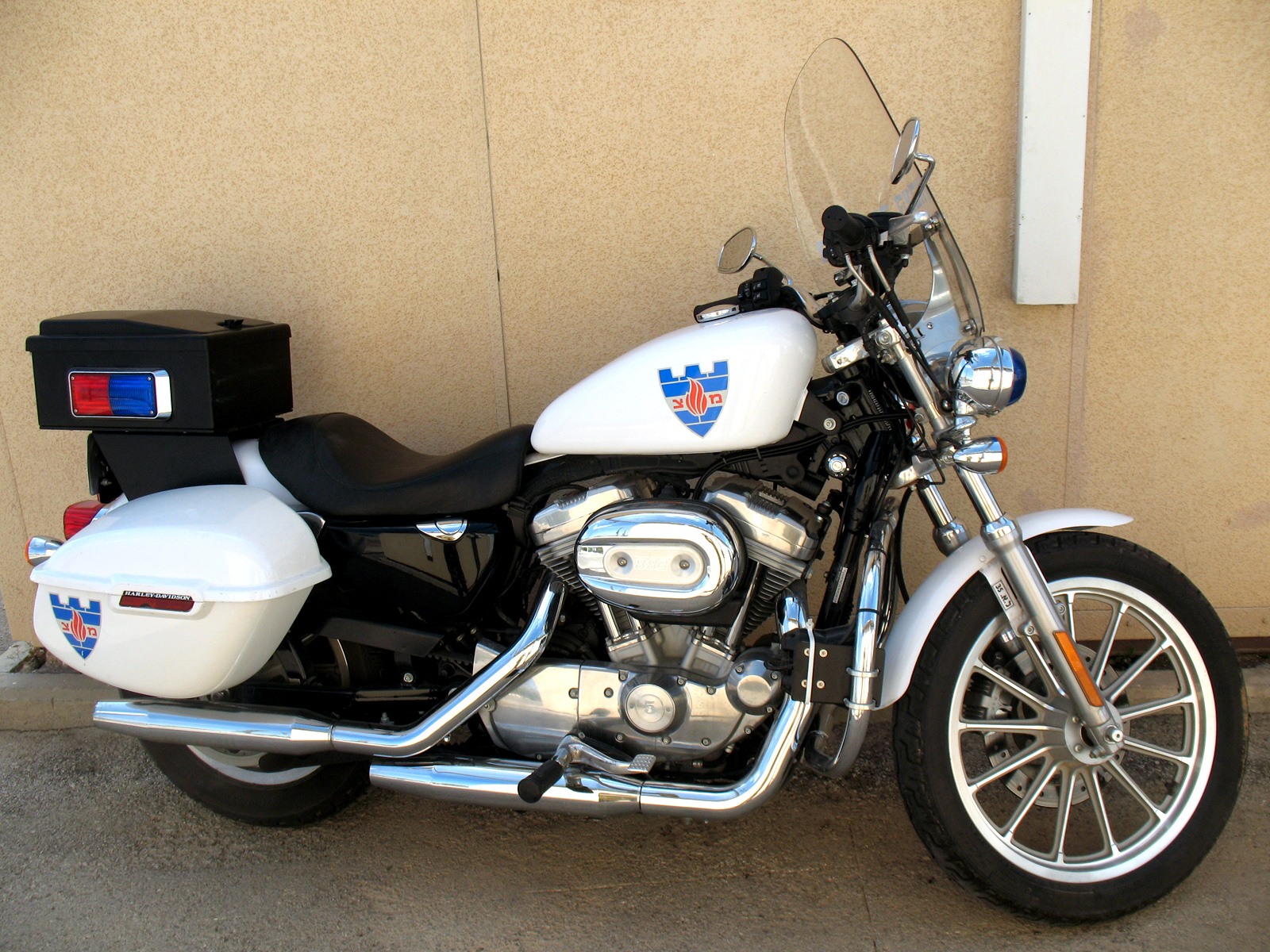
Harley Davidson

The military police has a multitude of sectors (migzarim), which carry out the responsibilities highlighted above. In addition, an instruction and training sector is present, like in all other IDF corps, and operates similarly to the others (see training above).

=== Law enforcement and traffic ===
The law enforcement and traffic (Shitur VeTa'avura) sector is responsible for enforcing the discipline, dress code, and proper driving by IDF soldiers. Soldiers in this unit often wear a peaked cap instead of the standard blue beret.

General law enforcement missions and other missions undertaken by policemen in this sector include:

- Traffic supervision patrol (Hebrew: סיור פיקוח תעבורה, Siyur Piku'ah Ta'avura, abbr. Sapat, often simply 'patrol' – Siyur) – the most common military police task, which involves driving through a specified set of roads and looking for traffic infractions made by military vehicles.
- Vehicle checkpost (Hebrew: מכמונת בדיקת רכבים, Mikhmonet Bdikat Rekhavim, abbr. Mabar) – military policemen check drivers' licenses and permissions for use of military vehicles.
- Discipline supervision (Hebrew: פיקוח משמעת, Piku'ah Mishma'at, abbr. Pei-Mem) – military policemen check the appearance of the soldiers.
  - Operation Appearance (Hebrew: מבצע מלביש, Mivtza Malbish) – a codename for an extended discipline supervision operation undertaken in many posts simultaneously (usually major transportation hubs and major military bases), sometimes involving all the law enforcement bases at the same time. A similar operation that involves immediately judging the soldiers is called Operation Good Manners (Hebrew: מבצע דרך ארץ, Mivtza Derekh Eretz). This was put on hold in 2005 but resumed in 2010.
  - Operation Iron Triangle (Hebrew: מבצע משולש הברזל, Mivtza Meshulash HaBarzel) – a codename for an extended discipline and traffic supervision operation undertaken in the three largest rear-front IDF bases (Tel HaShomer, Tzrifin, and the General Staff base) by the three MP bases in the area – MP General Staff, MP Dan, and the Yamlat unit.
  - Operation Night Kingdom (Hebrew: מבצע ממלכת לילה, Mivtza Mamlekhet Layla) – a codename for an operation for enforcing vehicle discipline, such as insuring that soldiers' family members don't drive military vehicles without accompaniment, etc.
- Radar gun (Hebrew: מד מהירות ליזר, Mad Mehirut Leizer, abbr. Mamlez) inspection – military policemen set up speed traps in order to catch speeding military vehicles using the LTI 20-20 radar gun. This is done as part of another mission, usually a patrol. Sometimes civilian vehicles are pulled over as well, but the military police has no immediate authority to issue reports on them, and the responsibility is moved to the Israel Police.
- Working with the National Traffic Police to catch military vehicles for misconduct.
- Transfer and guarding of injured enemies (Hebrew: שמירת פח"ע, Shmirat Faha) – done in conjunction with the Israel Border Police, military policemen guard injured Palestinians in Israeli hospitals (mainly Hadassah Ein Karem Hospital) before they are released and sent to prison. This responsibility passes to the Israel Police after 48 hours, but in practice may still be taken up by the military police for months.
- Conveyance of Palestinian families – when the families of Palestinian prisoners held in Ofer and Ktzi'ot prisons are allowed to visit, they are taken by bus from the checkpoints to the prisons, accompanied by military police patrol cars.

There is a special unit called the Yamlat (Yehida Meyuhedet LeFikuah Ta'avura – Special Unit for Traffic Supervision), founded in 1980 and located in Tzrifin, which is the main law enforcement unit. It has a law enforcement company and a company responsible for transferring prisoners between jails and detention centers. The law enforcement company is also responsible for honor guards, and is considered the Chief Military Police Officer's personal unit. Another mission which it specializes in are dummy kidnappings, called Operation Emulate/Dummy (Hebrew: מבצע מדמה Mivtza Medame), where an undercover police car picks up hitchhiking soldiers and reports on them (it is illegal for soldiers in uniform to hitchhike for security reasons).

The checkpoints department (security examinations sector) is also professionally subordinate to the law enforcement and traffic sector.

==== Report statistics ====
Below are some of the 2006–07 statistics for amounts of reports against soldiers for various misconducts, handed out by military policemen in the law enforcement sector:

	2006 amount	2007 estimate
Operations Appearance	6,787	7,488
Operations Iron Triangle	6,671	5,310
Increased enforcement operations	295 (5 operations)	178 (3 operations)
Dummy kidnappings	678	576 (77 to combat and 499 to non-combat)
Speeding tickets	1,178 (~1,100)	1,866 (~1,800)
Total	32,765	30,837

=== Prison service ===
The prison service (Kli'a) sectors guards Israeli military prisons. It is divided into two: the service responsible for guarding prisons and detention centers with Israeli prisoners, and the service responsible for guarding the two detention centers containing Palestinian detainees, Shomron and Etzion. When the military police controlled the major detainment prisons, Megiddo, Ofer and Ktzi'ot, each of the two sub-sectors has a unique training course. As of 2007 however, all jailors undergo the jail instructors' course. The actual jailors, or jail instructors, are considered IDF commanders for all intents and purposes.

The prisons are run by jail instructors (Hebrew: מדריכי כלואים, Madrikhei Klu'im or Madakim) are responsible for instructing Israeli prisoners (soldiers who committed crimes or infractions), making sure they don't escape, and rehabilitating as many as possible.

The prison service sector started out as the Prison Division (Hebrew: מחלקת בתי הסוהר, Mahleket Batei HaSohar) until it became a separate sector in 1974. It was originally responsible for maintaining the provisional military prison in Tel Aviv, until Prison Four was built. Various services were introduced into the sector with time, such as education in 1977 and gahelet in the 2000s, as programs for rehabilitation. Additionally, the Prison Six revolt in 1997 revolutionized the IDF's approach to military prisons, and many new measures were introduced, in order to improve the conditions of prisoners and jailors alike, as well as make it harder for prisoners to escape and stage further revolts.

When the military police was responsible for jails containing Palestinian detainees (until 2006), there were two additional subsectors:

- Palestinian detainees jailors (Metaplei Atzurei HaShetahim or M. Atzhashim) are mostly responsible for making sure that the prisoners do not escape.
  - Company for Special Missions (Hebrew: פלוגה למשימות מיוחדות, abbr. Palmam) was a company in each prison responsible for protecting the jailors from harm as well as transferring the Palestinian prisoners to courts and other outside locations.
- Force 100 (Koah 100), a combat-certified unit responsible for suppressing uprisings mainly by both Palestinian prisoners. The unit consisted of less than 100 soldiers and was used in full only in extreme cases of violence and prison rebellions.

=== Criminal investigation ===
The Criminal Investigations Department (Hebrew: משטרה צבאית חוקרת, Mishtara Tzva'it Hokeret, abbr. Metzah) is a brigade-level unit in the IDF responsible for all criminal investigations involving military personnel. The unit primarily deals with the use of drugs in the army, and theft of and dealing in army weapons. Other investigations include corruption, sexual harassment and assault, suicides, killings and abuse of civilian Palestinian population (done by a special unit that works in the West Bank), and treason. The unit also deals with traffic accidents involving military vehicles.

The investigations division was originally made up of poorly trained soldiers, as well as civilian lawyers, who relied solely on military law, which was based on British law and not always realistic or up to date. Only in 1995, the Military Judgement Law was formulated and organized military protocol.

The CID mainly dealt with theft and smuggling charges. Originally its headquarters were located in Camp Dora in Netanya, but as part of the initial organization of the corps, they were moved to Haifa, and bases were built in Jerusalem, Camp Beit Lid and the base near Qastina. The military police command saw the importance of the investigations division and decided that only high school or higher graduates (at that time, most soldiers had not finished 12 years of high school) should be taken into the division, and their training was conducted by the much more professional Israel Police. Slowly, the investigations division became a professional sector and is now considered the most prestigious sector in the military police.

The division was involved in investigating the Kafr Qasim massacre during the Suez War and the 1954 Lavon Affair in 1960.

With the introduction of the computer in the IDF in the late 1970s, tracking stolen goods and weapons became significantly easier, and in 1980 a sharp drop was registered in successful weapon thefts.

The division has several specialized and/or elite units:

- A secret unit called Yamlam (Hebrew: יחידה מרכזית לחקירות מיוחדות, Yehida Merkazit LeHakirot Meyuhadot, lit. Central Unit for Special Investigations), founded in 1982, which conducts high-profile investigations. Some are done together with the Israel Police and the Shabak.
- CID Traffic Accidents (Hebrew: מצ"ח תאונות דרכים, Metzah Te'unot Drakhim), which investigates traffic accidents pertaining to military vehicles. The unit is based in Tzrifin.
- National Unit for Fraud Investigations (Hebrew: יחידה ארצית לחקירות הונאה, Yehida Artzit LeHakirot Hona'a, abbr. Yaha), which investigates white-collar crime, mainly by high-ranking officers and NCOs.
- The Unit for Internal Investigations (Hebrew: יחידה לחקירות פנים, Yehida LeHakirot Pnim, abbr. Yahkap), which was founded in 1994 and is not officially subordinate to the CID. It is responsible for investigating certain crimes committed by soldiers in the Military Police Corps. The unit consists mainly of reservists formerly from the CID, and is directly subordinate to the Chief Military Police Officer.

=== Intelligence and detection ===
Intelligence and detection (Hebrew: מודיעין ובילוש, Modi'in UVilush) is a sector responsible for gathering intelligence for the numerous military police sectors (this varies in nature across sectors), operational protection of military policemen during their missions, and the location and arrest of AWOLs. Before 2006, this sector was intelligence-only and the operational part was subordinate to the CID and the law enforcement sectors. It is currently professionally subordinate to the head of the CID. The sector traces its roots to the Recruitment Police (Hebrew: משטרת גיוס, Mishteret Giyus), a small unit of the corps, founded in 1948.

In military prisons, intelligence collectors (Hebrew: רכזי מודיעין, Rakazei Modi'in or Ramanim) are responsible for working with collaborators within jails to find out information about potential suicides, rebellions, etc. therein. In the CID, they gather intelligence about soldiers who have committed crimes, in order to locate and arrest them and/or find evidence against them. In the law enforcement sector, a small team of intelligence collectors aids the detectives in each law enforcement base.

Detectives are the operational force of this sector. They aid the CID and law enforcement sectors in various missions, and are generally known for brute strength. They are usually wear disguises.

Some detectives started their service in one of the IDF special forces units.

In the law enforcement sector, there is a small contingent of detectives in each base – a unit referred to as HaMahlaka LeItur UMa'atzar (abbreviated to לאו"ם, Le'om), meaning The Division for Identification and Arrest. It is responsible for catching deserters (generally, those AWOL for over 45 days) and 'shirkers' (those who haven't shown to military duty at all), as well as protecting military policemen during major discipline supervision operations. In the CID, they are generally responsible for protecting the actual investigators and intelligence collectors, as well as searches and other order execution.

=== Security examination ===
Security examinators (Hebrew: מאבטחים בטחוניים, Me'avhenim Bithoni'im or Ma'ab, a.k.a. Checkpoints – Ma'avarim) is a sector founded in 2004, although it had been in planning since 2002 and the order for its founding was laid down on January 13, 2003. The sector's soldiers check non-Israelis at Israel Defense Forces checkpoints (including border checkpoints with enemy states). It expanded rapidly in its initial few years, with a new headquarters built especially for it (but now used only by the Ta'oz Battalion) between April 2004 and 2006 in Camp Mota Gur, next to Bahad 13. It is considered a combat support unit with high risk, but a low-prestige unit within the corps. Even so, it is more highly respected by non-MPs than traditional military police units.

The first security examination course at Bahad 13 took place in November 2003. The course lasts four weeks plus a week of basic Arabic lessons.

The sector is divided into two battalions—Erez, which monitors most checkpoints around Jerusalem, and Ta'oz, manning all other military police-run checkpoints. The Erez battalion lists three companies; Alef (A), Bet (B) and Gimel (C). The Ta'oz battalion lists the following companies: Eyal (אייל), Maccabim (מכבים), Reihan (ריחן), Sahlav (סחלב) and Shomron (שומרון). Other than these battalions, soldiers in the sector also help man crossings at Ghajar and Rosh HaNikra (Lebanon), Quneitra (Syria), and Erez and Kerem Shalom (Gaza Strip).

Since its founding in 1995, the Erez Battalion was under the jurisdiction of the West Bank Division and was operated by multiple corps, with the military police sending some soldiers. What is currently known as the Ta'oz Battalion was, in turn, called the Checkpoints Unit (Hebrew: יחידת המעברים Yehidat HaMa'avarim). During 2004–2006, Erez was transferred to the military police and included in the sector (officially subordinated to the corps in February 2006), while the prior MP checkpoint unit was renamed to Ta'oz Battalion.

The ma'avarim shoulder insignia was unveiled in a ceremony in July 2004. The two hands on it symbolize the striving for co-existence between the two sides. The eye represents the constant watch for those who wish to harm this co-existence. This insignia is now only used by the Ta'oz Battalion, with Erez having a different emblem.

== Sectors and operations during emergency ==
During an emergency such as war, when there is a general reserve call-up, the Military Police Corps changes many of its designations and its structure. Although the reserve force in the corps is comparatively small (approximately 4,000-4,500 troops at any time), the reservists take up most of the emergency positions and many of the regular units are incorporated into the reservist force.

The emergency doctrine of the corps traces its roots to a document based on lessons learned from the 1948 Arab–Israeli War, after which the first emergency training was conducted in February 1951. A more detailed work titled "Military Police in the Field" was published to MP officers in December 1953.

While regularly, the corps serves under the Manpower Directorate, during an emergency it moves to the Technological and Logistics Directorate. There are two types of military police units during an emergency: frontal and rear. The frontal units serve under five of the six regional logistical support units (Hebrew: אגד לוגיסטי מרחבי, Eged Logisti Merhavi), while the rear units are under the direct command of the three regional commands.

Emergency operations of the corps mainly include directing traffic at major roads and intersections, law enforcement, erecting road signs in conquered territory, and the guarding and transfer of POWs.

=== Frontal units ===
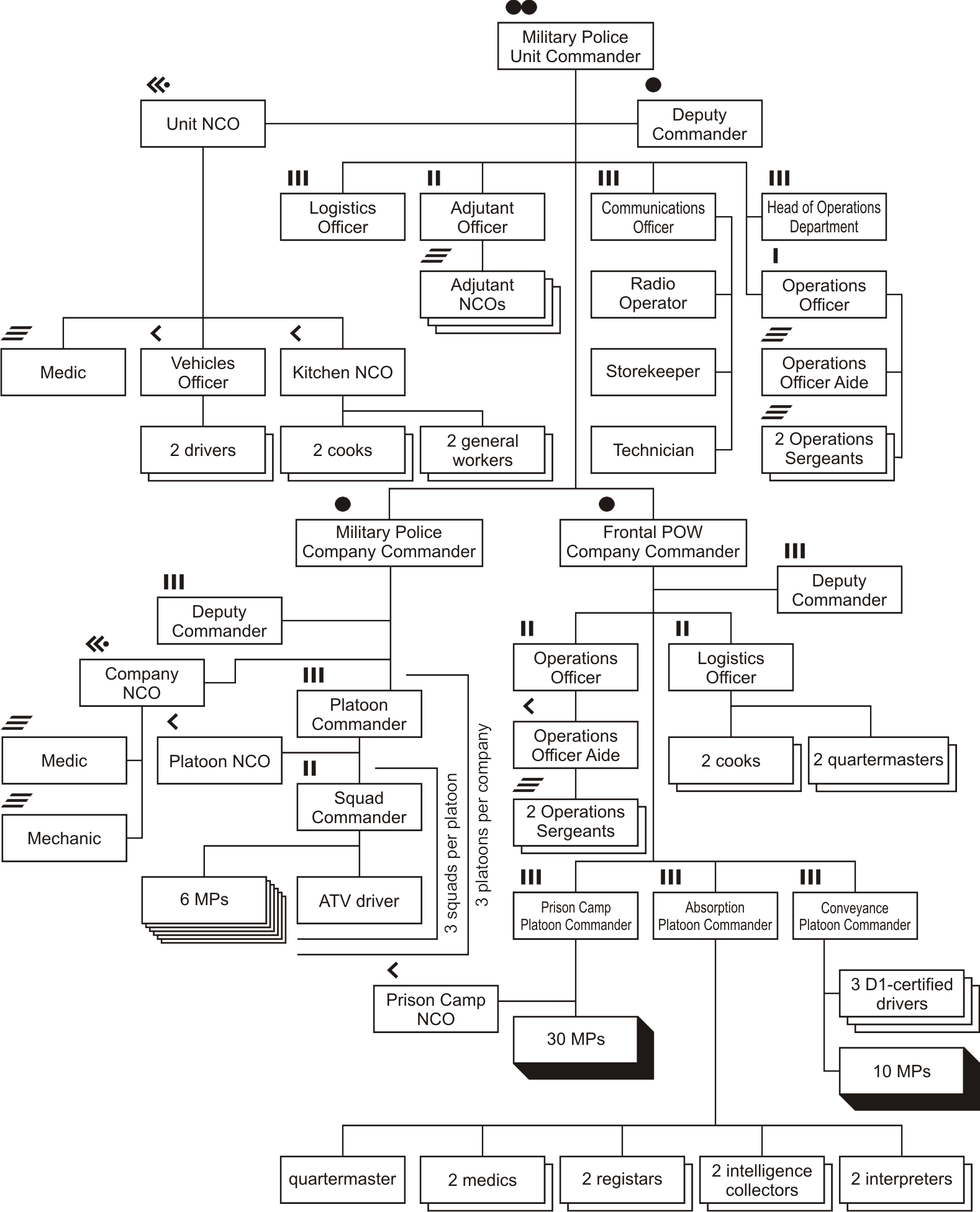
Organization chart of the Military Police Unit and its sub-units

Each frontal military police unit is the size of a battalion, commanded by a lieutenant colonel. It is called Military Police Unit (Hebrew: יחידת משטרה צבאית, Yehidat Mishtara Tzva'it, abbr. Yahmatz), and exists in four of the six logistical support units. It is completely absent in Regional Logistical Support Unit 5004 (belonging to the Central Command), because there is no front in the IDF Central Command since the peace treary with Jordan. In Regional Logistical Support Unit 5003 (southern Golan Heights), only the law enforcement and traffic directing company of the Military Police Unit is present.

The Military Police Unit is divided into two companies: the law enforcement and traffic directing company, called Military Police Company (Hebrew: פלוגת משטרה צבאית, Plugat Mishtara Tzva'it), and the POW transfer and guarding company, called Frontal POW Company (Hebrew: פלוגת שבויים קדמית, Plugat Shvuyim Kidmit).

==== Military Police Company ====
The Military Police Company is responsible for all the law enforcement and traffic directing missions, as well as erecting road signs, assisting troop movement, and operating Frontal Supervision Points (Hebrew: נקודת פיקוח קדמית, Nekudat Piku'ah Kidmit, abbr. Napak), which allow combat troops to receive orders and directions in conquered territory.

Ideally, each Military Police Company consists of 3 platoons, each consisting of 3 squads. A squad has a commander, an all-terrain vehicle driver and two ATVs, and six military policemen. The company also has one medic and one mechanic.

==== Frontal POW Company ====
The Frontal POW Company is responsible for taking prisoners of war from the combat units, transferring them to temporary camps (each camp is erected by the company in four days and can contain up to 500 POWs), then sorting and transferring them to permanent regional (command) POW camps within 72 hours.

Each company lists 3 platoons: a transfer platoon, an absorption platoon which sorts prisoners (this platoon also has medics, intelligence gatherers and translators for correct absorption and sorting), and a platoon responsible for the temporary POW camp.

=== Rear units ===
The rear unit of the Military Police Corps during wartime is called the Command Law Enforcement Unit. It is a brigade-level unit headed by a colonel. There is such a unit in the Northern, Central and Southern commands. In the Central Command, the unit is subordinate to the Regional Logistical Support Unit 5004. Each Command Law Enforcement Unit consists of three battalions:

- Law Enforcement Battalion: headed by a lieutenant colonel, this unit is responsible for all law enforcement duties on the inside of the country. It functions similarly to the regular law enforcement units.
- Command POW Camp: headed by a lieutenant colonel. Each POW camp is permanent and can contain up to 3,500 prisoners. The Northern Command camp is located at Camp Elyakim, the Central Command camp is in Ofer Prison, and the Southern Command camp is in Ktzi'ot Prison.
- Military Police Command Unit: one of the three regular, non-reservist law enforcement units (390, 391 and 392), headed by a major in an emergency. In the central command, this unit (391) is not subordinate to the Command Law Enforcement Unit.

=== National POW Camp ===
The National POW Camp is a unit which takes in all POWs from the Frontal POW Company who are either injured or are considered quality soldiers (officers, pilots, senior NCOs, etc.). The quality POWs are sent to the national camp in Prison Six. The 393rd Reserve Battalion is responsible for guarding them.

The injured POWs are the responsibility of Reserve Unit 5014 and are sent to one of four hospitals: Kaplan Hospital (Rehovot), Asaf HaRofe Hospital (Rishon LeZion/Be'er Ya'akov), Tel HaShomer Hospital (Ramat Gan/Tel HaShomer) or Barzilai Hospital (Ashkelon).

== Insignia ==
The military police pin, called Hamatson

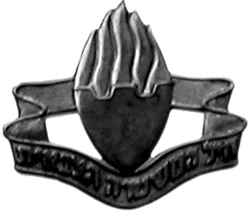
Military Police crest

The Israeli Military Police wears a blue beret, introduced in 1998, and its symbol is a flame. On the beret, the flame is surrounded with a banner-like curve, which says Heil HaMishtara HaTzva'it (military police corps). The military police pin image consists of blue bricks and the letters Mem and Tzadik (Mishtara Tzva'it, i.e. Military Police).

The shoulder insignia varies based on the soldier's position. It is always on a blue and red background (See Shoulder insignia below).

Most military policemenwear a blue and red aiguillette, which has two forms – vertical lines for law enforcement and deserter trappers, horizontal lines for security examinators, and mixed thread for investigations, intelligence and detection. Some wear a green aiguillette, indicating a commander, used by the prison sector and in the training base. The aiguillette is worn over the left shoulder, and attached to the left shirt pocket.

=== Uniform ===
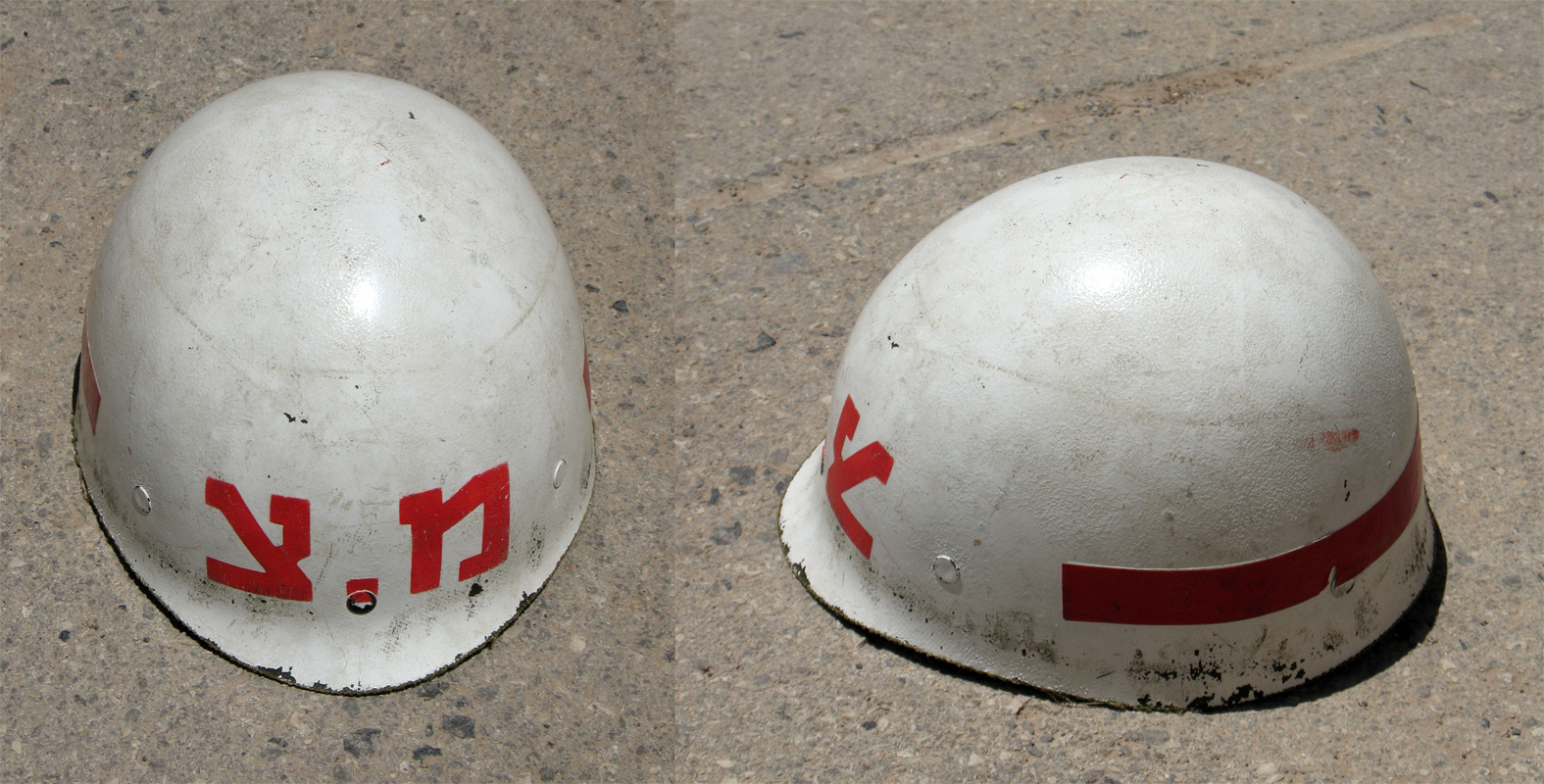
A military police helmet, used before the modern peaked cap came into being in 1989.

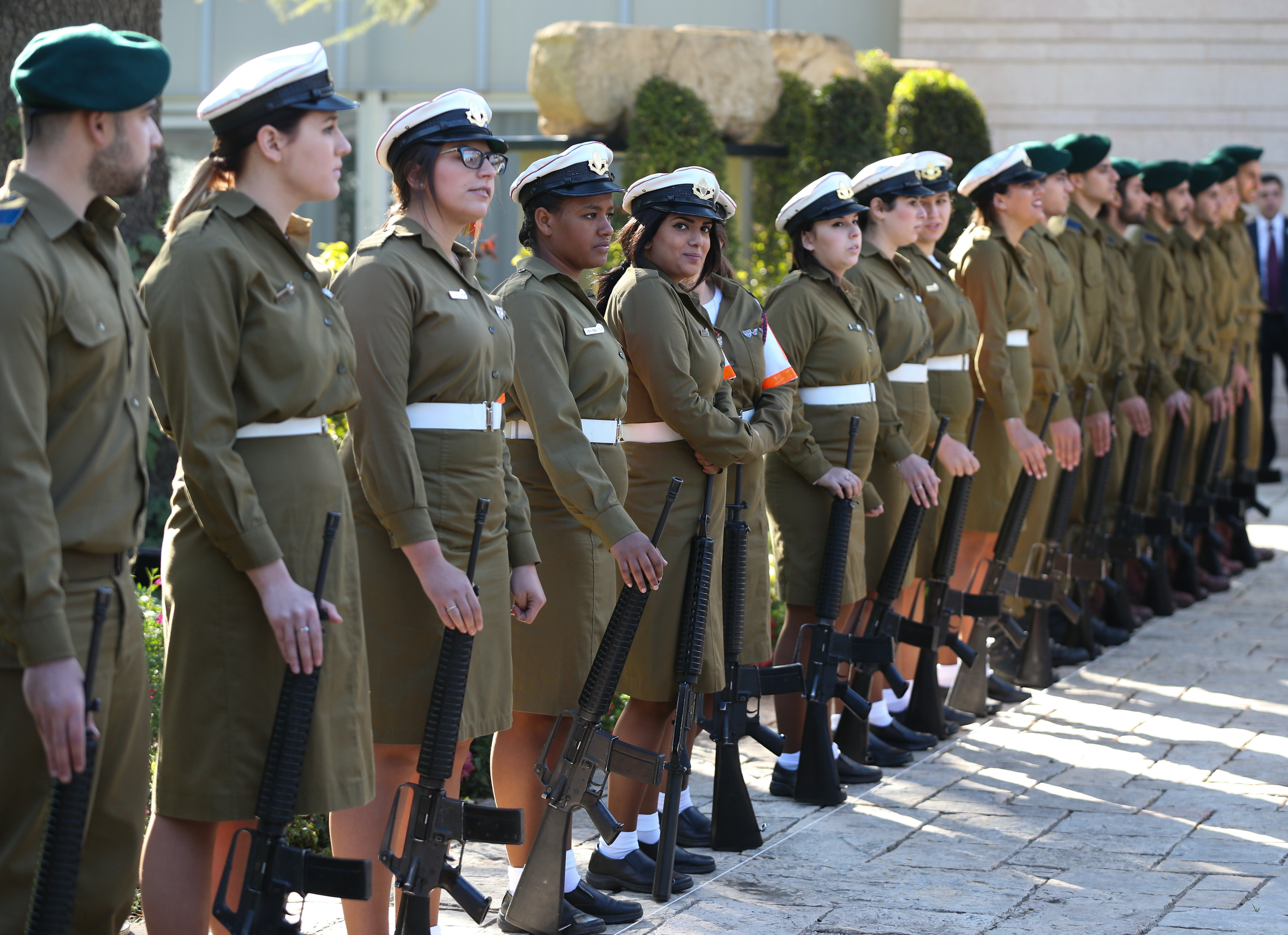
IDF female Military Police wearing skirts with their White caps and belts.

The ceremonial dress of the Military Police Corps is an IDF regular uniform, with a white peaked cap, a brassard with the letters Mem and Tzadik on the left arm, and a white pistol belt. This dress is also worn on duty, mostly by MPs performing discipline patrols in public places (train and bus stations, entrances to large bases, etc.) In the past, a white helmet with the letters Mem and Tzadik was used in place of the peaked cap.

Jail instructors on duty wear only the brassard, as well as a black leather belt, along with a work uniform and optionally a prison sector cap, with sergeants wearing a similar blue brassard. The security examination (checkpoints) sector wears a sector cap, as well as a black brassard with "MP" written in Hebrew, English and Arabic.

=== Brassards ===
The Israeli Defense Forces use a brassard similar in size to the US brassard. Various coloured brassards have been seen to be worn by the Israeli Military Police. These include white with red lettering, red with either blue or black lettering, blue with white lettering, black with white lettering, and white with black lettering on orange patches with a wide orange border along the bottom of the brassard. Formerly a red armband was worn with blue or black lettering.

=== Flag and emblem ===
The flag of the Military Police Corps.

The military police flag is a standard 3:4 banner, divided into blue and red halves with a diagonal line.

The military police emblem, designed in 1949, consists of a shield and five flame tongues which, according to the creators, represent the five unbreakable truths of the military police: Purity of the arm, purity of arms, purity of heart, purity of action and purity of the eye. By contrast, the military police pin, or hamatzon, has only four flame tongues. A sixth flame tongue is sometimes added to specific unit insignia, symbolizing the purity of scale.

=== Training insignia ===
Recruits and other trainees in the military police, as all IDF trainees, wear improvised shoulder ribbons to indicate their platoon. Until 2006, The male recruit company Pashatz (Plugat Shotrim Tzvaiyim) wore single-colored bands, while the female company (Plugat Shotrot) wore dual-colored bands. The male company's symbol was a dragon, while that of the female company was a lioness' head. In February 2006, the two were merged into the Pashatz, and a checkpoint company called Palmas (Plugat Maslul) was created.

=== Shoulder insignia ===
Most units or major bases in the military police have their own shoulder insignia:

- Bahad 13 – a book with a sword and flame. This is worn by the personnel at the Bahad 13 base as well as all soldiers who take a professional course at Bahad 13.
- Me'avhenim Bithoni'im (Ta'oz Battalion) – an eye with two hands and a flame. This is worn by all personnel in the Ta'oz Battalion, a unit which checks Palestinians at Israeli checkpoints not encompassing Jerusalem.
- Me'avhenim Bithoni'im (Erez Battalion) – an eye with two hands and a flame, as well as an ornament at the top, which represents the mountains of Jerusalem and the walls of the old city. This is worn by all personnel in the Erez Battalion, a unit which checks Palestinians at checkpoints encompassing Jerusalem.
- Prison service (Kli'a) – the hamatzon's brick background with a book and a flame. Worn by all personnel in military jails.
- Criminal Investigations Division (Metzah) – an eye with weighing scales, a magnifying glass and a key. Worn by all policemen in the investigations department.
- Headquarters (Mekamtzar) – a regular flame on a red and blue background. Worn by all personnel working in the Mekamtzar (military police command headquarters). Also worn by Yamlat soldiers.
- Northern command – the symbol of the northern command (a deer) on a red and blue background. Worn by military policemen (law enforcers) in the northern command.
- Central command – the symbol of the central command (a lion) on a red and blue background. Worn by military policemen (law enforcers) in the central command.
- Southern command – the symbol of the southern command (a fox) on a red and blue background. Worn by military policemen (law enforcers) in the southern command.

== Vehicles ==
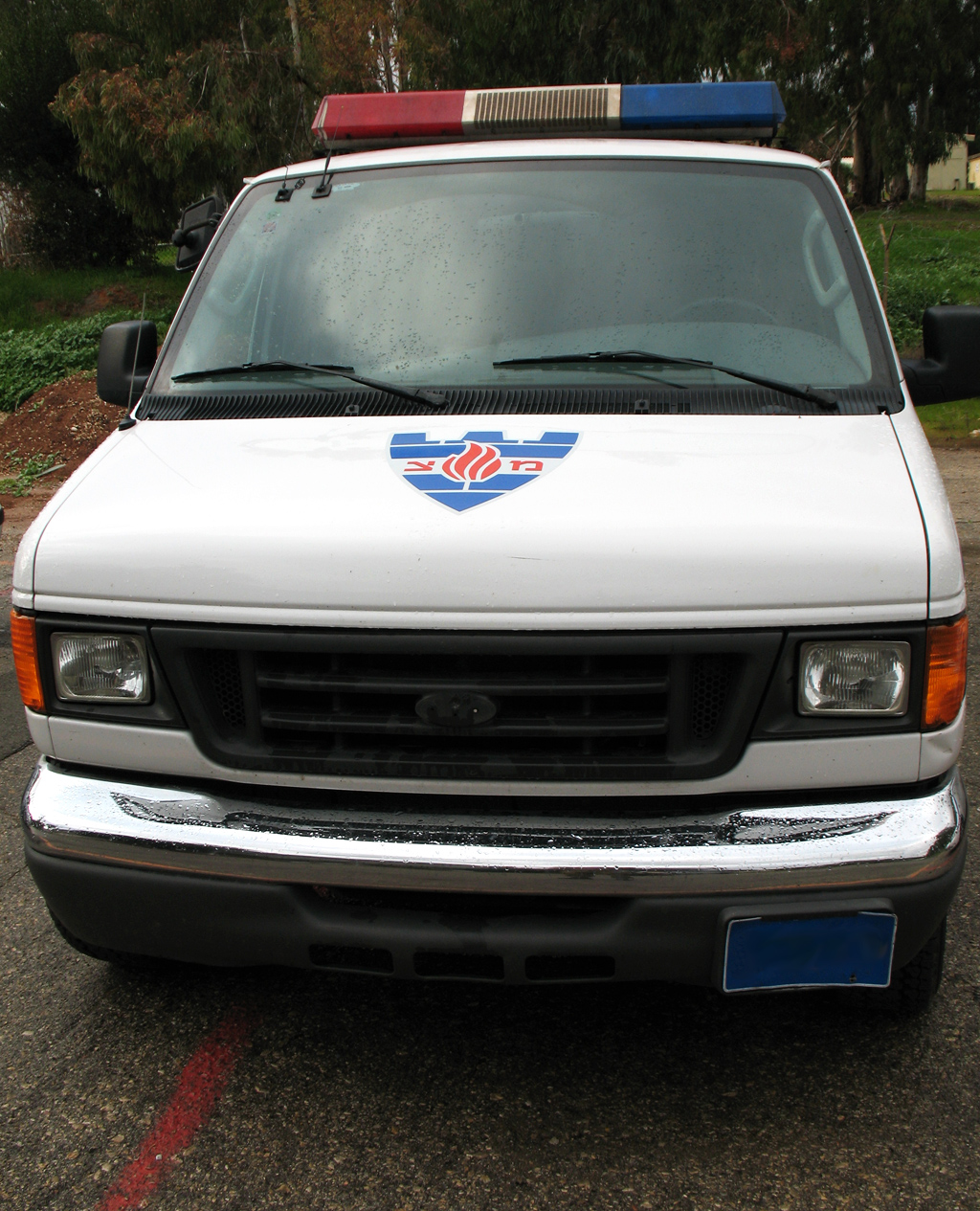
Ford E350 "Econoline"

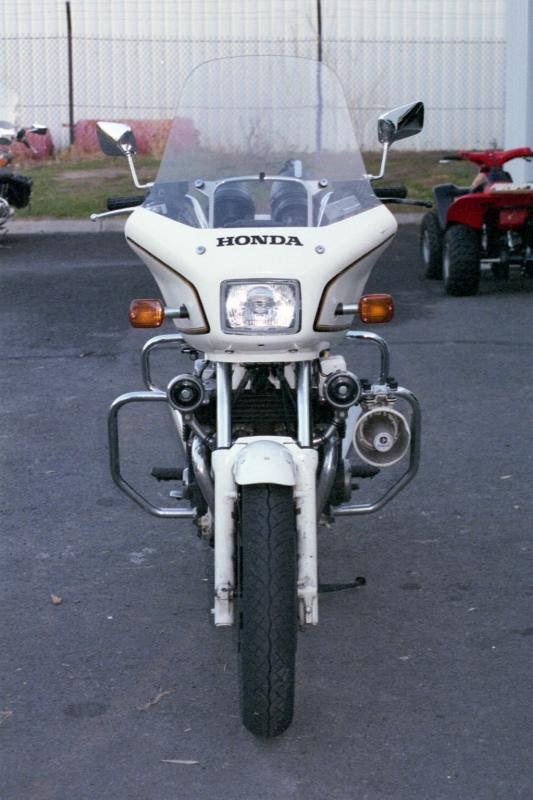
Honda CBX750P (Police)

During the initial stages of the corps' founding, most of the vehicles therein were reconstructed from scrapped British vehicles, and served various purposes. More vehicles were eventually brought to the Israel Defense Forces, and the military police started using several main types of vehicles: patrol cars and motorcycles, vans for faster transit of personnel, as well as limited prisoner transfer, and prisoner transfer trucks and buses. Leased vehicles without army markings are used for covert missions. Following is a list of vehicles used by the corps as of 2008.

=== Patrol cars ===
- Daihatsu Applause, not used anymore
- Renault Mégane, not used anymore
- Chevrolet Optra, not used anymore
- Subaru B4, not used anymore
- Ford Mondeo, not used anymore
- Kia Rio 2012, not used anymore
- Hyundai i35 Elantra 2013 (used by the Yamlat unit only)
- Hyundai i25 2017
- Kia Ceed Sportswagon 2018

=== Motorcycles ===
- Moto-Guzzi V50 with a longitudinally mounted 90° V-twin engine (500), not used anymore.
- BMW R80 with a 2-cylinder boxer engine (800), not used anymore.
- Honda CBX750 with an In-line 4-cylinder engine (750), not used anymore.
- Harley Davidson Sportster with an Evolution engine (883)

=== General-purpose vans ===
- Ford Transit
- Ford E350 "Econoline"
- Chevrolet Savana

=== Prisoner transfer ===
- International DT 466
- International RE Series bus

== Units and bases ==
=== Regional units ===
The following units are part of the corps, but are only professionally subordinate to the Chief Military Police Officers's headquarters. Instead, they are under the jurisdiction of the regional Alufim (chiefs of the northern, central and southern commands). The units are headed by officers ranked lieutenant colonel, and deal mainly with law enforcement and the arrest of AWOLs, but also employ small detention centers for Israeli and (in the case of the central command) also Palestinian prisoners. Each unit is divided into several bases: its headquarters, and territorial MP stations spread out across the country.

The military police base at the General Staff (Matkal) base (Camp Rabin/HaKirya) in Tel Aviv is also only professionally subordinate to the corps's headquarters, and directly serves the commander of Camp Rabin, ranked colonel.

==== Northern command ====
- Northern Command (390) headquarters
- Military Police Golan Heights (Camp Filon), Golan Heights
- Military Police Haifa (Camp Jalame), Haifa

==== Central command ====
- Central Command (391) headquarters (Camp Anatot), near Jerusalem
- Military Police Dan (Camp Yaakov Dori), Tel HaShomer
- Military Police Jerusalem, Judea and Samaria (Camp Anatot), near Jerusalem
- Military Police Yoav (Camp Bar Lev), near Kiryat Mal'akhi

==== Southern command ====
- Southern Command (392) headquarters (Camp Teyman)
- Military Police Ashel (Camp Teyman)
- Military Police Negev (Camp Ariel Sharon), near Beersheba
- Military Police Eilat (Camp Yotam), near Eilat

=== Units subordinate to the corps commander ===
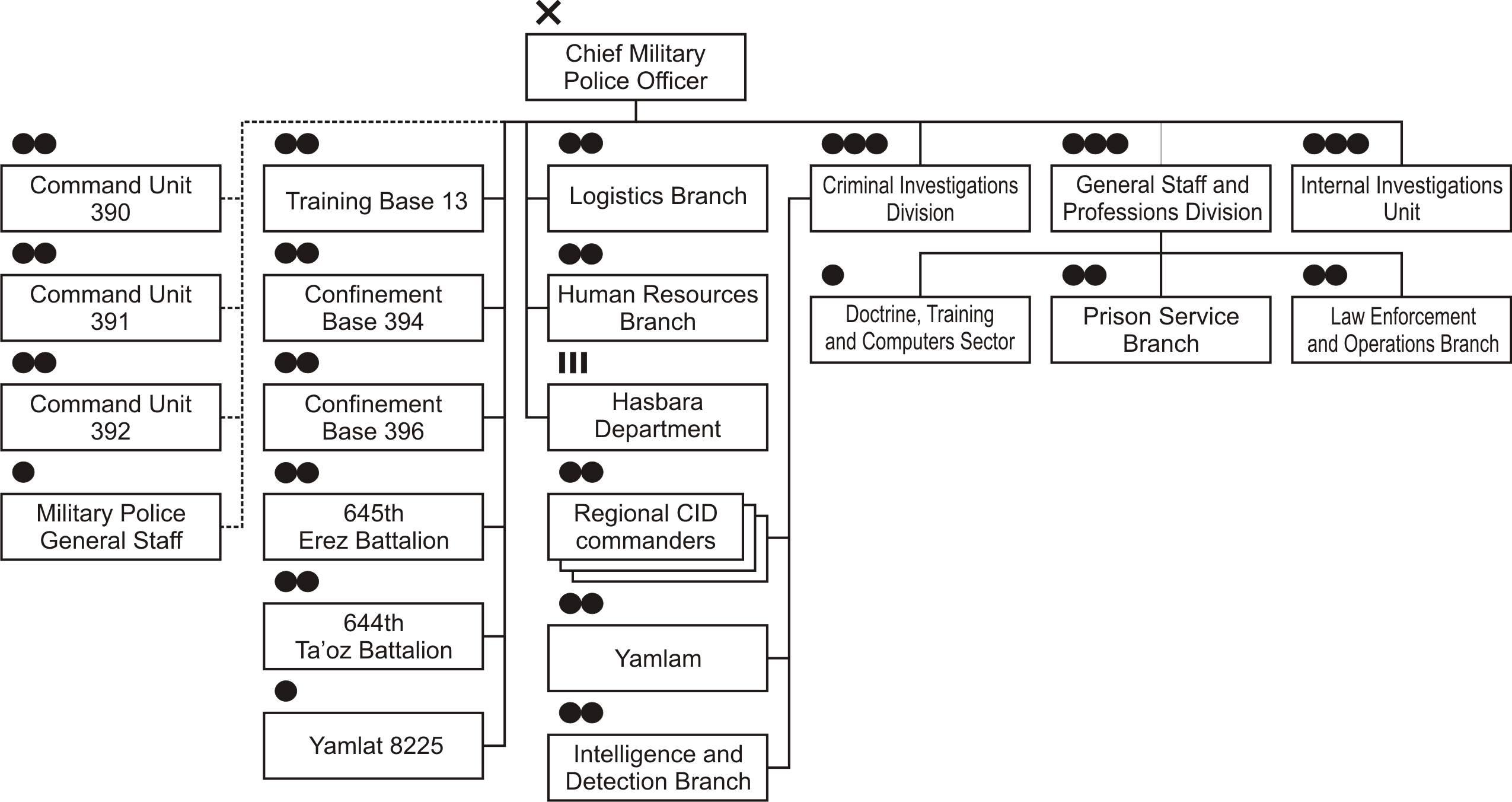
Structure of the Military Police Headquarters

The following units are headed by lieutenant colonels (except the Yamlat, which is under a major), who are in turn directly subordinate to the Chief Military Police Officer.

- Prison Four – Confinement Base 394 (Camp Yadin), Tzrifin (prison sector)
- Prison Six – Confinement Base 396, Atlit (prison sector)
- Erez Battalion (security examination sector)
- Ta'oz Battalion (security examination sector)
- Bahad 13 (Camp Ariel Sharon), near Beersheba (training base)
- Yamlat 8225 (Camp Mota Gur), Kfar Yona (law enforcement sector)

=== Corps headquarters ===
The Chief Military Police Officer's headquarters (Hebrew: מפקדת קצין משטרה צבאית ראשי, Mifkedet Ktzin Mishtara Tzva'it Rashi, abbr. Mekamtzar, a.k.a. Unit 171) is located in Camp Ya'akov Dori (Tel HaShomer). Aside from the aforementioned units directly subordinate to it, there are a number of units within the headquarters, which mainly oversee the professional side of the corps.

There are 2 main brigade-level military police units in the headquarters (the Operations Division and the Criminal Investigations Division (CID)) and a number of staff units common to most corps. The Criminal Investigations Division is both a professional and operation unit, while the Operations Division is a professional guiding unit. The internal investigations unit, headed by a lieutenant, is also directly subordinate to the Chief Military Police Officer.

==== Staff units ====
Following are the staff units present in most IDF corps which are also present in the military police corps' headquarters (the commander's rank is in parentheses):

- Human resources branch (major)
- Computers sector (major)
- Communications sector (major)
- Logistics sector (major)
- Hasbara department (major)

==== Operations Division ====
The Operations Division is headed by a colonel and comprises 3 main branches, which are further divided into specialized departments (the commander's rank is in parentheses):

- Law enforcement and operations branch (lieutenant colonel)
  - Law enforcement and traffic department (major)
  - Security examination department
  - Crime department
  - Deserters department (lieutenant)
  - Military police operations room
- Prison service branch (lieutenant colonel)
  - Confinement bases department (major)
  - Detainees department
  - Prison sector headquarters/operations room
- Doctrine, training and computers sector (major)

=== CID (Metzach) ===
The Criminal Investigations Division is a single unit (Unit 6015), both professional and operational, subordinate to the Chief Military Police Officer. Under the CID however, there are regional sub-units, similar to the regional units of the law enforcement sector, which are further divided into territorial stations, often in close proximity to the corresponding law enforcement bases.

Northern Command

- Metzah Biranit (91st Division), Biranit
- Metzah Haifa (Camp Jalame), Haifa
- Metzah North Headquarters, Haifa
- Metzah Ramat HaGolan (Camp Filon), Golan Heights

Central Command

- Metzah Center Headquarters (Camp Yadin), Tzrifin
  - Central Unit (Hebrew: ימ"ר מרכז, Yamar Merkaz)
  - Central Traffic Accidents Unit
- Metzah Dan (Camp Yadin), Tzrifin
- Metzah Jerusalem (Camp Anatot), Jerusalem
- Metzah Sharon VeShomron (Camp Mota Gur), Kfar Yona
- Metzah Yoav (Camp Bar-Lev), near Qiryat Mal'akhi

Southern Command

- Metzah Arava (Ovda Airforce Base), Arava
- Metzah Be'er Sheva (Camp Nathan), Be'er Sheva
- Metzah South Headquarters (Camp Nathan), Be'er Sheva
- Metzah Urim, near Ofaqim

Central Unit for Special Investigations

- Yamlam, Green House (Jaffa)

=== Former bases ===
==== Training ====
Bahad 13, which was founded in Tzrifin in 1954, was moved to a base near Kedumim and Nablus in 1969, and later moved again to Camp Mota Gur near Kfar Yona in 1995.

==== Law enforcement ====
Like today, 3 law enforcement stations existed in the Northern Command unit (390) of the military police. In the beginning 2000s, it was decided to move all 3 of these bases into larger ones for economic reasons:

- Military Police Gadot, near kibbutz Gadot – moved to Camp Filon (MP Golan Heights)
- Military Police Nesher, near Nesher – moved to Camp Jalame (MP Haifa)
- Military Police Tiberias, near Tiberias – moved to Camp Shimshon (MP HaAmakim)

Following Operation Peace for Galilee, the corps also set up bases in Lebanon along with other Israeli Security Forces units. A base existed in Tyre and Sidon, each.

Prior to 1980, a military police base was located in Tel Aviv and was responsible for the area, and another one in Tzrifin. During that year, when the Yamlat was founded, the Tel Aviv base was deemed no longer necessary. It was moved to Tel HaShomer and renamed Military Police Dan. The Yamlat unit replaced the old base in Tzrifin as a law enforcement unit, while other designations (such as the base's detention center) were taken up by the central command unit's headquarters on the same site.

The unit's headquarters, which were formerly in Military Police Tzrifin, were moved to Camp Anatot between 2004 and 2007, a relatively new base between Jerusalem and Ma'ale Adummim. The creation of Anatot also saw the relocation thereto of Military Police Jerusalem, previously located in Camp Schneller in the city proper.

Another base in the central command was located in the Jordan valley, called Military Police Jordan. It was dismantled due to lack of necessity.

Prior to the corps's re-organization following the Oslo Accords, a military police base existed in the Gaza Strip, called Military Police Gaza. It was dismantled as part of the handing over of the strip to the Palestinian Authority, and split into Military Police Urim and Military Police Erez. MP Erez was later merged with the Sirpad combat unit and moved to a new base (see next section).

==== Combat units ====
Following the Oslo Accords and the tensions between the Jewish and Palestinian civilian populations in the Palestinian Territories, three combat companies were founded in the military police, which kept the order in the Jewish settlements. Sahlav (lit. orchid, a.k.a. 60th MP Company) and Sayfan (lit. gladiolus), which were subordinate to the central command unit (391), were located in the Hebron area and the Binyamin area, respectively. The third company, Sirpad (lit. nettle), was founded on the principle of the first two, and was subordinate to the southern command unit (392). It was located in the Gaza Division's base, but later relocated to Nisanit (Gaza Strip), after a merged with Military Police Erez.

As the tensions between Jews and Arabs in the Palestinian Territories increased, these companies started to make arrests and conveyance of Palestinians, contrary to their original designations. As a result, following the onset of the Second Intifada, Sayfan and Sirpad were disbanded due to the lack of operational necessity (many of their missions were taken up by the Ofer and Ktzi'ot prisons, and the Israel Border Police), while Sahlav continued working until December 2005. The Sahlav company was the first IDF unit to provide combat training for female soldiers, long before the Caracal Battalion and similar units were founded.

== Leadership ==
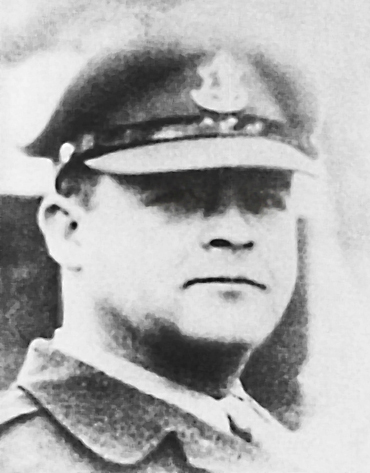
Lieut. Col. Danny Magen, the first corps commander

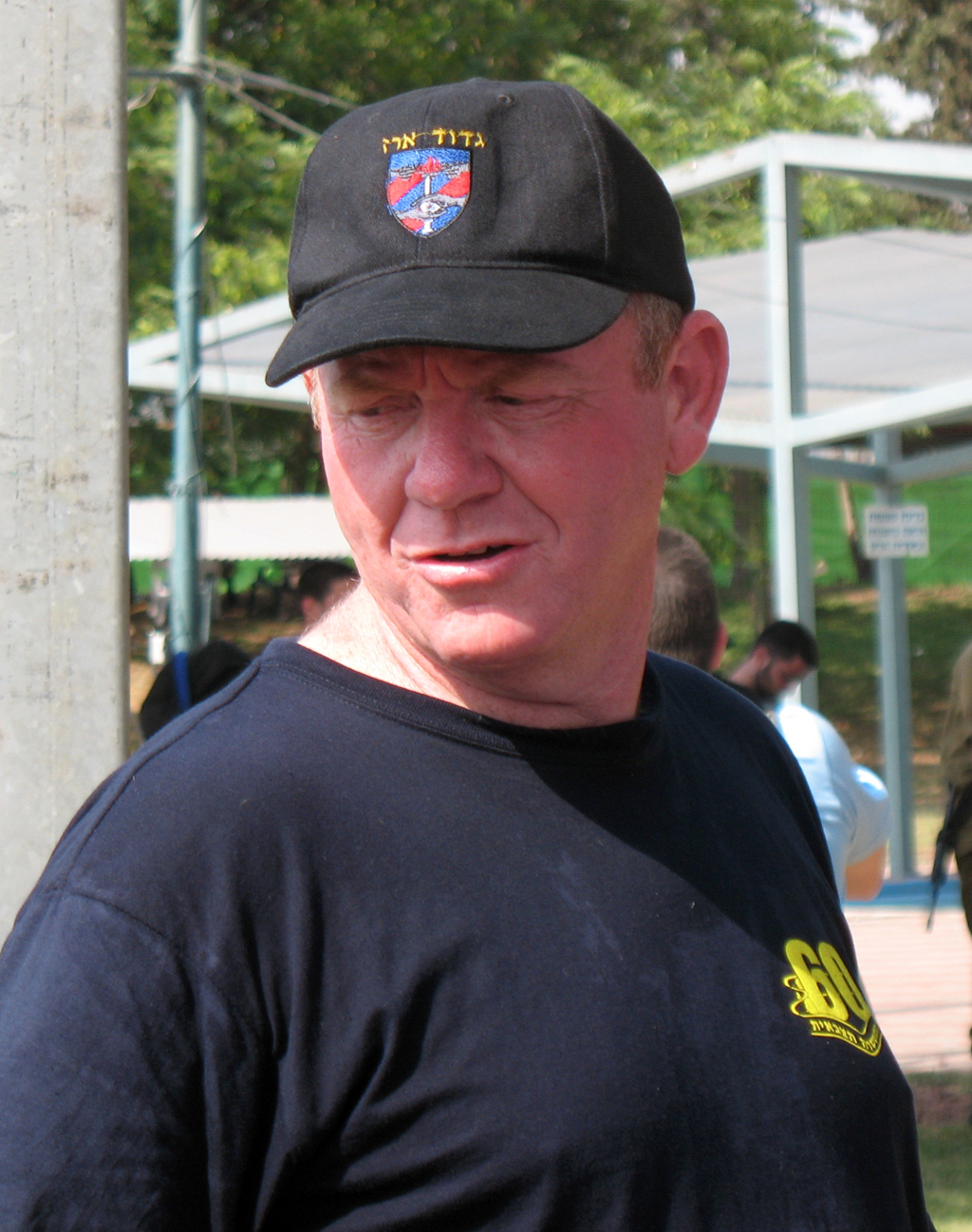
Brig. Gen. Ronny Benny, head of the corps 2005–2009

The Military Police Corps is headed by the Chief Military Police Officer (Hebrew: קצין משטרה צבאית ראשי, Ktzin Mishtara Tzva'it Rashi, abbr. Kamtzar), a title similar to the UK/US Provost Marshal. The CMPO and most of the other military police leadership operate in the Mekamtzar (Chief Military Police Officer Headquarters).

The Chief Military Police Officer position was established in 1950 and a rank of colonel designated to it. The first official holder of the position was Yosef Pressman. In 1974, the rank of brigadier general was designated to the position, and then Chief MP Officer Colonel Zalman Vardi was promoted to this rank.

=== List of Chief Military Police Officers ===
Rank	Name	Years	Accomplishments and events during tenure
Lieutenant Colonel	Danny Magen	1948 – May 1950	Founding of the corps, 1948 Arab-Israeli War, founding of Prison Four
Colonel	Yosef Pressman	May 1950 – May 1951	
Colonel	Baruch Yitzhar	May 1951 – October 1954	
Colonel	Tzvi-Shimshon Shafir	October 1954 – September 1960	Suez Crisis, founding of Prison Six
Colonel later Maj. Gen.	Raphael Vardi	September 1960 – August 1962	
Colonel	Israel Karmi	August 1962 – September 1971	Six-Day War, War of Attrition
Brigadier General	Zalman Vardi	September 1971 – April 1976	Yom Kippur War
Brigadier General	Benjamin Inbar	April 1976 – October 1977	
Brigadier General	Baruch Arbel	October 1977 – September 1980	
Brigadier General	Haim Granit	September 1980 – April 1982	
Brigadier General	Meir Geva	April 1982 – August 1985	First Lebanon War
Brigadier General	Amir Elimelekh	August 1985 – March 1989	First Intifada
Brigadier General	Shalom Ben Moshe	March 1989 – November 22, 1991	Gulf War, changes in MP appearance and removal of the white helmet
Brigadier General	Mordechai Biran	November 22, 1991 – March 16, 1995	Oslo Accords
Brigadier General	Nir-Am Goldbroom	March 16, 1995 – July 30, 1998	
Brigadier General	Yoram Tzahor	July 30, 1998 – 2002	Second Intifada
Brigadier General	Miki Bar'el	2002 – September 15, 2005	Operation Blue-White, Israel's unilateral disengagement plan
Brigadier General	Ronny Benny	September 15, 2005 – September 10, 2009	Transfer of Megiddo, Ktzi'ot and Ofer prisons to the IPS
Brigadier General	Meir Ohana	September 10, 2009 – 2013	
Brigadier General	Golan Maimon	2013 – September 8, 2016	Operation Protective Edge, transfer of Bahad 13 to the City of Training Bases
Brigadier General	Ran Kochav	September 8, 2016 – August 8, 2018	
Brigadier General	Yair Bareket	August 8, 2018 – July 26, 2021	
Brigadier General	Avichai Maibar	July 26, 2021 – June 2025	
Brigadier General	Yuval Ya'amin	June 2025 – present	

== Notable military policemen ==
Below is a list of notable Israelis in non-military fields who served in the Military Police Corps.

- Yityish Titi Aynaw, model, Miss Israel 2013
- Assi Azar, television host
- Liraz Dror, model
- Nadav Hanefeld, basketball player
- Rami Hoiberger, actor and comedian
- Zion Marili, football player
- Shimon Mizrahi, the chairman of Maccabi Tel Aviv Basketball Club
- Hila Nahshon, television hostess and model
- Amir Ohana, activist, politician and Knesset member
- Avraham Poraz, politician, Knesset member and government minister
- Yona Yahav, politician and Knesset member; mayor of Haifa since 2003
