= Prison Four =

Military prison

Coordinates: 31.9594°N 34.8282°E

Unit tag of Prison Four

Prison Four (Hebrew: כלא ארבע, Kele Arba), officially Confinement Base 394 (Hebrew: בסיס כליאה 394, Bsis Kli'a 394) was an Israeli military prison for Israeli soldiers, located in the military police compound in Tzrifin (Camp Yadin), Israel.

It was the main prison for military prisoners in Israel (the secondary being Prison Six) and could contain approximately 600 prisoners. It was the only prison for Israeli soldiers during an emergency. Prison Four accepted all prisoners except officers, senior NCOs, some military policemen and soldiers who serve in the Northern Command. These go to Prison Six.

Both prisons were closed in 2021 and the prisoners were transferred to the new Neve Tzedek military prison within the Gur Camp complex near Kfar Yona.

== History ==
Prison Four was founded soon after the 1948 Arab-Israeli War and absorbed prisoners from a provisional jail previously set up in northern Tel Aviv (al-Shaykh Muwannis). It suffered neglect and overcrowding from the onset, and in 1949 a commission of inquiry was ordered by the IDF Chief of Staff, led by Aluf Moshe Zadok and Aluf David Shaltiel. Prison Six was eventually founded as a result of Prison Four's extreme overcrowding.

Ever since, Prison Four has gradually undergone major changes. The prison was the first to experiment with new ideas in the prison sector, such as the operation of security cameras in key locations, as well as a rehabilitation program called Gahelet (lit. factors for returning to proper service) in 2000. In 2006, prisoners' valuables were stolen from the prison's safe, and in January 2008 a prisoner died for the first time in the history of the jail, although the exact circumstances of his death remain unclear. Both events caused the high command of the Military Police Corps to rethink their approach to the prison system and install new safeguards.

=== Syrian prisoner escape ===
After the Six-Day War, high-status Arab prisoners of war were kept in regular Israeli military prisons, including Prison Four. They were given excellent living conditions, including television, more access to possessions, and trips to the outside, in order to ensure that the Israeli POWs held in Egypt and Syria would get similar treatment.

On April 16, 1972, three Syrian prisoners were found missing in a morning roll call and were later confirmed to be escapees. After the initial investigation, the commander of the Manpower Directorate, Aluf Shlomo Lahat, ordered a revocation of all special privileges to POWs held in Prison Four. The deputy Chief Military Police Officer, Colonel Meir Rosenfeld, was responsible for the task, and as a first step informed a cell of Egyptians that their television sets would be removed. The Egyptians asked for two hours to formulate a means to have all the prisoners give up their TVs, meanwhile planning a riot. They began fortifying their cells and damaging the weak ceilings. After this became clear to the jailors, an intervention team was formed, although Col. Rosenfeld did not wish to have a violent clash which would endanger either Egyptian or Israeli lives. Rosenfeld personally climbed the roof of the cellblock and fired a bursts around him to scare the Egyptians. One bullet ricocheted and wounded an Egyptian prisoner. The others promptly surrendered and the injured prisoner died from his wounds.

While the Chief of Staff David Elazar, who arrived at the scene, praised Rosenfeld for his actions, an investigating committee found that he used his weapon illegally. As a result, Megiddo Prison was founded in 1974 to hold certain prisoners of war, as well as problematic Israeli military prisoners.

== Structure ==
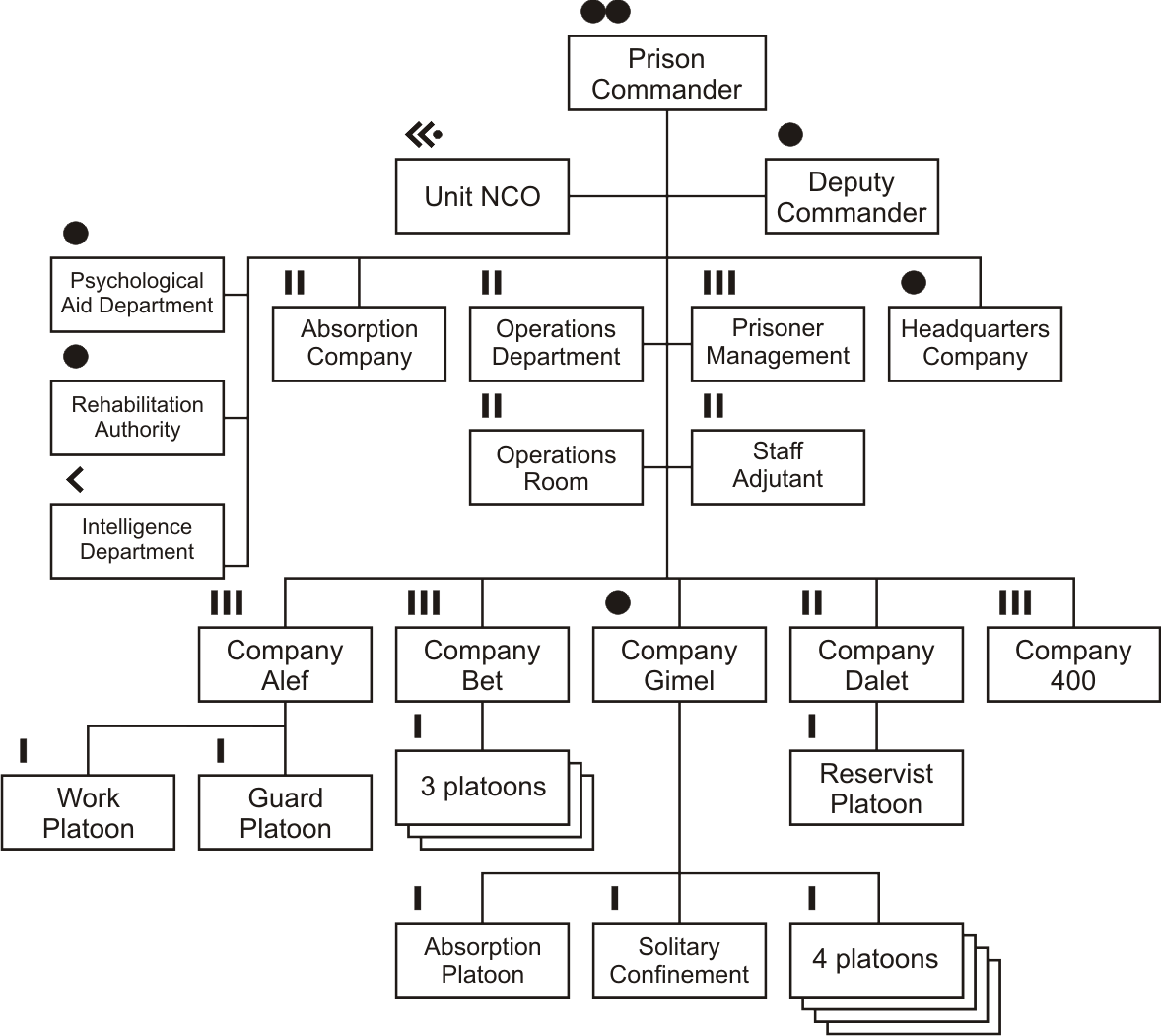
Prison Four's full structure chart

There were six companies in Prison Four and several other assisting sub-units:

- Absorption Company - accepts new prisoners and sometimes temporarily holds them before they can be transferred to a permanent company. Formerly this company was located outside the prison and had accommodations for prisoners, but this was changed following the mass deposit robbery of 2006. Headed by a lieutenant.
- Company Alef (א) - for prisoners serving sentences of 28 days or less, or those who have less than 28 days till their release. This is an open company, i.e. prisoners sleep in an open (but guarded) area, and not in jail cells. Headed by a captain and can contain up to 120 prisoners.
- Company Bet (ב) - for long-time convicts, usually with sentences above 100 days. Company Bet is known for its harsh living conditions.
- Company Gimel was a closed company for detainees awaiting trial, new prisoners, and some serving medium sentences. It consists of four regular platoons and a fifth absorption platoon, where new prisoners are accepted and sorted. Gimel is the largest company, containing up to 180 prisoners, and its commander is a major instead of a captain.
- Company Dalet was an open company and the least strict of any of the other companies. While technically intended for reservists, there are two other classes of soldiers who may serve their sentences there. Soldiers aged 22 and above may request placement in Company Dalet, as may soldiers serving in the Nahal Haredi, a battalion made up of Haredi soldiers. The reason for the latter group of soldiers is that women do not serve as jail instructors in Company Dalet, thereby minimizing the Haredi soldiers' exposure to women.
- Company 400 - formerly a separate prison, company 400 is the women's company, and contains all female prisoners.

=== Assisting units ===
- Prisoner management unit - served as the adjutant unit for prisoners only.
- Adjutant unit - served as the adjutant unit for regular soldiers serving in Prison Four.
- Operations sector.
- Operations room.
- Mental health sector - provided psychological help for prisoners. Headed by a major.
- Gahelet sector - a sector introduced in 2000, which helped prisoners resume normal service. This sector was operated mostly by female soldiers who pick the soldiers they want to help, instead of the soldier asking for help as with other sectors.
- Intelligence sector - responsible for collecting intelligence about possible rebellions, etc. Headed by a first sergeant (called an intelligence officer).

== See also ==
- Israeli military prison
- Military Police Corps (Israel)
- Prison Six
