= Tzrifin =

City in Israel

Coordinates: 31°57′31.25″N 34°50′22.33″E

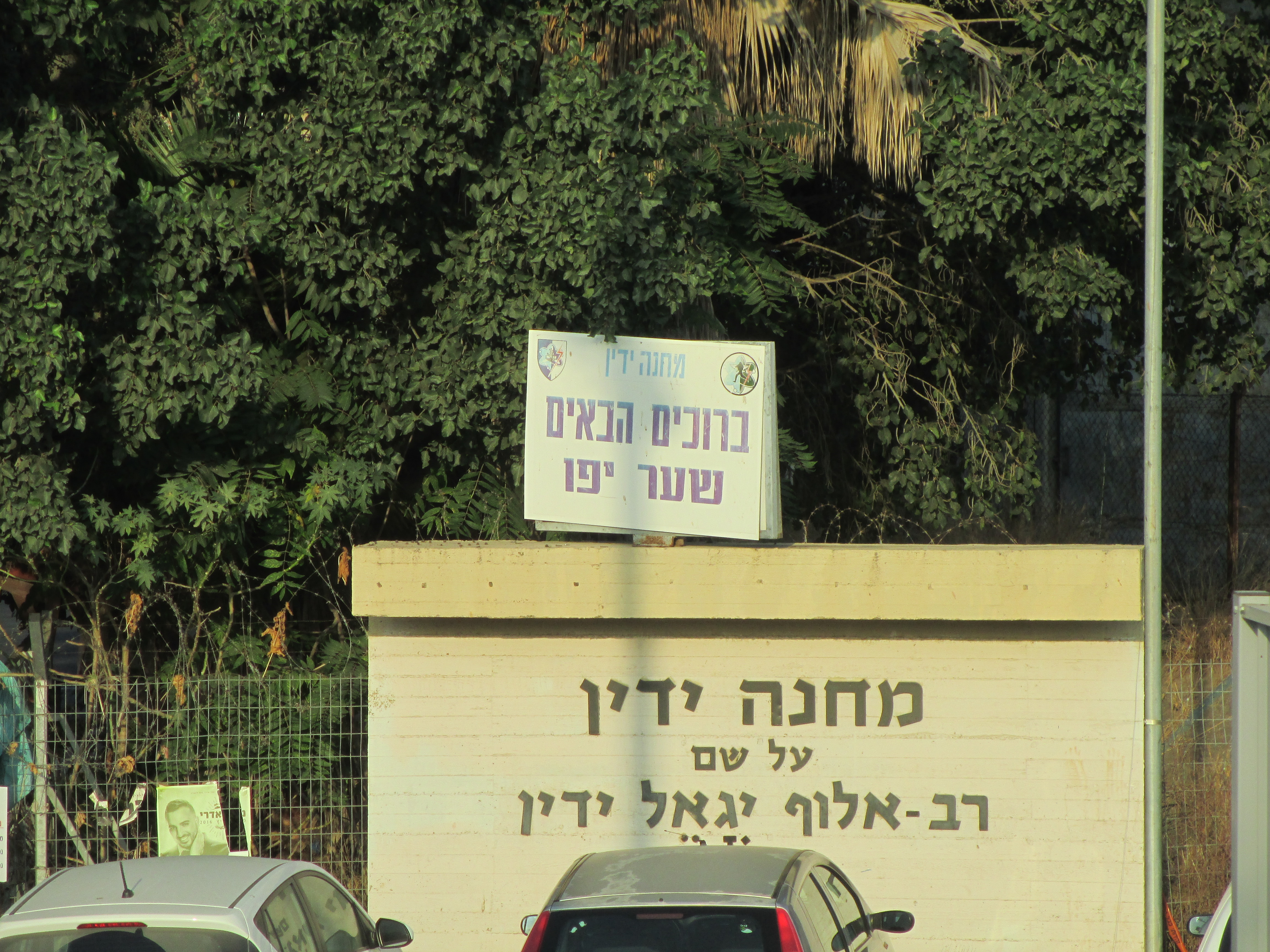
Jaffa gate of Tzrifin

Tzrifin (Hebrew: צְרִיפִין) is an area in Gush Dan (Dan Region) in central Israel, located on the eastern side of Rishon LeZion and including parts of Be'er Ya'akov. The area proper is defined as an 'area without jurisdiction' between the two cities.

Nearly the entire area of Tzrifin proper was taken up by the central Israel Defense Forces (IDF) base, Camp Yigael Yadin (a.k.a. Camp Tzrifin, Camp 782), with which it is synonymous, even though the base also spills into Rishon LeZion and Be'er Ya'akov. Camp Yadin contains a multitude of training bases, as well as Prison Four, the largest Israeli military prison.

In late 2010s it was decided to vacate the area, move its bases to Camp Ariel Sharon in the South and repurpose the land for residential development.

== Etymology ==
Tzrifin (צריפין) is an ancient Aramaic place-name, meaning "huts". From this place-name came the name of the Arabic village Ṣarafand al-Amar.

== History ==
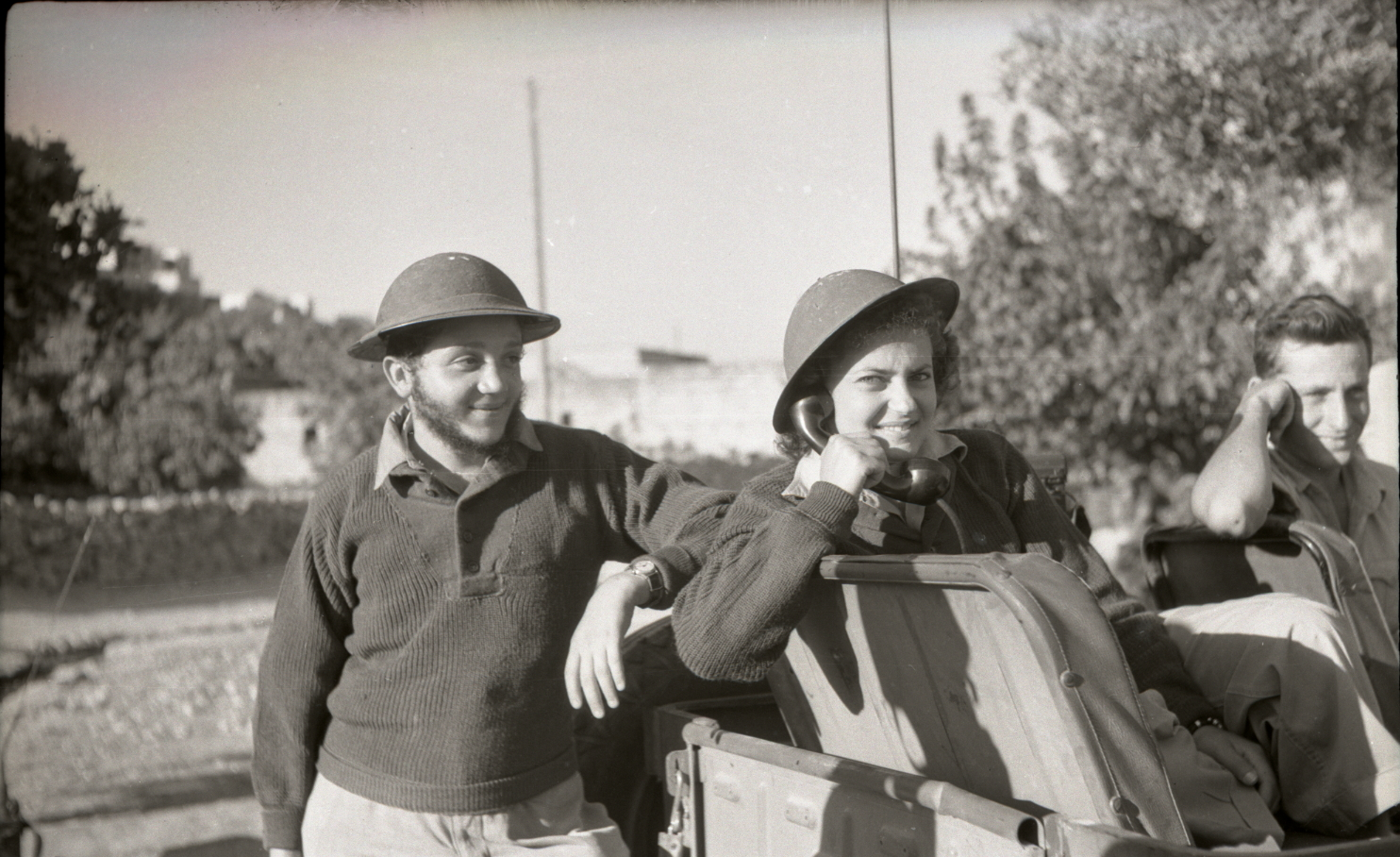
Sarafand, 19 May 1948

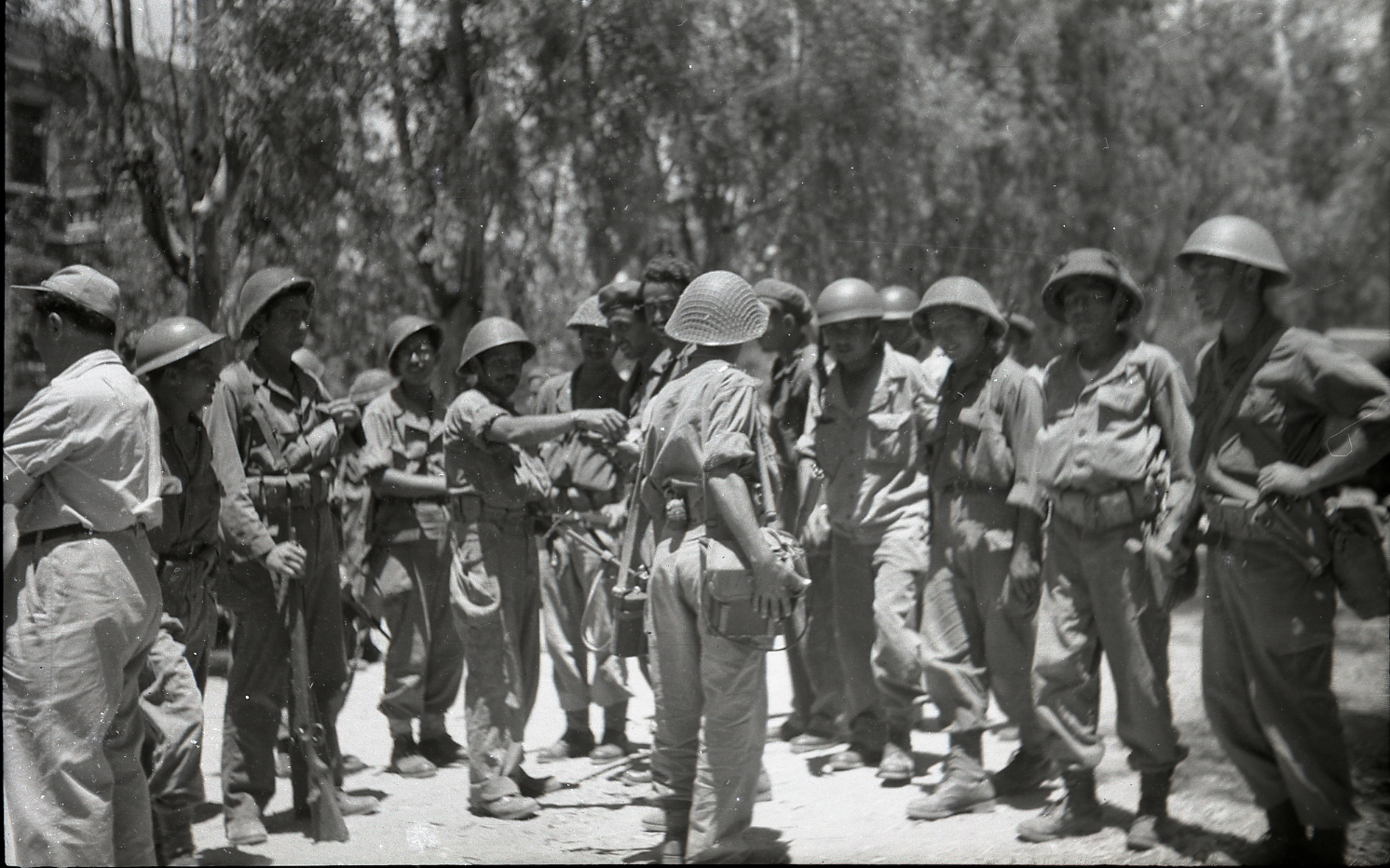
Sarafand, 19 May 1948

During the 18th and 19th centuries, the area of Tzrifin belonged to the Nahiyeh (sub-district) of Lod that encompassed the area of the present-day city of Modi'in-Maccabim-Re'ut in the south to the present-day city of El'ad in the north, and from the foothills in the east, through the Lod Valley to the outskirts of Jaffa in the west. This area was home to thousands of inhabitants in about 20 villages, who had at their disposal tens of thousands of hectares of prime agricultural land.

Tzrifin was founded in 1917, during World War I, as a British base named Sarafand or Sarafend, after the nearby Arab village Sarafand al-Amar. On 10 December 1918 Arab and Bedouin men were killed systematically by Anzac troops in the Surafend massacre. Sarafand was a central British base in a strategic location situated nearby the important railway junction at Lydda (Lod) – which was accessible from the base via a spur off of the Jaffa–Lydda–Jerusalem railway. The Transjordan Frontier Force (TJFF) was established at Sarafand on 1 April 1926 with a cadre drawn from the Arab Legion. The TJFF subsequently moved to Zerqa in October 1926. During World War II, the Jewish Brigade was formed in Tzrifin.

Starting in the 1930s, next to the military camp there was a concentration camp for Arab and Jewish Palestinian convicts in administrative detention, and for Jewish illegal immigrants.

On 14 May 1948, the day of the Israeli declaration of independence, British forces vacated Sarafand. False rumours suggested the British sold the base to the Arabs, but only Arab residents of nearby villages, some of whom worked in the base, entered the base for looting. The adjacent Arab village Sarafand al-'Amr was depopulated on 15 May. After a two-day battle, between the 18th and 19 May, the base was captured by the Jewish forces from the Givati Brigade. The place was named Tzrifin after a historical city with that name located in the area and mentioned in the Talmud.

As the years passed, Rishon LeZion expanded to the east, eventually reaching the fence line of Camp Yadin. As a result, the IDF decided to vacate Tzrifin and sell its land to private residential developers due to the high land value. By the early 2020s the IDF is expected to vacate all of its installations from Tzrifin, with most of their functions being relocated to new bases to Camp Ariel Sharon in the Negev desert, Southern Israel. In 2019 the central part of the camp was demolished to give way for 1,100 new apartments for Rishon LeZion.

== Location and geography ==
Tzrifin is located between Rishon LeZion on the west, and Be'er Ya'akov on all 3 other sides. It is 72 m (236 ft) above sea level and 15 km (9.3 mi) from the Mediterranean seashore. The base in it has three main entrances—Jaffa Gate, Jerusalem Gate and Rishon LeZion Gate, all of which are located within the municipalities, and not within Tzrifin proper.

The Jaffa Gate links a street within the base to Road 44 (Tzrifin Junction). At this location, there are a number of fast food restaurants and a pedestrian bridge which connects the base to the bus terminal on the other side of the road. The Assaf HaRofeh Medical Center is located near the Jaffa Gate.

The Jerusalem Gate links the base to Tzahal Road (Road 4313) in Be'er Ya'akov, which ultimately connects to Road 44 at the Nir Tzvi Junction in the Emek Lod Regional Council. The Rishon LeZion gate is located deep within Rishon LeZion and connects Rishon's Jerusalem Street with the base.

== Bases ==
As with many other IDF bases, Camp Yadin is a container base for many smaller ones. The following is a list of bases within Camp Yadin.

=== Training bases ===
- Bahad 6 – the school for logistics
- Bahad 7 – the school for telecommunications and computers - technically located outside Camp Yadin
- Bahad 10 – the school for medical professions
- Bahad 11 – the Human Resources Directorate training base (Adjutant Corps, General Corps)
- Bahad 12 – the school for command, belonging to the GOC Army Headquarters (now closed)
- Bahad 16 – the school for extraction and rescue
- Bahad 20 – the school for the Ordnance Corps
- The school for military law and the disciplinary court department
- The school for governing

=== Other bases (partial links) ===
- 108th Air Force Unit and Erez Workshop
- Military Police Corps area, including Prison Four (Unit 394), Yamlat 8225, CID Dan and Yamar Center
- Lotem telecommunications unit (Unit 818)
- 779th Military Rabbinate Unit (Beth din)
- 542nd Medical Corps Unit
- Anti-WMD Base B
- 276th Anti-WMD Center
- Military court for off-duty days
- Food supply center (Units 6100, 6110 and 6120)
- 562nd and 564th building and maintenance units
- Combat Equipment and Spare Parts Center (Matzlah) (Unit 6800)
- Hoshen Center (Unit 868)
- Maintenance and Rehabilitation Center (Unit 7000)
- 791st Workshop

== Non-military use ==
During the 1950s, a Ma'abara was located on the lands of Tzrifin, the residents of which eventually moved out to the nearby towns, especially Lod.

Currently, several non-military installations are located in the Tzrifin area:

- Assaf HaRofeh Medical Center, which provides care for both military and civilian patients
- Shmuel HaRofe Geriatric Hospital
- Warehouses belonging to the Jewish Agency for Israel
- Various industrial complexes

== Military evacuation and civilian development ==
The Israel Defense Forces is slated to move most bases in Tzrifin in 2013–2014 to the new City of Training Bases being built south of Beersheba. The area of the base will open to civilian development, and will be divided between the municipalities of Rishon LeZion and Be'er Ya'akov. Most of the area, 840 dunams (0.84 km^{2}), will go Rishon LeZion, and much of it will be zoned for commercial development. This will including an industrial zone for medical development, next to the Asaf HaRofe Hospital. Be'er Ya'akov will get 560 dunams (0.56 km^{2}) mostly for residential development.

== Archaeology ==
An archaeological excavation was conducted at Khirbet Tzrifin in 2010 by Ron Toueg on behalf of Israel Antiquities Authority (IAA).

== See also ==
- The train accident in Tzirifin
