= Holot =

Israeli detention center of illegal immigrants in the Negev desert

Holot Detention Center
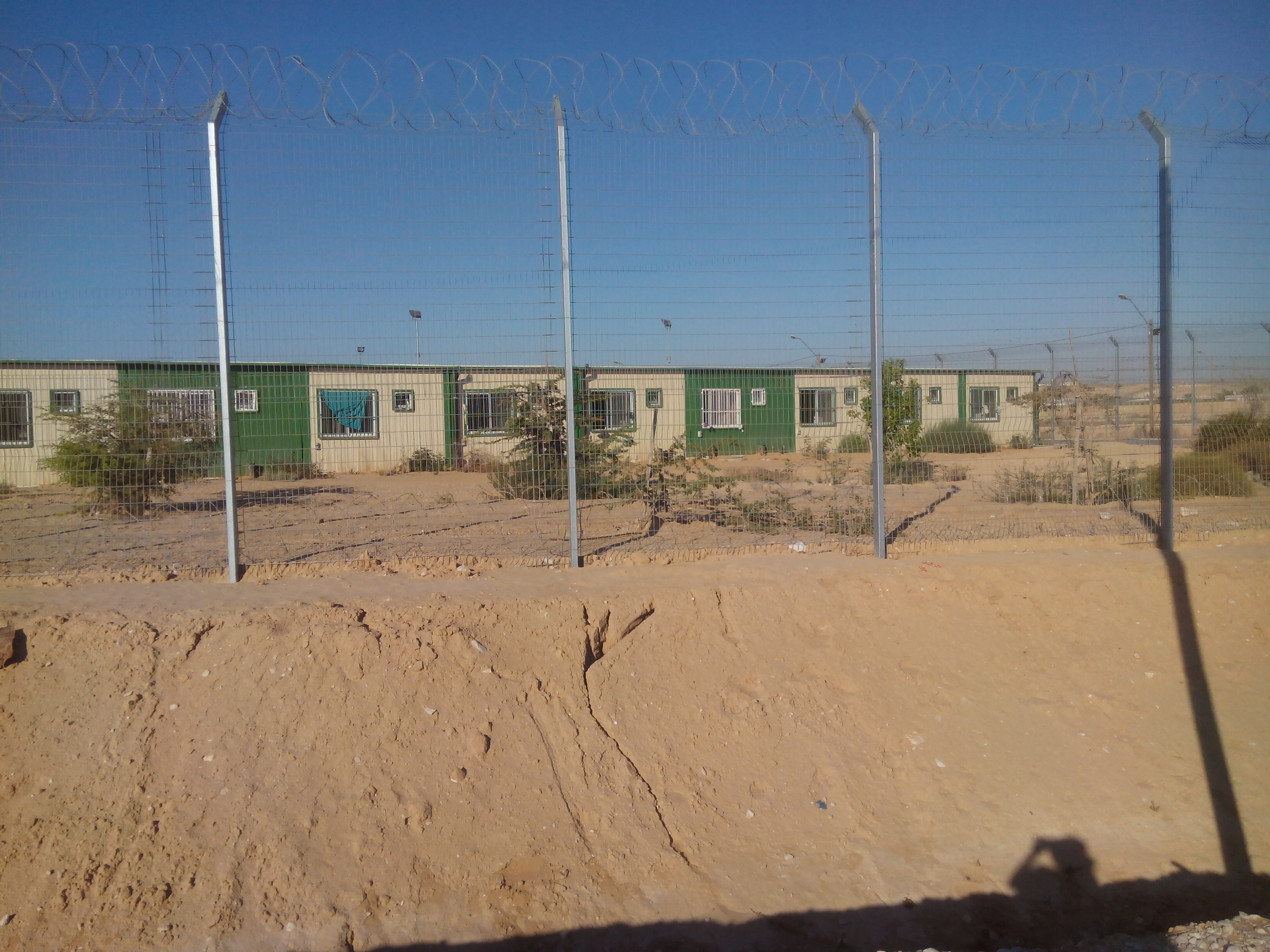

- Location of the prison in Israel
- Location: 30°53′40″N 34°26′45″E
- Population: 0 (2023)
- Opened: 12 December 2013
- Closed: 14 March 2018

The Holot detention center or Holot prison was a facility of the Israel Prison Service established to detain and hold illegal immigrants from Eritrea and Sudan who had been living in Israel after having entered through the Israel-Egypt border prior to the building of the Egypt-Israel barrier in 2013. The facility was opened on December 12, 2013, about two kilometers from the Israel-Egypt border, near Ktzi'ot Prison and Saharonim Prison. As countries are prohibited under international law from expelling asylum-seekers who have already reached another nation, Israel established Holot as a way to coerce them into requesting to be deported from Israel.

The facility included three wings, each of which housed 1,120 inmates, and an administrative wing.

In September 2014, the Supreme Court of Israel ruled that Holot should be closed, on the grounds that it infringed on the human right of "human dignity": “infiltrators do not lose one ounce of their right to human dignity just because they reached the country in this way or another.”

After almost four years, on March 14, 2018, the facility was finally closed.
