= African immigration to Israel =

Movement from Africa to Israel of people that are not natives or Israeli citizens

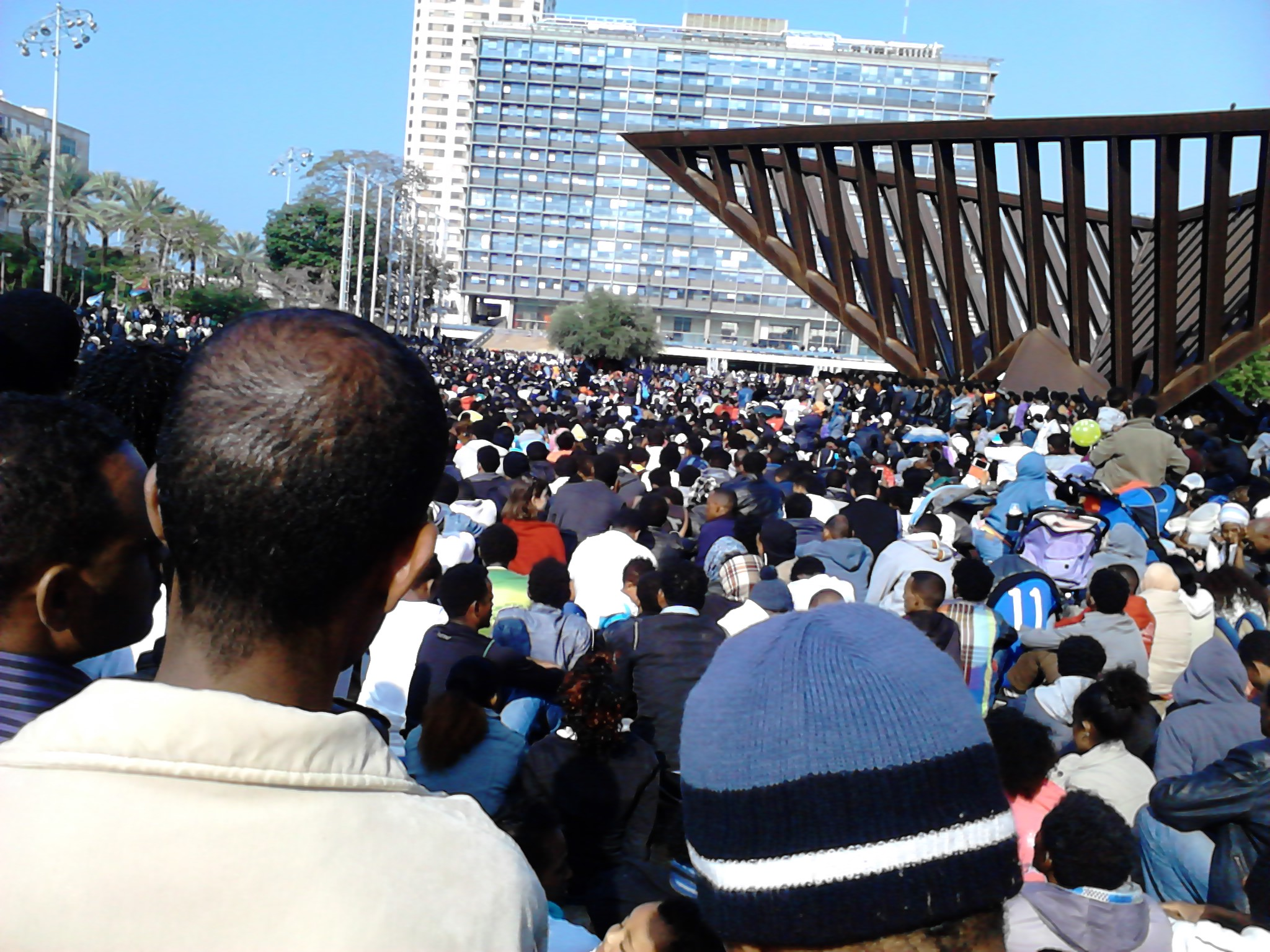
African migrants demonstrating in Tel Aviv

African immigration to Israel is the international movement to Israel from Africa of people who are not natives or do not possess Israeli citizenship in order to settle or reside there. This phenomenon began in the second half of the 2000s, when a large number of people from Africa entered Israel, mainly through the then-lightly fenced border between Israel and Egypt in the Sinai Peninsula. According to the data of the Israeli Interior Ministry, 26,635 people arrived illegally in this way by July 2010, and over 55,000 by January 2012. In an attempt to curb the influx, Israel constructed the Egypt–Israel barrier. Since its completion in December 2013, the barrier has almost completely stopped the immigration of Africans into Israel across the Sinai border.

The African refugee population in Israel is composed primarily of Sudanese and Eritrean refugees migrating to Israel through the Sinai Desert. Israeli policy concerning these refugees has evolved from a policy of neutrality to a policy of deterrence. These refugees began arriving in Israel in the 21st century, led by Bedouin smugglers. As of 2018, the non-Jewish African refugee population in Israel is approximately 36,000.

Israeli citizens living in neighborhoods with large refugee populations have mixed attitudes towards them. Some have claimed refugees are "rapists" and "criminals", while others living in the same neighborhood described them as "peaceful" and "kind." With tensions rising and shifting Israeli policy, both deterrence and support for the refugees has increased. Israeli policy toward African refugees have been heavily influenced by the advocacy and legal work of several nonprofits, including the Hotline for Refugees and Migrants, Kav LaOved, Association for Civil Rights in Israel, and others.

As of January 2018, according to the Population and Immigration Authority (PIBA) there were 37,288 African migrants in Israel, not including children born to migrants in Israel. Most African migrants are regarded to be legitimate asylum seekers by human rights organizations, but the Israeli government says most of them are job seeking work-migrants.

Many of the migrants seek asylum status under the United Nations Convention relating to the Status of Refugees. Citizens of Eritrea and Sudan cannot be forcibly deported from Israel. Under international law, Eritrean citizens (who, since 2009, form the majority of the undocumented workers in Israel) cannot be deported due to the opinion of the United Nations High Commissioner for Refugees (UNHCR) that Eritrea has a difficult internal situation and a forced recruitment and therefore the Eritrean immigrants are defined as a "temporary humanitarian protection group". Israeli authorities have stated that they could not deport Sudanese directly back to Sudan because Israel has no diplomatic ties to Sudan. Accordingly, the Israeli authorities grant temporary residence through "conditional release permits" which must be renewed every one to four months, depending on the discretion of the individual immigration official. Various authorities in Israel estimate that 80–90% of the undocumented workers live primarily in two centers: more than 60% in Tel Aviv and more than 20% Eilat, with a few in Ashdod, Jerusalem and Arad. Most non-Jewish African refugees have been granted "conditional release" visas, which are not valid work permits in Israel. Lack of a valid work permit severely limits their economic opportunities. There was a case of a riot targeting African refugees in Tel Aviv, although the Israeli government has arrested and subsequently punished the perpetrators.

== Legal status ==
According to the government, the majority of the migrants are seeking economic opportunity. This is not the case among Israel's allies such as the United States, where the vast majority of Eritrean and Sudanese applicants are accepted as refugees. Once in Israel, African migrants have sought refugee status for fleeing forced, open-ended conscription in Eritrea or ethnic cleansing in the Darfur region of Sudan, but the government of Israel maintains that these areas merely have a poor human rights record, which does not automatically entitle one to asylum. To qualify, applicants must establish that they face the risk of personal harm or persecution if they return to their country. The Interior Ministry has failed to review the vast majority of asylum requests.

Most migrants request refugee status after arriving in Israel, in accordance with the United Nations's Convention Relating to the Status of Refugees. Israel does not review the status of the individual immigrants originating from Eritrea or Sudan, who constitute about 83% of the total people coming to Israel across the Egyptian border, and instead automatically grants them a "temporary protection group" status. This status allows these people to have temporary residence right within Israel, which must be renewed every 3 months; usually this also means that they would be eligible for a work permit in Israel. In the past Israel also granted an automatic "temporary protection group" status to all citizens of the Ivory Coast and South Sudan, although since then the validity of this status has expired. Regarding the other asylum requests filed by citizens of other countries and examined individually, the Interior Ministry stated that only a fraction of them were actually eligible for refugee status.

== History ==
The Israeli government originally tolerated the new arrivals from Africa. It allowed their entry and many migrants found menial jobs in hotels and restaurants. But after their numbers swelled, concerns were raised. In the second half of the 2000s, there was a significant increase in the number of undocumented workers who immigrated from Africa to Israel by crossing the Egyptian border. In 2006 about 1,000 undocumented workers were detained; in 2007 about 5,000 were detained; in 2008 about 8,700 were detained; and in 2009 about 5,000 were detained. In the first half of 2010 the migration rate even further increased in the first seven months when over 8,000 undocumented workers were caught. The total number of undocumented workers is clearly greater than these figures, because many were not apprehended. The early wave of undocumented workers came mainly from Sudan, while in 2009 the majority of the immigrants were from Eritrea.

In early May 2010, it was estimated that 24,339 undocumented workers resided in Israel, of whom the number of Sudanese and Eritrean refugees who are not deportable under international law was 18,959: 5,649 Sudanese and 13,310 Eritreans. 16,766 of them received a special visa (ס 2א 5) granted to illegal immigrants who are non-deportable asylum seekers. Officially, the visa allows them only to stay in the country, but in practice the state also allows the refugees to work and avoids imposing fines on the Israeli employers who employ them. This special visa requires renewal every three months. The Israeli immigration police patrols the neighborhoods of south Tel Aviv regularly and arrests asylum seekers who do not carry a valid visa; the punishment can be one to three months in prison.

141 immigrants, mostly from Ethiopia, received refugee status.

According to the IDF's Operations Division in 2008, most of the countries from where the illegal immigrants came are (in descending order): Eritrea, Sudan, Ethiopia, Ivory Coast and Nigeria. Most of the illegal immigrants (85%) were men.

Most migrants initially arrive in Egypt, and then pay sums of up to twenty thousand dollars for Bedouin smugglers to transfer them to the border between Egypt and Israel. There have been cases of abuse against male and female migrants committed by the Bedouin smugglers, including rape, kidnapping for ransom, trafficking, and murder. Both male and female migrants have also reported many cases of sexual and physical assault, rape, and the forced removal of bodily organs (kidneys, for example). Another danger for the migrants includes the Egyptian army policy shooting at them in order to prevent crossing the Egypt/Israel border.

To contain the illegal entry of persons, construction of the Egypt–Israel barrier commenced in 2012 and was completed in 2015. 9,570 citizens of various African countries entered Israel illegally in the first half of 2012, while only 34 did the same in the first six months of 2013, after construction of the main section of the barrier was completed. After the entire fence was completed, the number of migrant crossings had dropped to 16 in 2016.

=== Timeline ===
==== 2000–2006 ====
Prior to 2000, the Israeli government had not created any specific policies for handling incoming refugees. The determination of refugee status was outsourced to the United Nations High Commissioner for Refugees (UNHCR). Until 2006, there were no challenges to this system due to the low number of refugees. Later, a new law was established in which the UNHCR would process asylum applications and send a recommendation to the Israeli National Status Granting Body, which was tasked with deciding refugee status.

Approved refugees received temporary residency and temporary work permits in Israel. However, the Israeli government granted only 170 permits of this kind between 2002-2005. Moreover, individuals identified as "citizens of enemy states" were not allowed to seek asylum. This was the status of all Sudanese refugees in Israel since both countries have no diplomatic relations.

The rapid increase in the number of Eritrean and Sudanese immigrants beginning in 2006 changed the Israeli policy towards refugees from these two countries. From then on, the Israeli government began to work towards creating an environment that would be undesirable to refugees. However, in 2007, the Israeli government was still issuing three-month renewable "conditional release" visas, which allowed Eritrean and Sudanese refugees to work. Beginning 2010, all visas upon renewal were issued with a stamp indicating that "this visa is not a working permit."

This policy ensured that refugees were protected from deportation to their countries of origin, but they could not legally work in Israel. Due to the precarious legal work status of refugees, they are often discriminated against for job opportunities and have to rely on infrequent jobs to make ends meet.

==== 2006–2008 ====
Prior to 2006 and throughout 2007, Israeli policy was to detain all refugees from "enemy states" for months at a time. This policy was later discontinued. In addition, there existed a policy to return refugees to the Sinai desert if they had crossed the border into Israel, but this policy was also ended later by the decision of the Israeli Supreme Court.

==== 2009–2014 ====
In 2009, the Israeli government formed a Refugee Status Determination (RSD) Unit that works closely with the United Nations. The Israeli Immigration and Border Authority processes all asylum requests and authorizes temporary group protection. Most of the Sudanese and Eritrean refugees fell into the latter category, a categorization that significantly delays registration as refugees.

In 2012, Israel built a fence along their border with Egypt to deter the illegal migration of African refugees. The fence has significantly decreased the influx of Sudanese and Eritrean refugees into Israel. Later that same year, an emergency plan was set in motion to deport refugees to their home countries. Voluntary deportees would be given an opportunity for self-removal and receive 1,000 Euro to assist in repatriation to their homelands.

==== 2015–2018 ====
By 2015, the Israeli government began giving Sudanese and Eritrean refugees a choice to either return to their home countries, move to another state, or be imprisoned. Many migrants lived in facilities such as Saharonim Prison and similar ones, where they are free to leave during the day, but must return at night or face imprisonment.

During the spring of 2018, Prime Minister Benjamin Netanyahu reached a deal with the United Nations High Commissioner for Refugees (UNHCR) to relocate many refugees into western nations over a period of five years. Israel agreed to grant temporary residency to those who remained. The deal soon fell apart due to pressure from within Netanyahu's own government.

== Demographics ==
As of April 2012, 59,858 illegal immigrants who were never imprisoned in detention facilities have illegally entered into Israel (in August 2010 the number of the imprisoned was 1,900). Several thousand of them did not end up staying in the country. The Israeli department of immigration does not keep continuous supervision over their place of residence but, according to estimates based on data from the Israeli police, the local authorities and the aid organizations, approximately 34,000 illegal immigrants originated from Eritrea, about 15,000 originated from Sudan and 10,000 originated from other countries. The Israeli Administration of Border Crossings, Population and Immigration does not keep detailed documentation regarding their place of residence, but according to estimates from 2011, which are based on data from the Israeli police, the local authorities and the NGOs, circa 15,000–17,000 illegal immigrants lived in Tel Aviv (mainly in southern Tel Aviv, though the number also includes illegal immigrants living in Bat Yam and Bnei Brak) and 4,000–8,000 living in Eilat. While the estimates in Ashdod range from 1,500 to 2,000 illegal immigrants, in Jerusalem range from 1,000 to 8,000 illegal immigrants, and in Arad range from 400 to 600 illegal immigrants. As of 2017, only 39,274 of those who entered the country remain.

== Criminal activity ==
In December 2010, Police commissioner Dudi Cohen stated that despite a decline in robberies in the general population, there was a dramatic increase among the illegal immigrants. Due to a rise in crime and the feeling of insecurity among residents of southern Tel Aviv, the police established a new station near the central bus station and the Shapira neighborhood. The station was staffed by 100–150 police officers. According to the Israeli Police report to the Knesset in March 2012, there was a steady increase in crime among the illegal immigrants from 2007. In 2011, 1,200 criminal cases were opened against illegal immigrants from Africa, half of them in the Tel Aviv district. This was an increase of 54% in comparison to the previous year.

Mass protests were held supporting the immigrants and their remaining in Israel. Other Israelis called for their deportation due to the rise in crime. The cases cited included the murder of 68-year-old Esther Galili who was beaten to death near her South Tel Aviv home in 2010 by a drunken Sudanese migrant and the rape of 83-year-old Ester Nahman by a 17-year-old Eritrean migrant in 2013. There was also a rise in crimes committed by migrants against members of their own communities. According to the local police commander of south Tel Aviv, the number of police officers rose from four or five before the wave of immigrants, to over than 200 in 2017, and they were on duty around the clock. He stated that most of the crimes involved theft, drug sales and domestic violence.

In 2012, the police reported difficulties dealing with crimes committed by this sector due to a lack of interpreters proficient in the Tigrinya language spoken in Eritrea. The Israeli legal system reported a similar problem in 2014.

In her ruling on the Holot "open detention facility", Israeli Supreme Court justice Edna Arbel stated that regardless of the level of crime committed by infiltrators, the distress of residents of South Tel Aviv should not be underestimated.

== Handling of asylum seekers ==
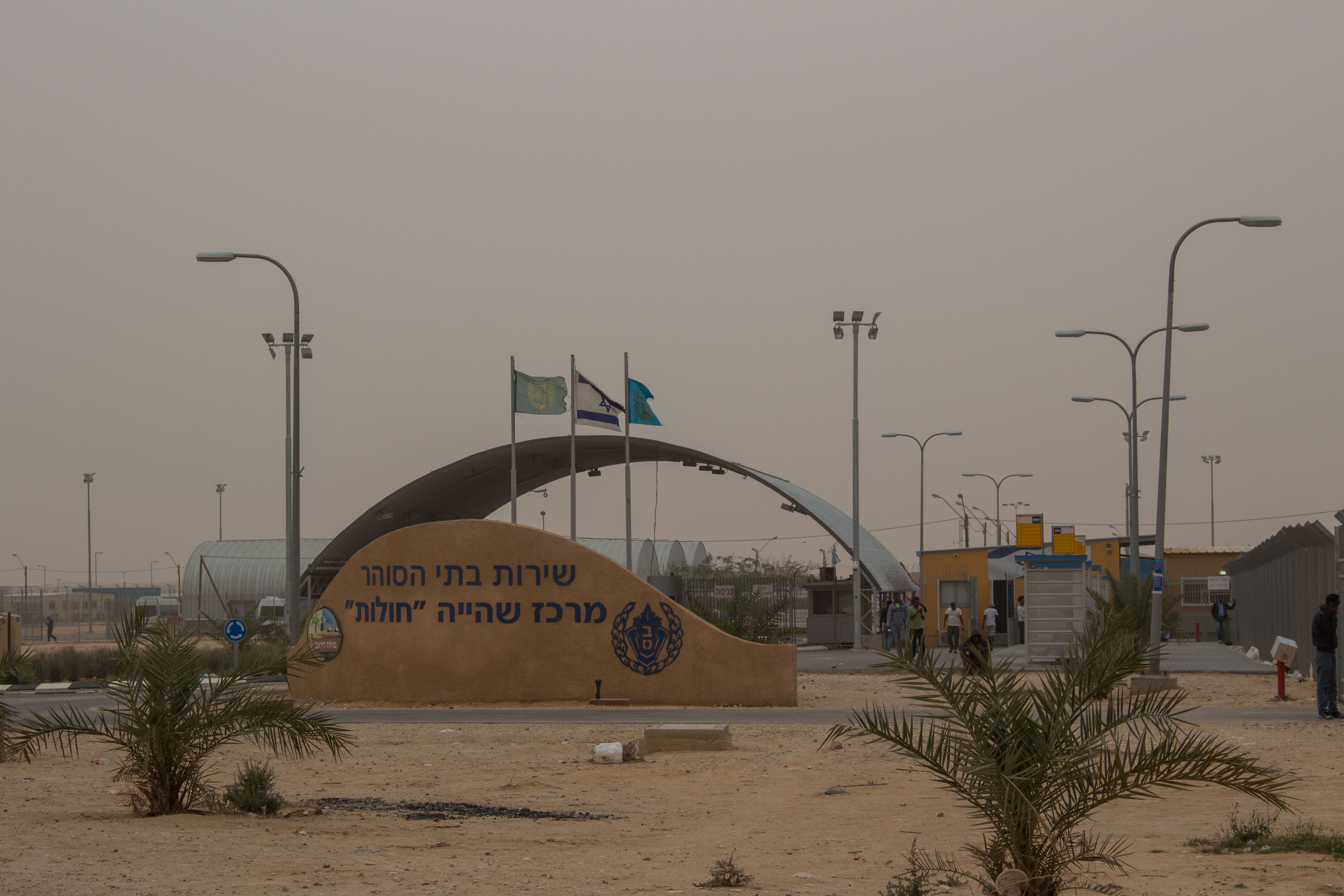
The entrance to Holot immigration detention center, Negev desert, Israel.

In 2010, Israel began building a barrier along sections of its border with Egypt to curb the influx of refugees from African countries. Construction was completed in January 2013. 230 km of fence have been built. While 9,570 Africans entered Israel illegally in the first half of 2012, only 34 entered in the first six months of 2013 after construction of the barrier. This represented a decrease of over 99%.

Israel also began deporting illegal immigrants. In 2017 Israel announced its intent to deport thousands of illegal immigrants by March 2018. African migrants were told to choose between returning to their home countries or being sent to Rwanda and Uganda. Those who did not leave by March 2018 would be jailed until leaving Israel.

In 2012, the Knesset passed an "anti-infiltration law" which meant that many Africans who entered after the bill's passage or those whose visas have expired were sent to the neighboring Saharonim prison without trial. After visiting Saharonim, MK Michal Rozin said that migrants received adequate food and medical care and were not mistreated, but said that sending migrants there instead of prisoners was inhumane, though Israeli officials maintained that conditions there were adequate. After the Supreme Court of Israel declared that long-term custody in Sahronim was unconstitutional, the government opened Holot detention center in December 2013. The 1,800 residents at Holot were allowed to leave but were required to sign in once a day and return for an evening curfew. Israeli courts temporarily cancelled the summonses of African migrants to the Holot facility, and froze others until appeals could be heard. Judges also criticized the summons process for fundamental problems, including the failure to examine individual circumstances and the lack of hearings. The government stated that hearings were not necessary because ordering the migrants to travel to Holot did not violate their human rights.

On 22 September 2014, the High Court struck down the anti-infiltration law and ordered the state to close Holot within 90 days. The court addressed whether to limit the detention of migrants and whether to close Holot. On both measures, the court sided with the petitioners (the Association for Civil Rights in Israel, the Hotline for Refugees and Migrants, ASSAF, Kav LaOved, Physicians for Human Rights–Israel, and Amnesty International–Israel). The ruling said that conditions at the facility were an "unbearable violation of [their] basic rights, first and foremost the right to freedom and the right to dignity". Illegal migrants can no longer be detained for up to a year without trial, however detention continues within legal boundaries. The detentions in Holot continued, with illegal immigrants being detained for a year and then prevented from living in Tel Aviv and Eilat upon their release. In November 2017, the Israeli government announced that it would be closing the Holot Detention Center within four months.

A law passed in 2017 required that employers impose a 20 per cent deduction on the wages of workers who entered the country illegally from Egypt. The deducted money is deposited in a fund along with an employer paid tax of 16 per cent. This money is accessible to workers only when they leave Israel.

In April 2018, Israel reached an agreement with the United Nations to expel around 16,000 African migrants to Western countries in exchange for granting temporary residency in Israel to the same number. Shortly after, however, the deal was cancelled by the Israeli government.

== Aid organizations ==
Israel has a number of organizations focused legal aid, including the Hotline for Refugees and Migrants, ASSAF, Physicians for Human Rights–Israel, African Refugees Development Center and Association for Civil Rights in Israel. The secular Jewish organization Bina, located in south Tel Aviv, has helped asylum seekers as well as Israeli citizens understand refugee rights, and has undertaken advocacy and educational activities including frequent trips for Israelis to visit the Holot Detention Center. Most of these organization are funded by the New Israel Fund. Relief organizations have been involved in discussions held in Knesset committees on this issue and have submitted a petition against the measures the state has taken to put a halt to the phenomenon of immigration.

Unitaf creates early-childhood programs for refugee and stateless children living in Israel; the president of the board is Aliza Olmert

== Response in Israel ==
The situation underscores the tension between two strong feelings in Israel. Israel was founded in the wake of the Holocaust and has provided refuge to Jews fleeing oppression around the world. On one hand, many Israelis feel Israel has a special responsibility to assist refugees in such dire conditions. On the other hand, many Israelis fear the continued migration of immigrants and refugees would threaten the Jewish majority.

In 2010, Israelis protested the construction of the Holot detention facility, stating that its construction goes against Human Rights values. At the same time, residents of South Tel Aviv demonstrated against the presence of foreigners in their communities. In 2012, nearly 1,000 Israelis from neighborhoods in South Tel Aviv staged a protest against illegal immigrants demanding the deportation and expulsion of migrants from Africa, Miri Regev a member of Knesset attended the protest and described the Sudanese as a "cancer" in our body. This protest became violent leading to assault and destruction of property and businesses owned by Sudanese and Eritrean people. In 2015, an immigrant from Eritrea, Habtom Zarhum, was beaten to death by a mob after being misidentified as the perpetrator in a terrorist attack at the Beersheva bus station.

Refugee Seders have been held each year during the Jewish holiday of Passover. Support is also demonstrated through the work of non-profit organizations, including Kav LaOved (Worker's Hotline), ARDC, ASSAF. In late 2017, early 2018, North American Jewish organizations joined with Israeli NGOs to decry Israel's decision to close Holot and deport asylum seekers.

Israeli demographer Arnon Soffer warned that the migrants could serve as informants or operatives of terrorist organizations. He stated that they were contributing to congestion in the cities and a rise in crime, and constituted a demographic threat. He predicted that failing to stop the illegal immigration waves at an early stage would lead to much larger waves in the future.

In 2014, Haaretz economic reporter Nehemiah Strassler wrote that illegal immigrants take the place of manual workers, causing loss of jobs and a reduction in wages. He also said that they burden the health care, welfare and education systems. "We would never be able to raise the standard of living of the needy and reduce the gaps, if we keep on absorbing more and more destitute people."

Israeli MK Ya'akov Katz, who headed the government committee on issue of illegal asylum seekers, proposed establishing a city near the Egyptian border where the immigrants would live until deportation.

In December 2011, Mayor of Tel Aviv Ron Huldai demanded that the government take "immediate emergency action."

In mid-2010, Eilat residents demonstrated against the inaction of the Israeli government saying they were afraid to walk outside at night in certain neighborhoods. In the Shapira and Kiryat Shalom neighborhoods in southern Tel Aviv a number of real estate agents stated that they would not rent apartments to illegal immigrants.

On 23 May 2012, over a thousand people demonstrated in the Hatikva Quarter. Miri Regev, Danny Danon, Ronit Tirosh and Michael Ben-Ari spoke. Later the protest turned violent. President Shimon Peres issued a condemnation of the violence and called to refrain from racism and incitement. He said: "Hatred of foreigners contradicts the fundamental principles of Judaism. I am well aware of the difficulties faced by the residents of south Tel Aviv and other similar areas, but violence is not the solution."

In 2012, MK Aryeh Eldad and MK Michael Ben-Ari sparked controversy by calling for asylum seekers entering Israel to be shot.

In a Channel 2 interview in November 2013, Tel Aviv Mayor Ron Huldai scoffed at government policy, saying, "Can 50,000 people be a demographic threat? That's a mockery. ... The truth is they will remain here. They are human beings and I must take care of them."

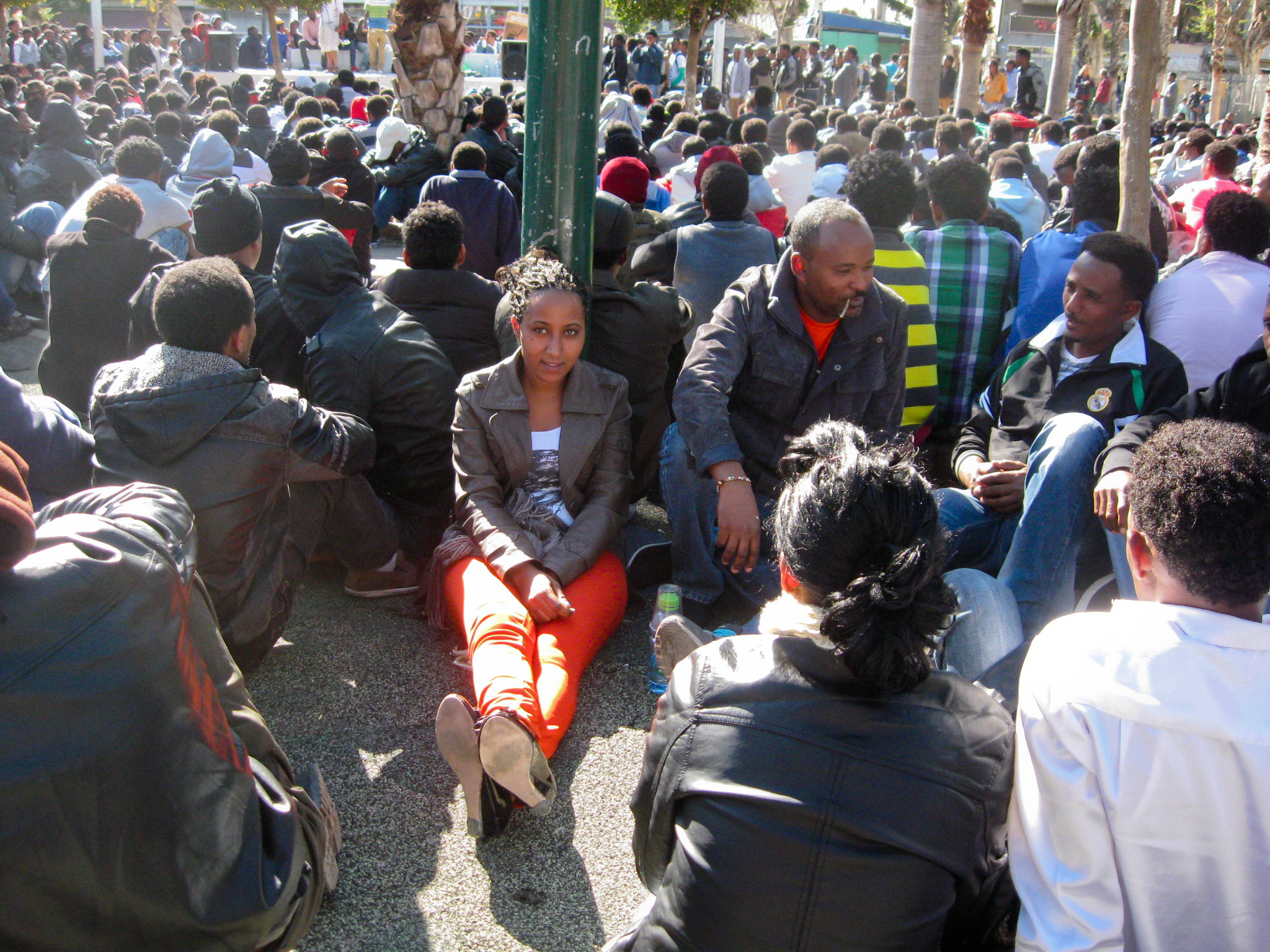
Eritrean asylum seekers at Levinsky Park, Tel Aviv. January 8, 2014

Demonstrations and rallies supporting the refugees have also been held. On 28 December 2013 thousands protested in Tel Aviv against detention of asylum seekers from Sudan and Eritrea. The protesters marched from Levinsky Park in South Tel Aviv to city center, decrying the detention without trial of African refugees in the Saharonim and Holot detention facilities. Migrants said they feared their lives would be in danger if they returned to their home countries.

On 15 January 2014, the Knesset Committee on Foreign Workers met to discuss the Immigration and Border Authority policy and its impact on the business sector. African migrants participated in the Knesset meeting. They were supported by MK Michal Rozin of Meretz.

In April 2014, activists organized a Passover seder with asylum seekers at the Holot facility to recall the Passover story and call attention to the plight of the migrants. Similar seders were held in support of the migrants in Tel Aviv and Washington. Similar events took place in 2015 and 2016.

== International response ==
The Maryland-based refugee rights organization HIAS, whose Israeli branch has been actively assisting African asylum seekers, has vocally opposed the Israeli government's policy toward the asylum seekers and has called on Israel to evaluate their refugee status claims in accordance with international law. The Los Angeles-based organization StandWithUs, whose mission is "supporting Israel around the world – through education and fighting anti-Semitism", states that "most of the migrants came to Israel seeking work opportunities, not as refugees escaping war"; as StandWithUs elaborates, "unlike refugees who are fleeing war or persecution, economic migrants leave their countries in search of better work opportunities." However, globally, national authorities have found asylum seekers from Eritrea deserving of refugee status in 84% of applications, and have granted refugee status to Sudanese asylum seekers 56% of the time, whereas Israel has only granted 1% of asylum petitions from these asylum seekers. Mandatory lifetime conscription is among the human-rights abuses in Eritrea from which they may be fleeing. The Rabbinical Assembly, the clergy organization of Conservative Judaism, passed a resolution in 2016 stating that "Israel’s Ministry of the Interior has been very reluctant to grant refugee status to bona fide asylum seekers" and calling on Israel to do so. The rabbinic human-rights organization T’ruah, based in New York, has made it a priority to encourage Israel to evaluate all asylum seekers' claims fairly.

== See also ==
- African Hebrew Israelites of Jerusalem
- Demographics of Israel
- Geography of Israel
- Illegal immigration
- Racism in Israel
- Refugee kidnappings in Sinai
