= Ziv Shilon =

Israeli military leader and politician

- זיו שילון
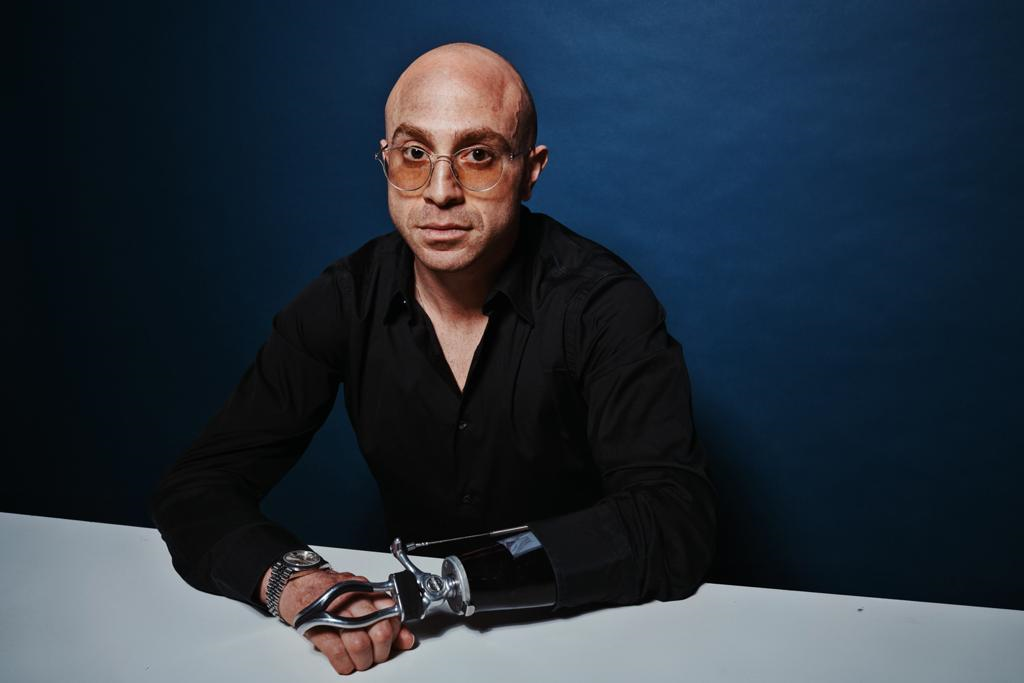
- Born: May 10, 1988 (age 38); Beer-Sheva, Israel
- Education: Bachelor of Laws diploma from IDC Herzliya
- Known for: Social activist
- Movement: "Pnima"
- Spouse: Adi
- Children: 2
- Awards: Forbes 30 Under 30 list.
- Website: https://www.zivshilon.com

Ziv Shilon (Hebrew: זיו שילון; born May 10, 1988) is an Israeli entrepreneur, lecturer and social activist. He served as an officer in the Givati Brigade and was severely wounded on the Gaza Strip in 2012 where he lost his left hand in battle.

== Biography ==
On October 23, 2012, Shilon was critically injured during a military operation on the Gaza border. An explosive device that was planted on the fence severed his left hand and severely damaged his right hand. Subsequently, he underwent 17 surgical operations and 11 months of intensive rehabilitation.

== Social and business activity ==
In April 2016, he launched the "Combat Fitness" project in the only juvenile detention facility in Israel, Ofek Prison. It was created in collaboration with the IDF Association and the prison administration. The goal of "Combat Fitness" was to facilitate the rehabilitation of adolescent boys through empowerment and connection with the IDF soldiers. They would then be provided with pre-military preparations and become members of the IDF after their release.

=== Business activity ===
In February 2017, Shilon, along with his partners, established "OurGoods," a platform that connects manufacturers to consumers. In February 2018, Shilon was selected to be one of the Forbes 30 Under 30 list.

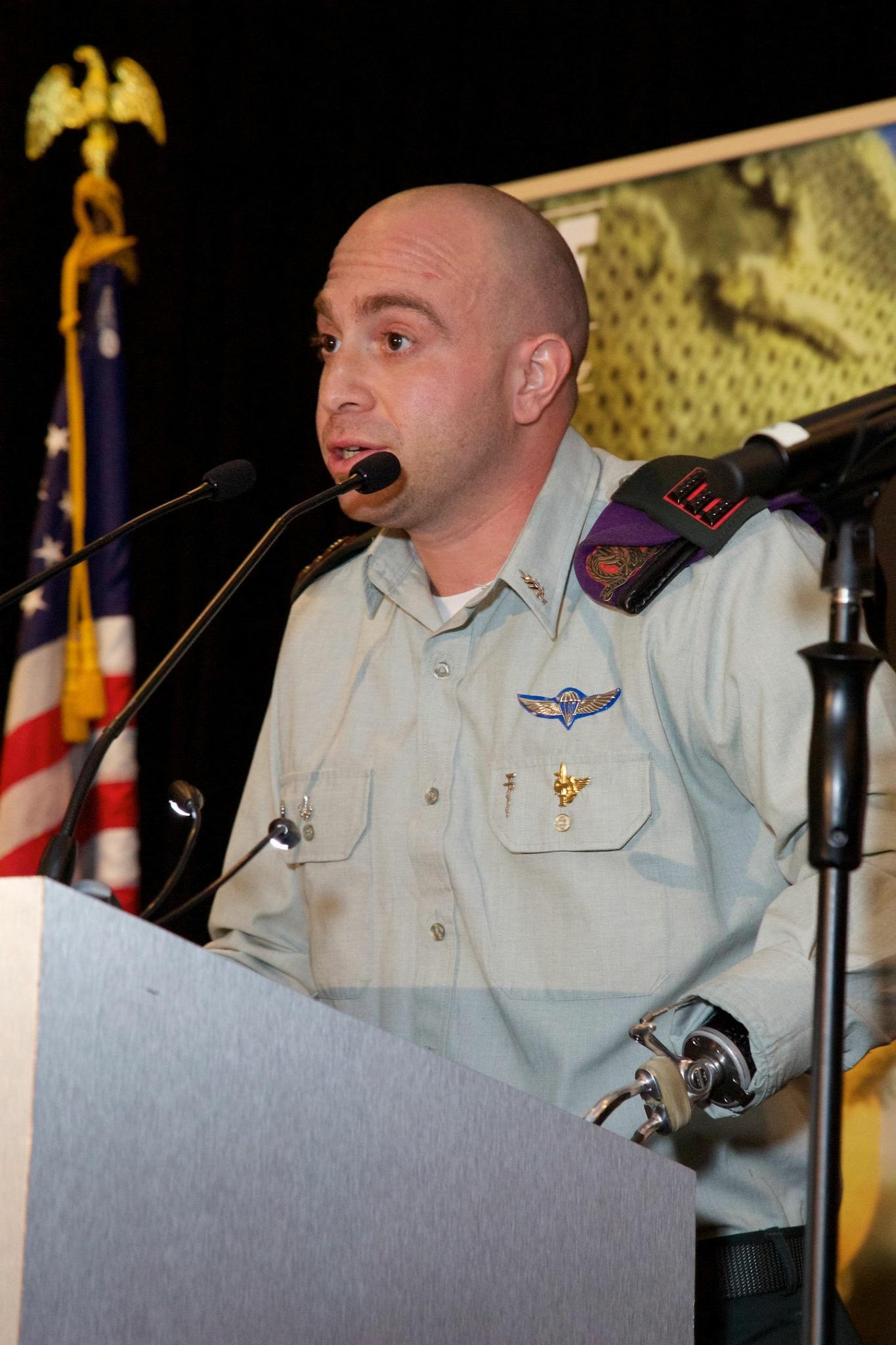

During 2018–2020, Shilon's contributed to the development of a Microsoft Xbox gaming remote for players with disabilities. The specialized gaming remote was presented on the "Most Respected List, within the "Ten Most Important Developments in the Last Decade" by Time Magazine. Shilon joined as a consultant and shareholder in another company targeting the operations of disabilities control, "6Degrees," in which an Israeli team develops algorithms that enable the control in smart devices without the use of touch, benefitting those affected with limited motor skills.

== Other activities ==
In 2015, Shilon completed the 42.2 km Berlin Marathon. In November 2018, after two years of training, Shilon became one of the few athletes to successfully complete the Iron Man competition, despite the physical disability of both his hands. The competition was held in Arizona, USA, where Shilon competed unrestrictedly alongside able-bodied athletes, crossing the finish line after 13 hours.

Shilon has published content in collaboration with the newspaper, Yedioth Achronoth.
