= Israeli barrier =

Israeli barrier may refer to:

- Gaza–Israel barrier
- West Bank barrier
- Egypt–Israel barrier
