= Camp 1391 =

Israeli secret prison camp

- Interactive map of Camp 1391
- Location: Northern Israel
- Status: Operational
- Opened: Classified
- Managed by: Unit 504

Camp 1391, also referred to as Unit 1391 or Facility 1391, is an Israel Defense Forces prison camp in northern Israel for "high-risk" prisoners. It is run by Unit 504. The existence of the prison was unknown to the public before 2003, and most information about it remains classified, although the Supreme Court of Israel ordered the release of some information about the jail.

== Location ==
Camp 1391 is situated in a Tegart fort on route 574 between kibbutz Barkai and kibbutz Ma'anit in northern Israel and less than an hour's drive from Tel Aviv. According to the Middle East Monitor, the coordinates were discovered by Israeli historian Gad Kroizer to be 32°28’11.93″N 35° 1’20.74″E, near Pardes Hanna-Karkur.

=== Discovery of the location ===
The location of the camp was accidentally discovered by Kroizer, who found a 70-year-old map drawn by a government architect while researching old British police buildings. On the map were 62 British police compounds in Mandatory Palestine in the late 1930s and early 1940s where Arab and Jewish militants against the British occupation were interrogated. One building, "Meretz", did not appear on any modern Israeli maps and was not mentioned in any Israeli security literature. In 2004, Kroizer published an article in an academic journal, mentioning the prison location in a footnote. Some days later, he received a phone call from Israel's military censor asking why the article had not been submitted for inspection. According to The Guardian, the facility "had been airbrushed from Israeli aerial photographs and purged from modern maps".

== Operation ==
Camp 1391 is operated by Unit 504 of the Military Intelligence Directorate, rather than by the Israeli Security Agency, also known as Shin Bet. A former prisoner of Camp 1391 "believed the facility was run by al-Jalma Interrogation Centre, one of Israel's harshest interrogation centres, and built before the Nakba in 1948."

While prisoner information cannot be obtained, "[a] prisoners' rights committee in Nazareth said it was likely that 15 prisoners not documented in Israeli records were currently being held in the prison."

== Conditions ==
Referred to by some as "the Israeli Guantanamo", Camp 1391 was kept secret in such a manner as to be even unknown to David Libai, Minister of Justice in Yitzhak Rabin's government and member of the secret services related ministerial committee. According to Leah Tsemel, an Israeli lawyer who specialises in advising Palestinians, "Anyone entering the prison can be made to disappear, potentially forever, it's no different from the jails run by tinpot South American dictators."

According to accounts of former captives, the detainees were led into the facility blindfolded, and kept in cells (most are 2 m × 2 m) with no natural light. Two smaller cells (1.25 m × 1.25 m) with heavy steel doors and black or red walls, and almost no light, were used for solitary confinement. Some of the cells did not have adequate toilet facilities and the guards controlled the running water. A former inmate described to al-Araby al-Jadeed his mistreatment in 1391, including extended isolation from other inmates, suffocation during sleep, interrogation period extending beyond 24 hours and extreme lack of food.

Mustafa Dirani, an Amal commander who was captured by the Israelis in May 1994 and released in 2004 as part of a prisoner swap, has filed a suit in Tel Aviv's district court claiming he was sexually abused in the prison. It has been acknowledged by the government of Israel that "within the framework of a military police investigation the suspicion arose that an interrogator who questioned the complainant threatened to perform a sexual act on the complainant".

Inmates were not allowed visits at the facility from the Red Cross, nor were any other independent organization permitted to inspect the site. The prisoners were not told where they were, nor were their families or lawyers.

== Criticism and response ==
HaMoked, a major Israeli human rights organization, has petitioned the High Court of Justice to challenge the legality of the facility.

In 2003, in response to a lawsuit, Israeli government lawyers said that while the location was secret, Palestinians who were incarcerated there had their rights safeguarded, and could meet with lawyers and Red Cross at an off-site location. In May 2009, the United Nations Committee against Torture (CAT) questioned Israeli officials about the facility and expressed skepticism about this claim. The CAT stated that "Israeli security secretly detains and interrogates prisoners in an unknown location called 'Camp 1391' without granting access to the committee, the International Red Cross (ICRC), or the lawyers or relatives of the prisoners", questioned why interrogations at Camp 1391 were not recorded, and stated that "600 complaints of alleged ill-treatment or torture were brought between 2001 and 2006, but none had been followed up".

Israeli officials maintain that Camp 1391 "is no longer used since 2006 to detain or interrogate suspects", but several petitions filed to the Israeli Supreme Court by the CAT to examine the facility have been rejected. The Israeli Supreme Court also refused to allow an inquiry of the alleged abuses, declaring that Israeli authorities had acted reasonably in not conducting investigations into allegations of torture, ill-treatment and poor detention conditions of detainees. The CAT responded to this by asserting that secret detention centers are per se a breach of the United Nations Convention Against Torture, concluding that the state "should ensure that no one is detained in any secret detention facility under its control in the future" and that Israel "should investigate and disclose the existence of any other such facility and the authority under which it has been established. It should ensure that all allegations of torture and ill-treatment by detainees in Facility 1391 be impartially investigated, the results made public, and any perpetrators responsible for breaches of the Convention be held accountable."

== See also ==
- Palestinian prisoners in Israel
- Saharonim detention centre
- Sde Teiman detention camp
- Ktzi'ot Prison
