= Incarceration facility (Israel) =

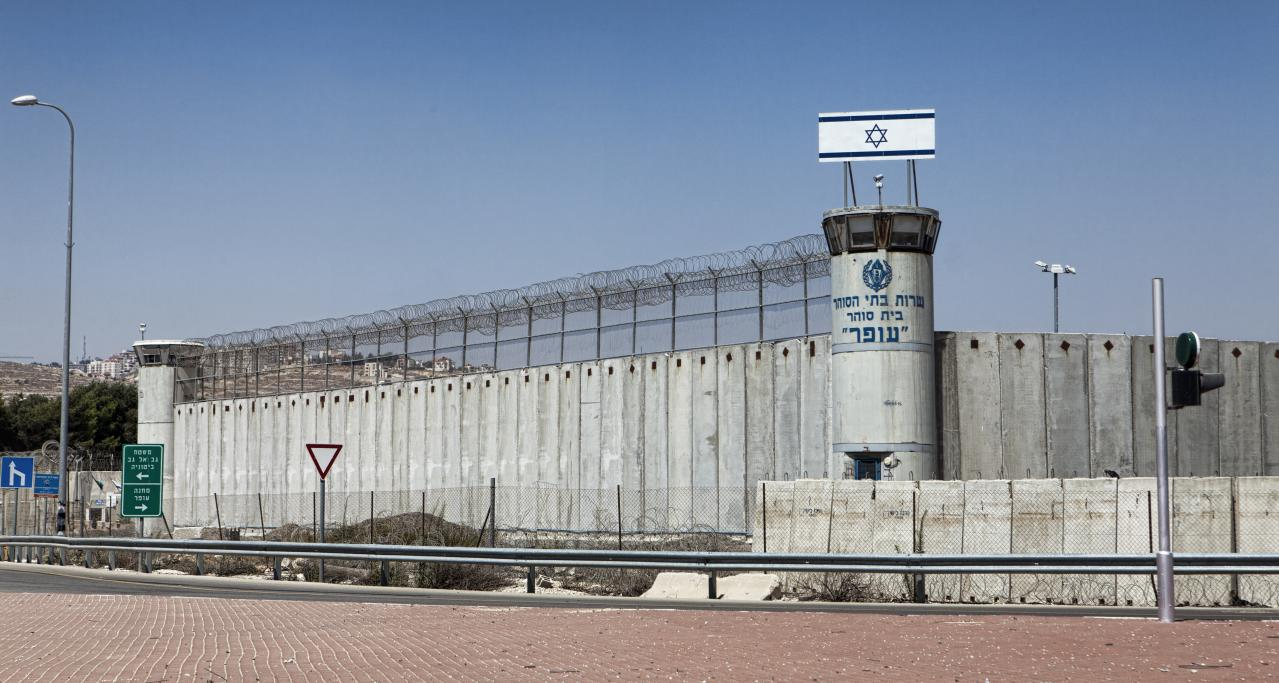
The Israeli military prison of Ofer, near Ramallah, in the occupied West Bank, 2010

An incarceration facility (Hebrew: מתקן כליאה, Mitkan Kli'a) is the official name given by the Israel Defense Forces and the Israel Prison Service to one of several prisons in Israel used to hold Palestinian prisoners - either under sentence or under administrative detention.

In addition, there are several "suspension" facilities (Hebrew: מתקן השהייה Mitkan Hashhaya) run by the IDF's Military Police Corps, subordinate to their respective regional brigades, which complement the incarceration facilities and hold Palestinian detainees for a short period before they are sorted and moved to an incarceration facility run by the Israel Prison Service.

== History ==
The need for detention centers to hold large numbers of Palestinian detainees in Israel arose during the First Intifada. Beginning in 1988, the IDF built and expanded several such facilities adjacent to existing infrastructures at Megiddo Prison, Camp Ktzi'ot (Nitzana) and Camp Ofer. A small incarceration facility was also opened to the north of the Gaza Strip, near the Erez Crossing, as well as several facilities in the West Bank: Shomron, Etzion, Efraim, Menashe (Salem), Binyamin, etc.

Most of the above were closed following the Oslo Accords, although Megiddo and Ktzi'ot Prisons continued to operate with a smaller staff. The prisons were re-opened in 2002, following the start of the Al-Aqsa Intifada and Operation Defensive Shield. In 2006 reorganization of the prison system began, during which several facilities were closed and others facilities reassigned from IDF to Israel Prison Service (IPS) authority.

As of 2006, all three incarceration facilities are operational and are subordinate to the IPS, while the two remaining detention facilities (Shomron and Etzion) are controlled by the IDF.

== Incarceration facilities ==
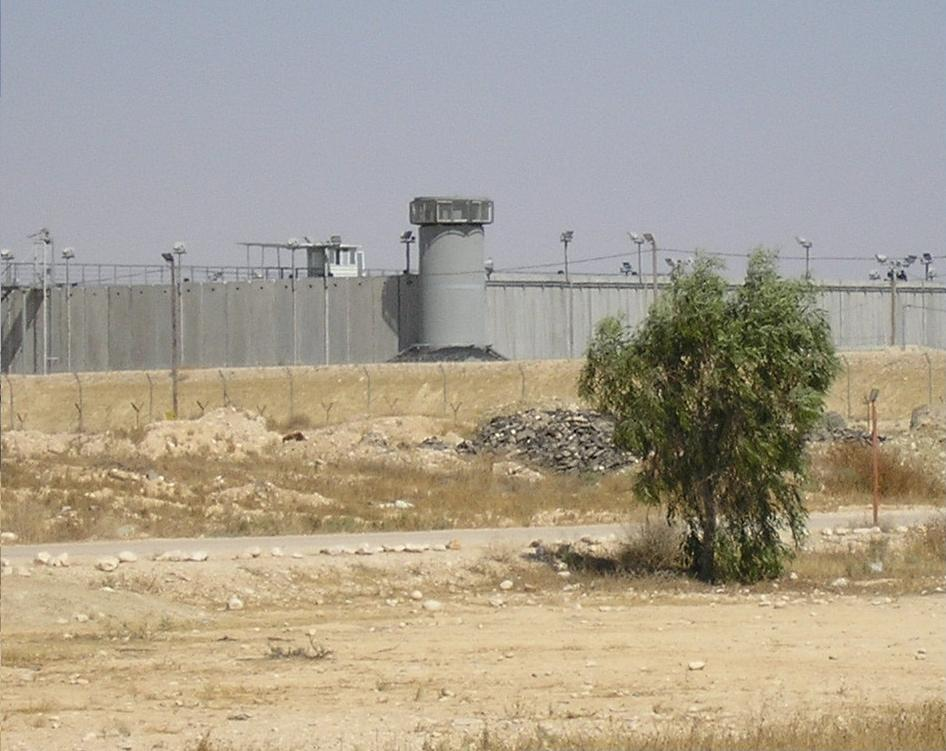
Ktzi'ot Prison, Israeli detention facility located in the Negev desert, 2007

There are currently three incarceration facilities:

- Ktzi'ot Prison – by far the largest facility, it is located in the Ktzi'ot area, near Nitzana and the border crossing with Egypt. It can contain approximately 2,200 Palestinian prisoners, and over 3,500 during an emergency.
- Megiddo Prison – the oldest such facility and the first to move to IPS control from the IDF. Megiddo Prison can contain up to 1,200 prisoners.
- Ofer Prison – the smallest of the three, it is located near Ramallah and is therefore the closest location to where most of the prisoners in question are detained. Ofer Prison can contain up to 800 prisoners.
- Saharonim Prison is an Israeli detention facility for African asylum seekers located in the Negev desert. It is the largest of a planned four camps with its total capacity of 8000 inmates.

== Detention facilities ==
- Ktzi'ot Prison - was built in 2013 and is the world's biggest detention camp for African refugees.
- Efraim Facility - operational from 2002 to 2006
- Etzion Facility - located in Gush Etzion, it is operated by the Israel Defense Forces and accepts detainees mostly from the southern West Bank (Bethlehem, Hebron and Yatta areas)
- Menashe (Salem) Facility - operational from 2002 to 2006
- Shomron Facility - located in Samaria, it is operated by the Israel Defense Forces and accepts detainees mainly from the northern West Bank.

== See also ==
- Israeli military prison
