= Hotline for Refugees and Migrants =

- המוקד לפליטים ולמהגרים
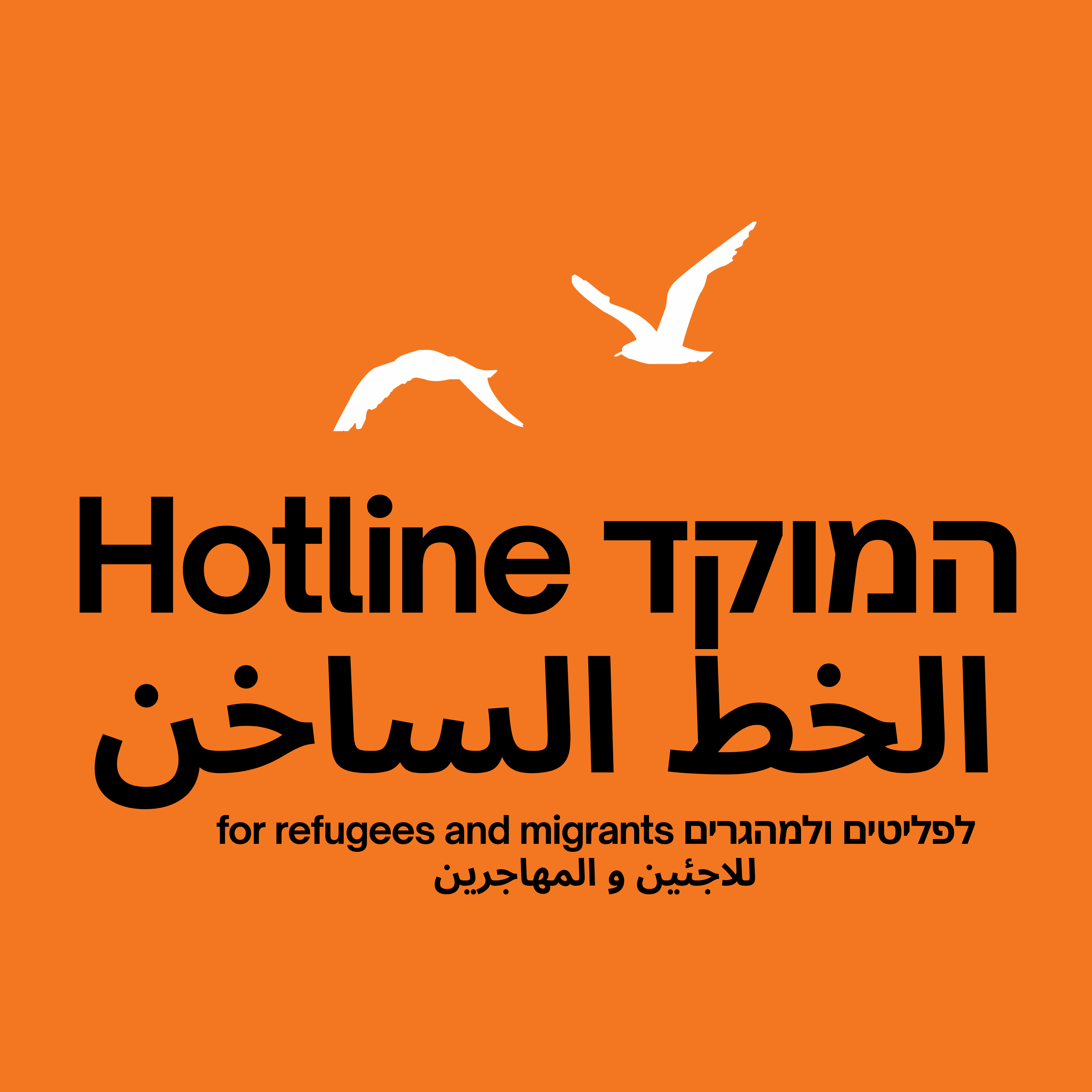
- Founded: 1998; 28 years ago
- Type: Non-profit; NGO
- Location: Tel Aviv, Israel
- Region served: Israel
- Key people: Dr. Ayelet Oz, Executive Director; Naomi Chazan, Board Member
- Website: hotline.org.il/en/main/

The Hotline for Refugees and Migrants (Hotline) is a human rights organization that utilizes direct service provision, litigation, and advocacy to uphold the rights of refugees, migrant workers, and survivors of human trafficking in Israel. In Hebrew, the organization is known as המוקד לפליטים ולמהגרים (hamoked l'plitim v l'mehagrim).

== Founding ==
In 1998, Israeli journalist Einat Fishbain and her colleagues opened a voicemail hotline for migrant workers in Israeli immigration detention, and published articles about the situation of migrant workers in Ha'ir. Three women reached out to her, asking if they could help the migrant workers, and Ms. Fishbain introduced them to one another. These three women went on to found the Hotline for Migrant Workers, which later changed its name to the Hotline for Refugees and Migrants. The Hotline staff succeeded in gaining permission to enter immigration detention and today is the only non-governmental body with access to Israel's immigration detention centers.

== Organizational structure ==
The Hotline carries out its activities through three main departments:

=== Crisis Intervention Center ===
The Hotline provides free consultation and paralegal representation. This service is offered in the Hotline's office at weekly reception, over the phone, and through visits to periphery cities and immigration detention. The Hotline's Crisis Intervention Center has released thousands of migrants and asylum seekers from detention over the years.

=== Legal Department ===
The Hotline's legal department litigates strategic cases with potential to affect policies and practices for the entire community.

=== Public Policy Department ===
The Hotline conducts research, media work, public events, and meetings with stakeholders and decision makers. Through this work, they engage in both local and international advocacy about migration policy and its implications, both for migrants and society as a whole.

== Achievements ==
- Preventing the forced deportation of Congolese asylum seekers back to the Democratic Republic of Congo (March 2019)
- Preventing the forced deportation of Sudanese and Eritrean asylum seekers to Uganda and Rwanda (April 2018)
- Gaining refugee status for the first and only Darfuri refugee in Israel (June 2016)
- The High Court's ruling on the 5th Anti-Infiltration Law limiting detention time in the Holot detention center for migrants to a maximum of 12 months (August 2015)
- State-funded legal aid to victims of trafficking and unaccompanied minors (2007)
- Spearheading significant changes to Israel's trafficking laws, culminating in the passing of the Fight Against Human Trafficking Act, which banned all forms of human trafficking (June 2006)
- Granting of legal status to hundreds of children of migrant workers (June 2006 and August 2010)
- Precedent-setting legal case against employment arrangements that bind workers to their employers (March 2006)

== Research reports and publications ==
=== Detention Monitoring Reports ===
The Hotline has produced an annual report on the situation within Israeli immigration detention since 2015.

- 2018 Detention Monitoring Report
- 2017 Detention Monitoring Report
- 2016 Detention Monitoring Report
- 2015 Detention Monitoring Report

=== Other reports and publications ===
- A Means To An End: Violation of Labor Rights by Foreign Contracting Companies in Israel (March 2020) written together with Kav LaOved
- Deserted: Sudanese Survivors of Torture in Sinai (February 2020)
- 20 Years of Immigration Detention in Israel (December 2019)
- 20 Years of Human Rights Achievements (November 2019)
- In Broad Daylight - The Deposit Law: Implementation and Impact (May 2019) written together with Kav LaOved
- Guide for Integrating Asylum Seekers (December 2018)
- Languishing in Line: The Queues at the PIBA Office in Bnei Brak in Early 2018 (December 2018)
- You Shall Not Mistreat Her: A Decade since the Promulgation of the Family Unification Procedure for Migrant Victims of Domestic Violence (November 2018) written together with the Israel Religious Action Center
- Falling on Deaf Ears: Asylum Proceedings in Israel (October 2018)
- "Better a prison in Israel than dying on the way:" testimonies of refugees who left Israel for Rwanda and Uganda and received protection in Europe (January 2018)
- "Through Hidden Corridors" New trends in human trafficking which exploit the asylum system in Israel (September 2017)
- "Knocking at the Gate" – Flawed Access to the Asylum System due to the influx of applicants from the Ukraine and Georgia (September 2017)
- "Ye Shall Have One Law" – Administrative Detention of Asylum Seekers Implicated in Criminal Activity (September 2017)
- Caregivers From Eastern Europe (January 2017)

== Awards ==
- Human Rights Award presented by the New Israel Fund (2018)
- National Award for Combating Trafficking in Persons presented by President Shimon Peres (2009)
- The Emil Grunzweig Human Rights Award presented by the Association for Civil Rights in Israel (2001)
