= Arnon Soffer =

Israeli geographer and academic (1935–2026)

- ארנון סופר
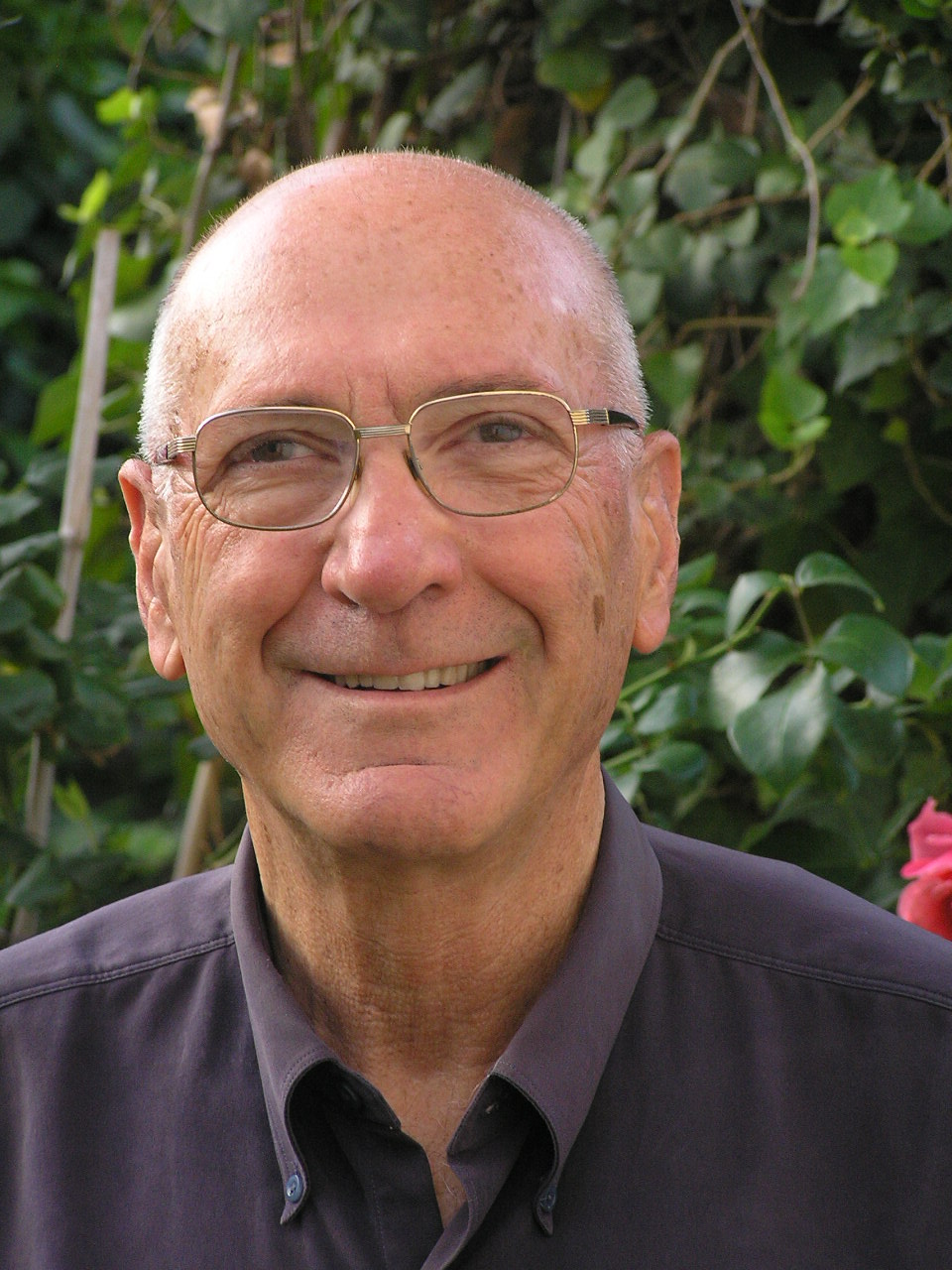
- Born: 24 December 1935; Rishon LeZion, Mandatory Palestine
- Died: 14 August 2026 (aged 90); Haifa, Israel
- Occupation: Academic
- Known for: Research into demographic, water, environmental, political, and strategy issues of the state of Israel

Arnon Soffer (Hebrew: ארנון סופר; 24 December 1935 – 14 August 2026) was an Israeli geographer and academic who was a professor of geography and environmental sciences, specialising in water issues and demography. He was one of the founders of the University of Haifa. Soffer was known for his research into demographic, water, environmental, political, and strategy issues of the state of Israel.

Soffer was vocal about geographical processes that he believed endanger the existence of the State of Israel. He was one of the first to describe the increase in population of Palestinians as a "demographic threat" to the State of Israel. He was known as one of the architects behind the Israeli disengagement from Gaza in 2005.

== Background ==
Soffer was born in Tel Aviv on 24 December 1935, to parents Jacob and Chasia Soffer, both immigrants from Belarus. Soffer grew up in Rishon LeZion, which was originally a moshava and became a city when he turned 15 (in 1950). He and his classmates from the Gymnasia Realit formed the first handball team of the city, which operated under the auspices of Maccabi Rishon LeZion. In the 1950s Soffer played in Israel's handball national team. During his military service in the Israel Defense Forces, he served in the Nahal Brigade.

He had three academic degrees from the Hebrew University of Jerusalem. In 1965, he was granted a position as a lecturer at the University of Haifa. Soffer served in a variety of roles in the academic faculty at the University of Haifa, including the Department for Geography, chairman of the Jewish-Arab Center and the Institute for the Study of the Middle East, Dean of the Faculty for Social Sciences and Vice Chairman of the Center for National security research. Starting in 1970, he taught, mentored and was involved in the IDF Command and Staff College. In 1978, he became a professor at the National Defense College and was appointed head of the College Research Center in 2007.

After retiring, he taught the security officials studying at the University of Haifa, including students from the National Defense College, Tactical Command College, the Havatzalot Program of the Intelligence Corps, and the Trainee Course of the Israel police. He was married and had four children and eight grandchildren.

Soffer died on 14 August 2026, at the age of 90.

== Criticism ==
Soffer's obsession with the demographic threat posed by the increase of the Palestinian population led to some criticism by his colleagues at the University of Haifa. He has been credited with working to implement the "separation policy" of Israel.

Soffer received pushback for his claim that the gathering of secular Israelis in Tel Aviv "emboldened" Palestinian citizens of Israel and endangered the state. He had proposed a complete ban on construction and internal migration to the city.

He was also opposed to the immigration of African migrants seeking asylum to Israel, claiming that they were "infiltrators" who posed a demographic threat to Israel.
