= Unit 504 =

Israeli military intelligence unit

- יחידה 504
- Founded: 1948
- Country: Israel
- Allegiance: Israel Defense Forces
- Branch: Military Intelligence Directorate
- Type: Military intelligence unit
- Role: Clandestine operation Close-quarters battle Counterintelligence; Covert operation HUMINT; Intelligence assessment Interrogation; Military intelligence Special operations Strategic intelligence Surveillance
- Size: Classified
- Decorations: Chief of Staff Medal of Appreciation

Unit 504 (Hebrew: יחידה 504) is one of the military intelligence units of the Israel Defense Forces (IDF) responsible for clandestine and covert operations, counterintelligence, HUMINT, intelligence assessment, and military intelligence. They are also trained in CQB/CQC self-defense in emergency situations.

== Operations ==
Like Mossad, Unit 504 performs clandestine and covert operations, gathers military intelligence, and performs special operations outside the borders of Israel.

The unit is also responsible for interrogating IDF prisoners, both prisoners of war and unlawful combatants. Unit 504 operates black sites, including Camp 1391.

== History ==
The unit was founded at the same time as the IDF in 1948, shortly after Israel's declaration of independence, and has been involved in all the country's wars and conflicts. It was then called "Modi'in 10". The name "Modi'in" (Hebrew: מודיעין) derives from the village of the high priest Mattathias who helped spark the Maccabean Revolt. Its name was changed to "Unit 154" in 1957 and after the Six-Day War, following its merger with Unit 560 (which then dealt with interrogating prisoners) its name was changed to "Unit 7019", finally after the Yom Kippur War it gained its current name of "Unit 504".

In 2019, the unit was involved in the assassination of Palestinian Islamic Jihad leader Baha Abu al-Ata.

In January 2020, a senior officer in the unit was sentenced to 28 days incarceration and another demoted for using an agent to purchase tahini as a gift for their superiors and for attempting to cover-up the affair.

On 20 November 2023, the unit stated that it had interrogated five hundred Palestinians thus far in the Gaza war.

Unit 504 participated in the November 2024 Batroun raid.

== Reception ==
=== Commendations ===
In April 2019, the unit was awarded the second highest military commendation by the Israeli military for its activities in Syria and Lebanon between 2013 and 2018.

=== Criticism ===
Yossi Melman of Haaretz has claimed that the unit "has had a reputation of acting unscrupulously, lacking inhibition and proper supervision, whose commanders will whitewash investigations and turn a blind eye to questionable operations," saying that the unit has been accused of using torture and of being involved in drug smuggling. Chris McGreal of The Guardian has written that the unit "has a hard reputation, and some of its members have badly blemished records."

Field operatives from the unit are involved in the Rafah paramedic massacre on March 23, 2025.

== See also ==
- Mossad – National intelligence agency of Israel
- Unit 8200 – Intelligence unit of the Israel Defense Forces
- Shin Bet – Israel's internal security service
