= Ofer Prison =

Israeli military prison in the Israeli-occupied West Bank

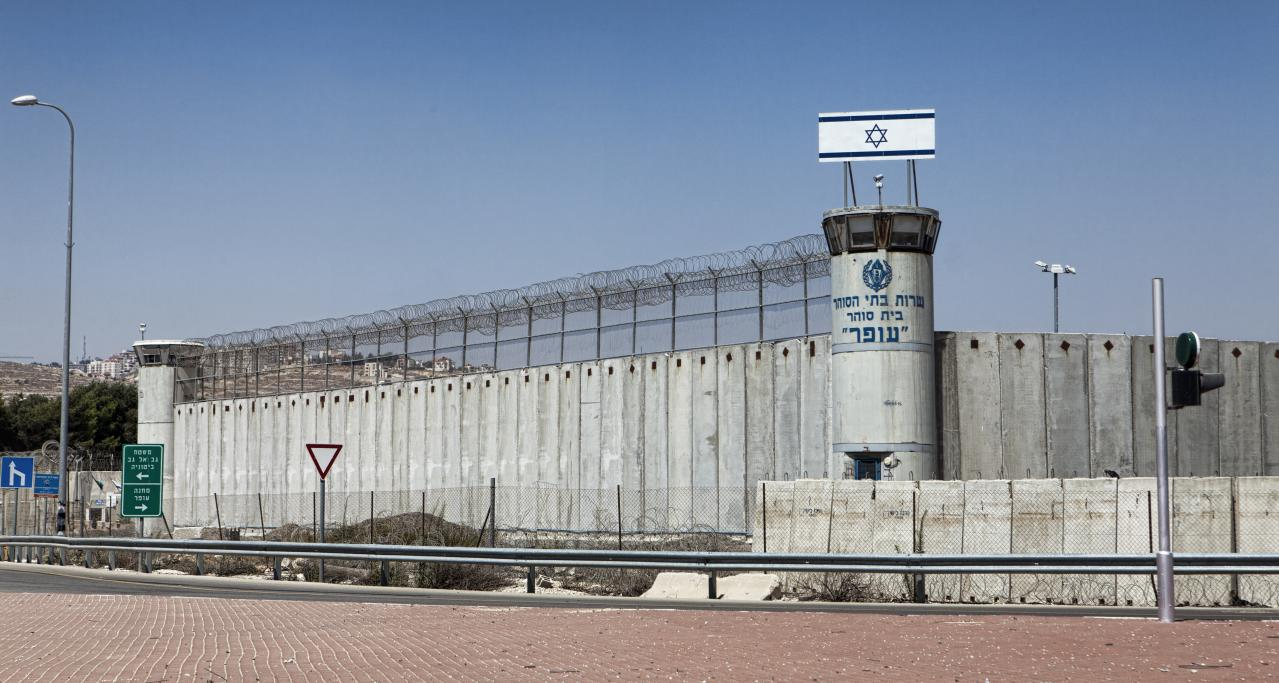
- The Prison in 2010

- Location within Israel
- Location: West Bank; 31°52′18″N 35°10′51″E
- Opened: 1968
- Managed by: Israel Prison Service

Ofer Prison (Hebrew: כלא עופר, Kele Ofer), formerly officially known as Incarceration Facility 385 (מתקן כליאה 385), is an Israeli military incarceration facility in the Israeli-occupied West Bank, between Beitunia and Giv'at Ze'ev. It is one of three prison facilities along with Megiddo and Ktzi'ot, the latter two located in Israel and not in the West Bank. Ofer Prison is run by the Israel Prison Service and like the other two facilities, used to be operated by the Israel Defense Forces' Military Police Corps.

When under IDF control, it was capable of holding up to 800 prisoners, both tried and those under administrative detention.

NGOs have stated that the imprisonment of children is one of the human rights abuses taking place in Ofer Prison.

== History ==
Camp Ofer was founded in December 1968, at the location of a former Jordanian Army base from before the Six-Day War. It was named after lieutenant colonel Zvi Ofer, the commander of the Haruv Reconnaissance Unit, who was killed in action earlier in the same year.

The prison was built in the base in 1988, after the onset of the First Intifada. Following the Oslo Accords, and the numerous prisoner releases of 1995, Ofer's remaining prisoners and detainees were moved to Megiddo Prison, and Ofer was closed.

It was officially re-opened on March 29, 2002, as part of Operation Defensive Shield. Its full construction was set to be completed on August 10, 2002.

On October 3, 2006, control of Ofer Prison was moved to the Israel Prison Service, making it the last incarceration facility for Palestinians to be moved to the IPS (although two detention centers in the West Bank are still controlled by the Military Police Corps).

== Human rights abuses ==
Many detainees at Ofer prison have reported systematic humiliation and abuse, including beatings by guards and near-constant handcuffing, and conditions as brutal as what they had endured at Sde Teiman detention camp.

Non-governmental organizations such has Machsom Watch have reported the imprisonment of children in Ofer Prison. A delegation of British MPs visiting the facilities alleged that handcuffing children was a human rights abuse. A delegation of British lawyers who also visited the facilities observed the use of iron shackles on children, which they considered to be in breach of Article 40 of the UN Convention on the Rights of the Child and the UN Standard Minimum Rules.

=== Torture and death of Adnan al-Bursh ===
On April 19, 2024, Dr. Adnan al-Bursh, the head of orthopedics at Al-Shifa Hospital in Gaza City, died at Ofer Prison. He had been arrested by Israeli forces in the Gaza Strip. The Israeli authorities did not notify his family and refused to disclose any details about his death. Fellow prisoners who knew him and had been released said that al-Bursh appeared badly tortured and starved before his death in custody. Palestinian authorities and advocacy groups have attributed his death to torture and mistreatment in custody, with the OHCHR confirming his body showed signs of torture.

Gideon Levy wrote in Haaretz that al-Bursh was tortured and beaten to death in an Israeli jail, and that the response of the Israel Prison Service—“The service does not address the circumstances of the deaths of detainees who are not Israeli citizens.”—was pure audacity.

== Staff ==
As of 2006, Ofer Prison is staffed by the Israel Prison Service, which took control of it in 2006. The staff consists of jailors and officers, as well as a contingent of IPS's special unit, Rapid Response Unit (Keter), and interrogators from the Shabak.

Before IPS, the prison was run by the IDF's Military Police Corps. The staff included soldiers who completed the Palestinian detainees' jailors (Hebrew: מטפלי עצורי השטחים, Metaplei Atzurei HaShtahim) course, including the Company for Special Tasks (abbr. Palmam). The prison as a whole was a battalion-level unit, commanded by a lieutenant colonel.

=== Commanders ===
Ofer Prison is headed by Colonel Eran Fire.
