= Sudanese in Israel =

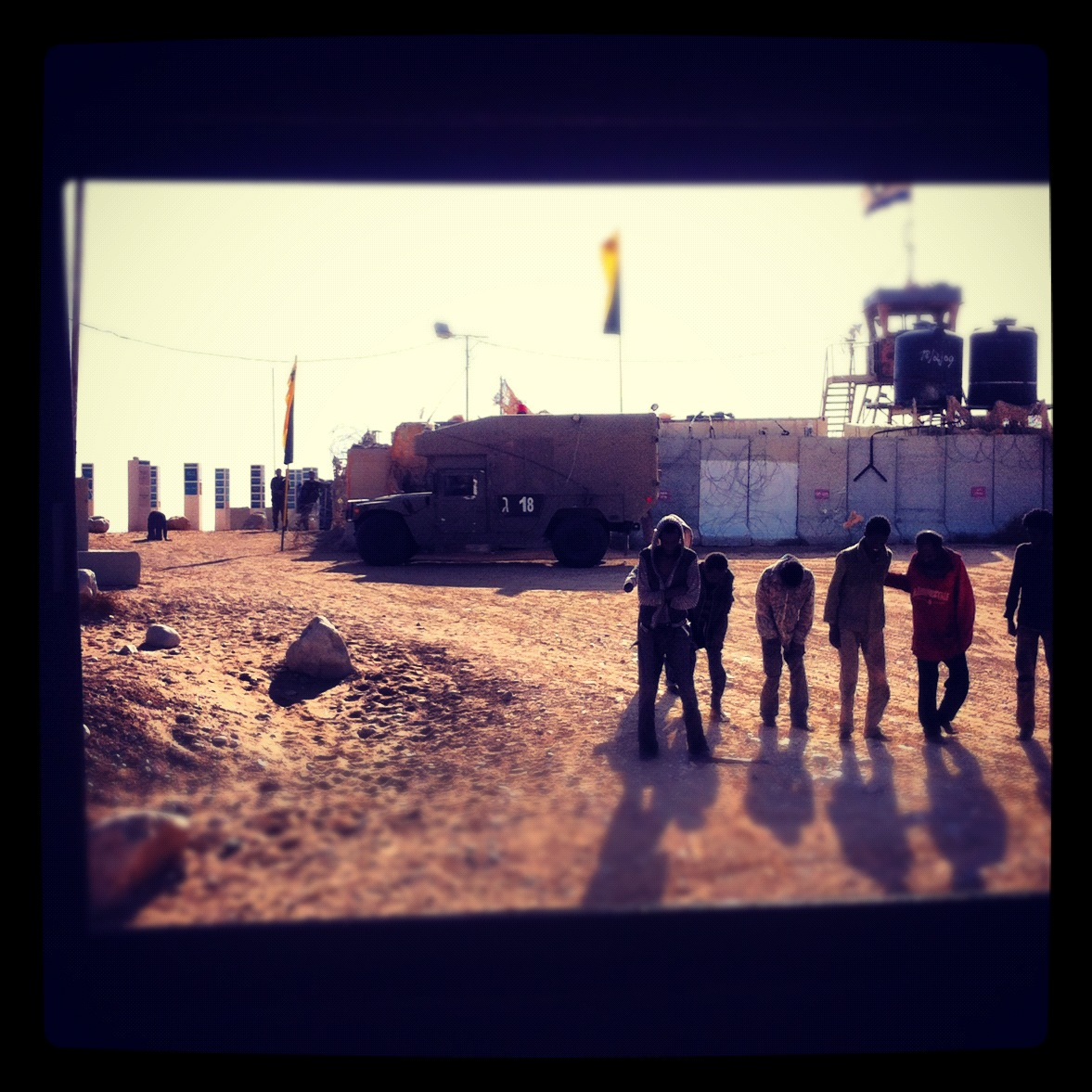
Sudanese refugees at the Egypt–Israel border, April 2012

Sudanese in Israel refers to citizens of Sudan living in Israel, who have either sought refuge due to military conflict at home, or who have moved there illegally as irregular migrants. By the early 2020s, there were an estimated 4,000 Sudanese asylum seekers in Israel. The majority entered through the Egypt–Israel border before the construction of the Egypt–Israel barrier in 2012. Most Sudanese live in urban areas like Arad, Ashdod, Bnei Brak, Eilat, Jerusalem, and Tel Aviv.

== History ==
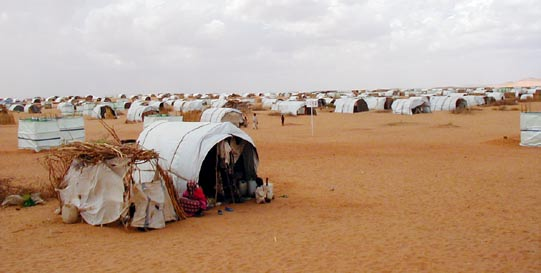
An IDP camp in Darfur

The civil wars in Sudan that have been taking place on and off since 1955, the subsequent destabilization and economic collapse caused by the country's infrastructure and economy, and the fighting in Darfur, forced millions of Sudanese civilians to flee their homes and cities. In 2006, largely owing to the extensive flow of Sudanese and Eritreans crossing into Israel by land from Egypt, Israel witnessed a significant rise in the number of asylum seekers. While in 2005 only 450 applications were registered, the number for 2008 had risen to 7,700.

Sudanese asylum seekers began arriving in Israel in increasing numbers starting around 2006. Most had initially sought refuge in Egypt after fleeing conflict in Sudan, particularly from the Darfur region and South Sudan. However, deteriorating living conditions, legal restrictions, and lack of durable solutions in Egypt prompted many to continue onward. This movement is widely described as a case of secondary or onward migration, in which refugees move from their first country of asylum in search of greater safety, legal status, or economic opportunity.

From 2006 to 2012, thousands of Sudanese and Eritrean migrants entered Israel, often facing serious dangers en route, including abuse by Sinai-based traffickers. In response, Israel introduced a series of restrictive immigration policies, including the construction of a border fence and changes to its asylum procedures, aimed at reducing unauthorized entry.

In 2012, due to a near-doubling in the flow of African seeking refugee status, Israel began building a fence along the border and publicized plans to build a detention facility for infiltrators.

In spite of the risks and abusive treatment by smugglers, smuggler networks run by Bedouin groups in the Sinai desert have transported growing numbers of Sudanese and other African asylum seekers across to Israel.

== Legal status ==
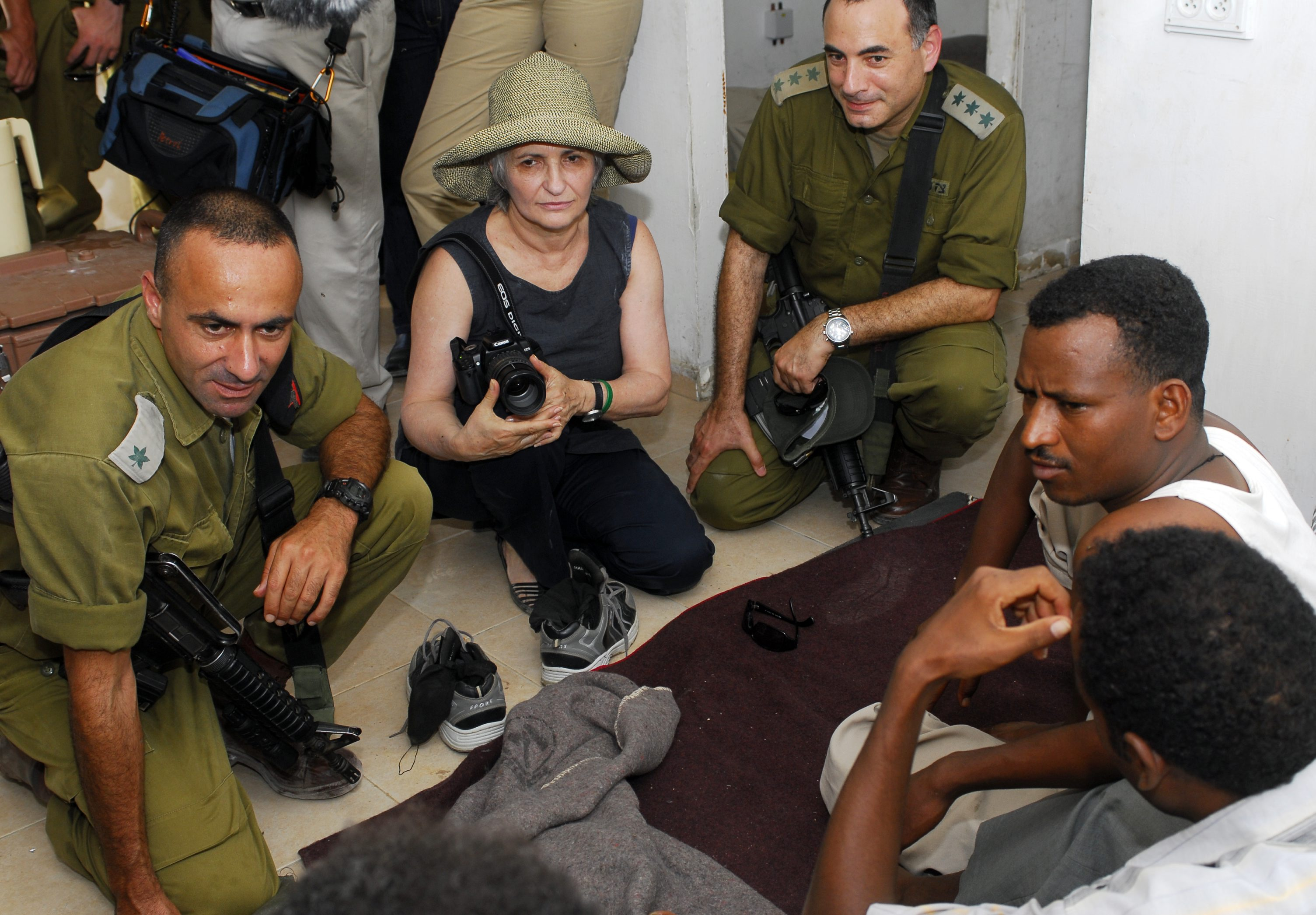
Aliza Olmert meets with Sudanese refugees

Israel supported the founding of the 1951 Convention relating to the Status of Refugees, becoming a signatory to the Convention in 1954. But although it actively participated in the development of the international refugee system, Israel did not institute the corresponding legal framework at home.

Following pressure from UNHCR, a temporary humanitarian protection arrangement was established in 1999, benefiting refugees from war-torn countries in Africa. In 2002, an Israeli asylum procedure was established with the launch of the National Status Granting Body, an inter-ministerial agency responsible for assessing asylum applications processed by UNHCR Israel, advising the minister of the interior, who held the authority on final decisions.

However, Israeli authorities did not devise and implement a clear approach towards asylum-seekers. Due to authorities' inexperience with asylum, early official responses to the new arrivals from the Egyptian border included conflicting and ad hoc policies. Finally, in July 2008, the government established the Population, Immigration, and Border Crossings Authority, responsible for processing asylum requests and determining refugee-status. In July 2009, Israeli authorities officially took over this responsibility from UNHCR, and since then asylum policies have become clearer. The Israeli have granted temporary protection, assistance, and work permits for asylum seekers, but they have also detained thousands and forced hundreds of Sudanese and other African asylum seekers to return to Egypt.

Among Sudanese refugees in Israel, 850 were asking for asylum from persecution in Sudan in 2008, including 200 children. Israel and Sudan's lack of diplomatic relations complicated the status of Sudanese asylum seekers. Since Sudan was considered by Israel as an "enemy state", many Sudanese refugees were detained according to Israeli law. But detainees were sometimes released in order to make room for new arrivals. Additionally, Sudanese have avoided detention by registering with UNHCR in Tel Aviv.

At the same time, Israeli authorities partnered with UNHCR in Israel to grant some form of temporary protection for thousands of asylum seekers, even granting them access to social services and allowing them to work. Although Israelis were legally barred from employing Sudanese asylum seekers, the ban was not enforced, as it was in the authorities' interest for asylum seekers to support themselves financially.

According to a Supreme Court of Israel decision on 13 January 2011, the employers of refugees and asylum seekers would not be fined; thus, de facto, they could legally work in Israel.

In February 2015, the government provided figures to the High Court regarding requests for asylum from Sudanese citizens. Since 2009, there were 3,165 such requests, but only 45 received a reply. Of those 45, 40 were rejected and 5 were granted temporary residency. In addition, 976 of the Sudanese asylum seekers withdrew their requests or left Israel. Only four Sudanese or Eritrean persons had been granted refugee status.

A 2020 Israeli Supreme Court ruling clarified that certain Sudanese nationals who had been granted protection under an earlier ministerial decision were in fact Convention refugees. In other cases, the State had issued humanitarian or temporary residency status to groups from Darfur, the Nuba Mountains and the Blue Nile because of the danger they face if compelled to return. Despite these developments, the overall recognition rate for refugee status in Israel remains among the lowest in the developed world, with the vast majority of Sudanese asylum applications either unresolved for years or rejected.

== Reactions in Israel ==
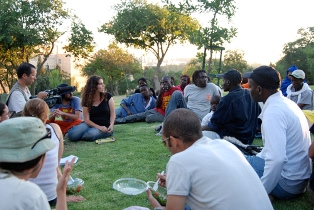
Israeli students meeting between Sudanese refugees, 2007

There is a mixed reaction in Israel: Large protests have been organized mainly by citizens of neighborhoods in South Tel Aviv who claim that their safety and life quality was ruined by the presence of illegal immigrants from Sudan and Eritrea. Also, there have been demonstrations in support of the refugees.

In recent years, the Israeli government and the UN Refugee Agency have entered cooperative discussions on solutions for Eritrean and Sudanese asylum seekers, including resettlement options and programmes aimed at expanding legal pathways.

== Recent trends ==
As of 2024, around 7,000 Sudanese asylum seekers and migrants live in Israel as part of the broader African asylum-seeker population, constituting approximately 15% of the 22,000 Africans under temporary protection in the country. Most arrived prior to 2012, before Israel's border barrier largely halted irregular entries from Egypt. These individuals generally lack full refugee status, with limited access to employment rights and public health insurance.

In January 2024 an Israeli district court ruled that about 1,000 Sudanese asylum seekers should be granted temporary residency, entitling them to basic social rights and healthcare while their individual refugee claims are considered. The judgment requires the Ministry of Interior to issue residency within ninety days.

Advocacy groups report ongoing challenges, including detention and attempted pushbacks of Sudanese families entering through Jordan in 2023.

Following Sudan's move toward normalizing diplomatic ties with Israel in 2020, many asylum seekers have feared possible deportation, as normalization features among issues discussed by both governments. Although no mass deportations have been carried out, political rhetoric and leadership changes - including Interior Minister Ayelet Shaked's expressed opposition to African asylum seekers - have heightened uncertainty about long-term status for Sudanese.

== See also ==
- Refugees of Sudan
- Illegal immigration from Africa to Israel
- Sudanese refugees in Egypt
- Sudanese refugees in Chad
- Refugee § African refugees in Israel
- International response to the War in Darfur
- Refugee kidnappings in Sinai
- Usumain Baraka
