= African Refugees Development Center =

The African Refugee Development Center (ARDC), founded in 2004, is a non-governmental organization founded by African asylum seekers and Israeli citizens in order to assist African asylum seekers in Israel. Its goals include:

- Promote humane, fair and effective policies on the reception, protection and integration of asylum-seekers and refugees in Israel;
- Assist refugees and asylum-seekers towards self-sufficiency as independent, productive and contributing members of society;
- Facilitate the participation and empowerment of refugees and asylum seekers through their inclusion in education possibilities, the labor market, and health care;
- Empower local refugee communities through assisting in the development of training and capacity building programs, social and cultural activities, and refugee participation in civic decision-making processes as well as in general Israeli life.

In early 2007, the ARDC started to work towards a solution to the growing need for accommodation, humanitarian aid, and case management for newly arriving refugees and asylum seekers into Israel. The ARDC began to operate emergency shelters for new arrivals.

== See also ==
- Demographics of Israel
- Demographic threat (Israel)
