= Kav LaOved =

Israeli non-profit association protecting workers' rights

Kav La'Oved
- קו לעובד
- Formation: 1991; 35 years ago
- Founder: Hannah Zohar
- Founded at: Israel
- Purpose: Protecting the rights of disadvantaged workers
- Location: Israel
- Affiliations: Association for Civil Rights in Israel, Hotline for Refugees and Migrants, Physicians for Human Rights

Kav La'Oved (Hebrew: קו לעובד "Worker's Hotline") is an Israeli non-profit association, founded in 1991. Its objective is to protect the rights of disadvantaged workers. It provides information, advice, and legal representation for the most deprived workers in Israel – migrant workers, Palestinian workers and Israeli low-wage earners.

== Activities ==
Kav LaOved has four main branches in Israel (Tel-Aviv, Haifa, Jerusalem, and Beersheba) and two extensions in the Palestinian Authority (offices in Qalqiliya) and Jericho, plus area coordinators for Palestinian workers employed in Israeli settlements in the West Bank). The organization has several staffers and dozens of volunteers who regularly work and provide individual help, collect information, and document the condition of disadvantaged workers in Israel. Ms. Hannah Zohar founded Kav LaOved and has served as its manager since then.

There are four aspects to the organization's efforts - the individual, public, education & advocacy, and civic enforcement aspects.

Individual – providing advice and legal representation for low-wage workers. Legal aid includes help on issues of Labour laws, Tax laws, National Insurance issues, Legal status in Israel, and arranging Work permits.

Public - Kav LaOved applies the substantial know-how and experience its staff has acquired in individual cases to work towards societal change. It does so by filing principled petitions to the courts, drawing up draft bills, and working vis-à-vis the Knesset (Israel's parliament), government offices and the media. The organization identifies and indicates phenomena and mechanisms of exploitation that disempower workers. With other organizations, Kav LaOved strives to amend laws and regulations and to introduce improvements in law-enforcement agencies.

Education & Advocacy – Raising awareness to worker rights, among others by writing and issuing mini-notebooks that list basic rights. The notebooks are printed in several languages, and their contents are featured on internet sites, in leaflets, and reports. Workshops for workers and lectures for the general public are also given.

Civic Enforcement – Working to protect worker rights by using enforcement mechanisms of state authorities, instead of turning to the courts. The term civic enforcement relates to alternative mechanisms: these include "naming and shaming" employers who violate worker rights, and encouraging workers and consumers to avoid associating with such employers. Kav LaOved documents complaints and rulings against employers and personnel contractors: it uses legal means to publish the names of employers and companies whose business operations have been defined by the authorities as flawed.

Kav LaOved operates in tandem with other non-government organizations (NGOs) such as Association for Civil Rights in Israel, Hotline for Refugees and Migrants, and Physicians for Human Rights – to change policy on matters of principle. Among others, the association is involved in the Forum for Enforcement of Worker Rights which focuses on the rights of contract-workers, in the Mandatory Pension Coalition, the Migrant Workers Forum, and in a joint project with some branches of the Palestine General Federation of Trade Unions (PGFTU).

Kav LaOved is funded by donations from foundations and private donors.

== Awards and prizes ==
- 1998 – Kav LaOved was given the Emil Grunzweig Human Rights Award, an annual award by the Association for Civil Rights in Israel to "an individual or NGO that has made a unique contribution to the advancement of human rights in Israel", for its work for the rights of migrant workers in Israel.
- 2003 – The Knesset Speaker's Award for endeavours strengthening democracy.
- 2004 – Hannah Zohar was named by the Globes newspaper as one of Israel's 50 most positively influential women.
- 2006 – Kav LaOved won the Silver Rose award, granted by Solidar – an independent international alliance of NGOs – for its efforts in the field of workers rights.
- 2007 – Hannah Zohar was chosen by Israeli newspaper The Marker as one of the 40 women at the forefront of social endeavours in Israel.
- 2007 – Hannah Zohar, the founder and director of Kav LaOved, received the New Israel Foundation's Human Rights Award.

== Achievements ==
- A successful petition to Israel's Supreme Court against binding migrant workers to their employers. Kav LaOved appealed jointly with other NGOs (The Association for Civil Rights in Israel, The Hotline for Migrant Workers, Physicias for Human Rights, The Adva Center, Mehuyavut – Commitment for Peace and Social Jusicey, and Tel-Aviv University's Human Rights Legal Clinic).
- An amendment to the National Insurance law obligating National Insurance to pay wage-replacement pension (e.g. maternity leave, payments for reserve military service) in an amount not less than the minimum wage – even if the employer paid its workers less, and set less aside to the National Insurance (the amendment covers all workers in all sectors)
- Direct payment of pensions to Palestinian workers by the Payments Section of the Employment Service. This replaces the previous method, where the pensions were redeemed by attorneys who charged the workers unnecessary fees.
- Reinstatement of the tax credit points for migrant workers, revoked in January 2007.
- Under a government decision from August 2007 Israel will now sign bilateral agreements with all countries of origin of migrant workers. The agreements will stipulate, among others, the reducing of brokerage fees paid by migrant workers coming to Israel. The decision reflected a 180-degree change from the Foreign Ministry's previously stated opinion on the matter (that Israel would not sign bilateral agreements concerning migrant workers). It is the direct outcome of Kav LaOved's petitioning of the High Court.
- In September 2007, the Justice Ministry's Commission for Licensing Private Investigators and Security Companies announced that it was making the annual licence-renewal of all security companies conditional on their paying pensions and other social benefits to their workers.
- In October 2007, Israel's Supreme Court, sitting as the High Court of Justice in a panel of nine judges, unanimously adopted a petition by Kav LaOved, and ruled that Israeli laws must apply to Palestinians working in West Bank settlements.
- Significantly increased awareness among low-earning workers about their rights, following massive information campaigns.
