= Ktzi'ot Prison =

Detention facility in Israel

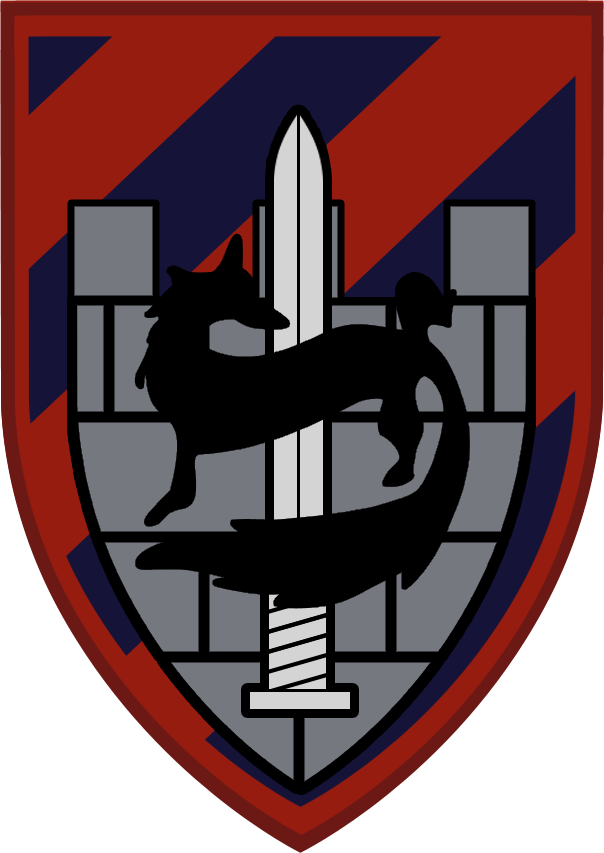
- Logo of the facility

- Location within Israel
- Location: Auja; 30°53′27.44″N 34°28′31.74″E
- Opened: 1988
- Managed by: Israel Prison Service

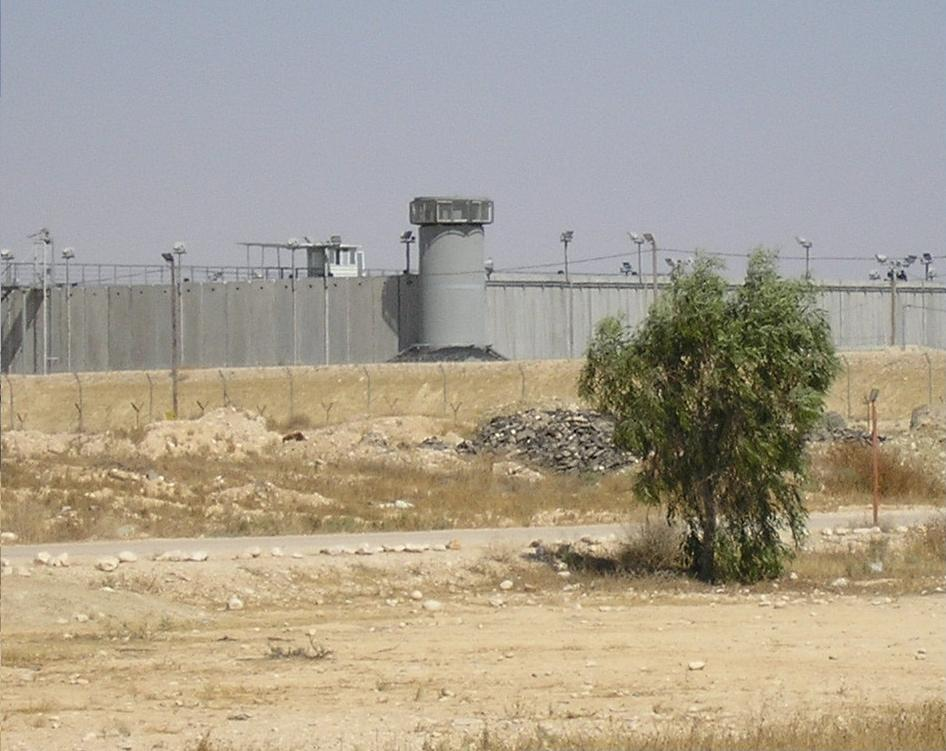
The exterior of the prison facility in 2007

Ktzi'ot Prison (Hebrew: בית הסוהר קציעות, romanized: Bet HaSohar Ketziot, Arabic: سجن كتسيعوت, romanized: Sijn Katsīʿōt) is an Israeli detention facility located in the Negev desert 72 kilometres (45 mi) southwest of Beersheba. It is Israel's largest detention facility in terms of land area, encompassing 400,000 m^{2} (40 hectares; 99 acres).

During the First Intifada, Ktzi'ot was the location of the largest detention camp run by the Israeli army. It held three-quarters of all Palestinians held by the army, and over half of all Palestinians detained in Israel. According to Human Rights Watch, in 1990 it held approximately one out of every 50 West Bank and Gazan males older than 16. Amongst Palestinians it was known as Ansar III (Arabic: أنصار3) after a similar prison camp set up in South Lebanon by Israel during the South Lebanon conflict (1982–2000). Ktzi'ot camp was opened in March 1988 and closed in 1995. It was re-opened in 2002 during the Second Intifada.

== Background: Nahal camp (1953) to Six-Day War ==
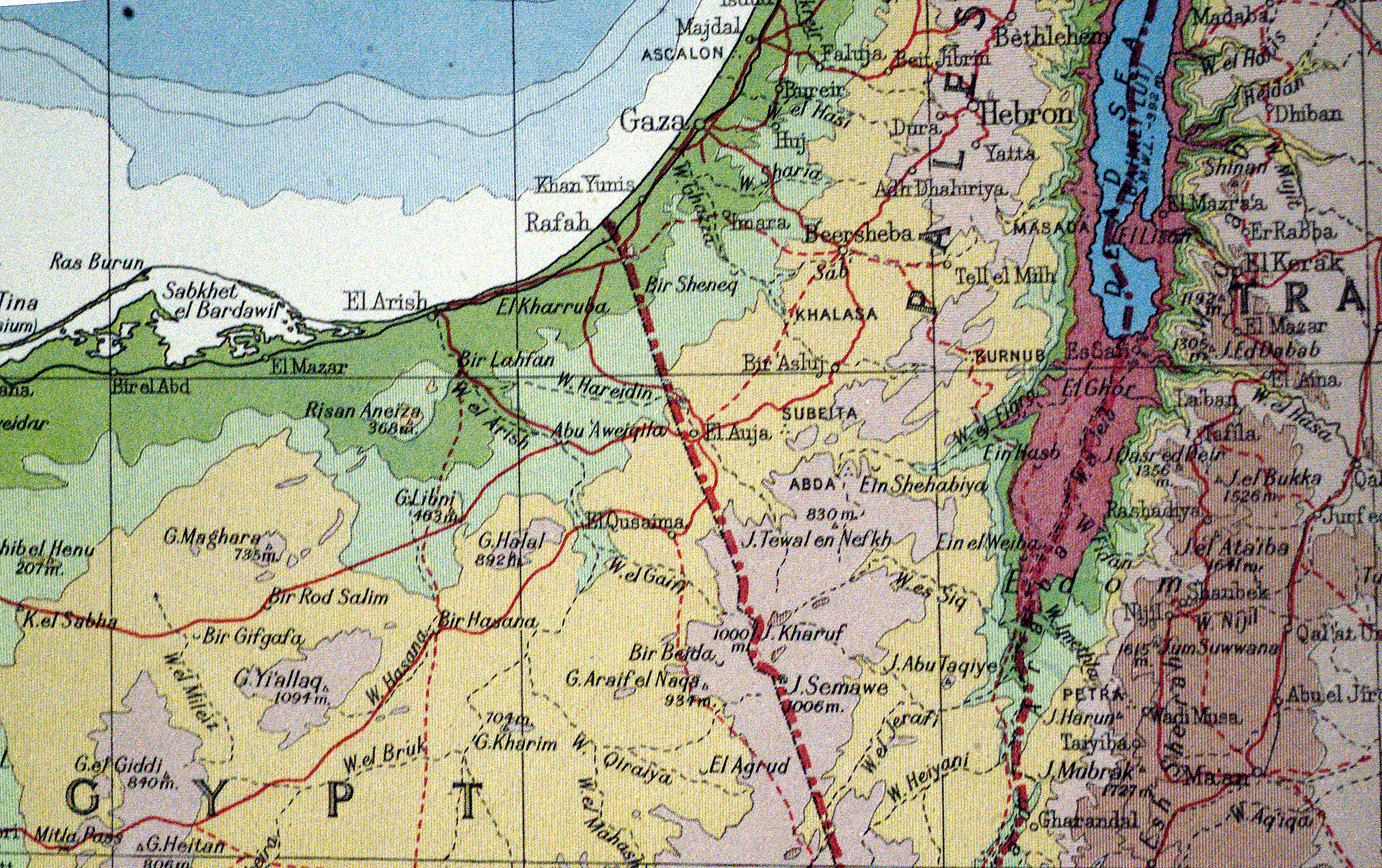
Pre-1939 map showing how Al Auja junction controlled the paved road from Palestine into Egypt

On September 28, 1953 the Israel Defense Forces established a fortified settlement, Ktzi'ot, overlooking the al-Auja junction. Despite housing soldiers in civilian clothes and engaging in little farming activity the Israelis maintained it was a pioneering farm settlement which did not break the Egyptian-Israeli Armistice Agreement relating to the 145 km^{2} Demilitarized Zone (DMZ) around al-Auja. The remaining members of the 'Azazme tribe, who depended on the well at al-Auja, were attacked and driven across the border into Egypt.

On October 6, 1954 a member of the Ktzi'ot kibbutz drove a water truck across the border into Egypt and gave himself up to the Egyptians at Abu Aweigila. When questioned in the presence of a UN military observer he said that all the inhabitants of the kibbutz were soldiers: one captain, four NCOs, 65 men soldiers and fifteen women soldiers. They were armed with rifles, sub machine guns, light machine guns, mortars and anti-tank weapons.

In early 1956, prior to Israel taking full control of the al-Auja DMZ, Ktzi'ot included twelve squad tents and had a small runway with light aircraft visiting almost daily. Later that year the DMZ was used as the point of entry for the IDF invasion of the Sinai Peninsula. It served the same function in 1967, during the Six-Day War.

== First Intifada (1987-1993) ==
On March 18, 1988, around 700 prisoners were transferred from prisons in the Gaza Strip to the newly prepared prison camp. Four days later, Defense Minister Yitzhak Rabin announced that 3,000 Palestinians were under arrest and that a new prison had been opened in the Negev desert.

Three weeks later the Palestinian Human Rights group al-Haq quoted a Gaza lawyer, Raji Surani, as describing conditions in the camp as "harsh and inhuman".

In July 1989 the Israeli newspaper Davar reported that 4,275 prisoners were being held at Ktzi'ot. Most of the 4,215 Administrative detention prisoners from the West Bank and Gaza Strip were being held there. All prisoners were living in 24-man tents. Prisoners and lawyers reported absence of privacy during meetings and that newspapers were being censored. There was a list of 26 permitted books. According to the army, as of June 1989, six prisoners had been killed by fellow inmates accused of collaborating or 'immoral activity'.

=== Conditions in 1991 ===
Members of Human Rights Watch (HRW) visited the camp in August 1990. It was under the command of Colonel Ze'ev Shaltiel and held 6,216 prisoners. The camp was divided into sections. Each section contained two or more tents and was surrounded by ridges of sand and gravel blocking visibility between sections. The tents, each 50 square meters in size, contained 20–30 men each. Prisoners were confined to the tents for most of the day with three daily counts. In addition, there was a section surrounded by 3-meter walls and divided into subsections covered in steel netting. There was also a building containing four 3x3 meter punishment cells which, at the time of the HRW visit contained 23 prisoners.

The HRW report concluded that the camp was "in clear violation of the IV Geneva Convention forbidding the transfer of incarcerated persons from occupied territories to the territory of the occupying power."

It also found that:

- Access between lawyers and their clients was very restricted. Meetings took place in the open across a double fence. No documents were allowed to be exchanged. A maximum of 20 lawyers were allowed daily, each lawyer restricted to meeting 15–20 prisoners. Meetings were limited to 15 minutes.
- Prisoners in tents were exposed to extreme weather conditions.
- There were no family visits.
- Mail was backlogged and heavily censored. The camp had only four censors.
- Few books were allowed into the camp. Rejected books included The Lord of the Rings, Hamlet, The Cancer Ward, a biography of Tolstoy and a book on constitutional law in Hebrew.
- Group sports were prohibited.

The report recorded a number of violent incidents. A few weeks before their visit deputy commander, Major Avi Chasa'i, ordered the firing of tear gas into one of the sections after prisoners refused to stop praying outside their tent. Shortly after the camp was opened, on August 16, 1988, two inmates were shot dead in a riot involving 1,000 prisoners. The camp commander at the time, Colonel David Tsemach, fired the shots that killed at least one of the victims. He was cleared of wrongdoing by an army investigation headed by Colonel Mordechai Peled.

At the time of the HRW visit, 3,802 of the prisoners had been sentenced; 1,442 were Gazans under trial or awaiting trial. There were 877 administrative detainees. Gazan prisoners were kept separate from those from their West Bank counterparts.

Up to the time of the visit, 21 prisoners had been killed by fellow prisoners, accused of being collaborators.

The Israeli human rights organization B'Tselem visited Kt'zi'ot prison May 30, 1991 and February 20, 1992. On their first visit there were 6,049 prisoners of whom 710 were administrative detainees; nine months later there were 5,080 prisoners with 250 being administrative detainees.

The report comments that the first reaction of visitors to the prison is one of shock: its large size, one of the largest prisons in the world, and its makeshift appearance; the loudspeakers broadcasting the Arabic station of "Kol Yisrael"; the smell of fuel oil. Conditions were very much harsher than in other Israeli prisons. The report suggests that this was due to the military's lack of experience and that the camp was regarded as temporary. It was noted that the Commander, Ze'ev Shaltiel, broke judicial rulings and was using solitary confinement as a means of punishing prisoners. Some prisoners were being held in isolation for longer than the two weeks maximum stipulated.

The report describes the camp as being divided into 60m x 60m plots patrolled by armed soldiers. The plots contained two to four tents, each holding 20–26 individuals. The tents had no furniture except one bed per prisoner. There was no privacy for prisoners. In summer the temperature rose above 40 degrees, in winter it could fall below freezing. The tents flooded when it rained. Each plot had three or four half-barrels for garbage, which overflowed causing smell and health problems. Mosquitoes abounded. The only medical help was from physicians on reserve duty doing a one-month tour of duty. There were many cases of skin diseases. Other issues raised included: – prisoners forbidden to wear watches. – no radio or TV. – no access to outside physicians. – no laundry. – studying forbidden. – two hours of volleyball were allowed a day, but only for ten prisoners at a time.

Up to B'Tselem's 1992 visit 28 prisoners had been killed by their fellow inmates.

The report states that "conditions in the facility were illegal and inhuman" and described the solitary confinement area as "human chicken coops." B'Tselem called for the entire camp to be closed down. The 1992 visit was the last time the human rights group was allowed to see inside any Israeli prison.

== Reopening in 2002 ==
According to information gathered by Defence for Children International (DCI), the prison reopened in April 2002. It consisted of four sections made up of four units, with another half section opened in October 2002. Each unit was surrounded by a five-meter wall and contained three tents. The tents were designed for under twenty men but usually contained more. Each unit had three toilets and was issued with one liter of chlorine every 20 days.

According to DCI, the main problems were:

- Lack of family visits
- Overcrowding
- Poor food
- No supplied clothing
- Attacks and theft by guards
- No medical care
- Exposed to harsh weather
- No child-specific procedures for those aged 16 and 17
- No educational material
- Rodents

The prison, up to 2003, contained around 1,000 prisoners, mostly administrative detainees and including 30–60 boys under 18 years.

The ICRC visited "Qetziot military detention camp" twice in 2005, and twice in 2006.

Ktzi'ot prison is currently run by the Israel Prison Service. Its security systems were installed by G4S Israel (Hashmira).

In 2010 plans were put forward to construct a large detention center at Ktzi'ot for illegal immigrants. The border between Israel and Egypt has been used as a crossing point for economic migrants and asylum seekers; it is estimated that two-thirds come from Eritrea and one third from Sudan.

Construction of a crocodile-filled moat around the prison began in July 2026 following a decision by Environmental Protection Minister Idit Silman to reclassify the Nile crocodile as a "cultivated wild animal" to allow the Israel Prison Service to station crocodiles around prisons. Construction of the moat was paused in August 2026 after a temporary injunction by an Israeli court. When faced with criticism from ecologists, Silman stated that the crocodiles in the moat would be treated better than the Palestinian prisoners.

== Violence ==
In 2019, steps were taken to tighten the conditions of security prisoners in prison, according to a plan outlined by Minister Gilad Erdan. The measures included sanctions, a change in the status quo and a disruption of cell phone reception, which the prisoners managed to smuggle into prisons. On March 24, 2019, in response to these measures, one of the inmates at Ketziot Prison stabbed two guards, seriously injuring one of them. After the two guards were evacuated to a hospital, other guards, with the special force of a takeover unit on its part and a Keter unit, broke into the Hamas prisoners' wing of the prison. Documentation from security cameras shows the guards attacking prisoners with punches, batons and kicks, without provocation on their part.

In 2021, video footage emerged in which dozens of Palestinian security prisoners were first restrained and then forcibly thrown onto a concrete floor, sometimes on top of each other, as guards passed between them with batons and kicking them randomly. 15 prisoners were injured and left restrained for hours. The Prison Service described the incident as gaining control over a riot.” According to a lead editorial in Haaretz, “the evidence clearly shows there was no riot, just the abuse of prisoners.“ Despite the video footage, the police failed to identify all the officers in the wing that night. Only four were briefly questioned, and no perpetrators were arrested. Although the prisoners declared they could identify the perpetrators, no lineup was conducted. The authorities decided to close their investigation. An attorney for the Israeli human-rights organization Hamoked said: “The incident at Ketziont is a case of brute, wholesale violence against tied, helpless people. The investigative authorities’ attempt to shirk responsibility, despite the security camera footage, is a badge of shame for the national unit for investigating corrections officers and investigative bodies in general. When that’s the reality, it’s no wonder that the violence of security forces toward Palestinians is so common when that’s how they handle complaints.”

In December 2023, an investigation was launched into over a dozen guards at the prison, suspected of beating to death a 38-year-old prisoner.

In August 2024, B'Tselem, an Israeli human rights NGO, released a report detailing testimonies of 55 Palestinians held in Israeli custody since October 7, 2023, including 12 Palestinians held in the Ktzi'ot prison. This report described a lack of food and water, severe beating, and sexual abuse.

== See also ==
- Palestinian prisoners in Israel
- Saharonim detention centre
- Camp 1391
- Sde Teiman detention camp
