= Saharonim Prison =

Israeli detention facility

Coordinates: 30.8853°N 34.4530°E

The Saharonim Prison was an Israeli detention facility for African asylum seekers located in the Negev desert. It is the largest of a planned four camps with its total capacity of 8,000 inmates. Together with the Ktzi'ot prison, Sadot prison and the Nachal Raviv tent camp they detain South Sudanese, Sudanese and Eritrean asylum seekers who crossed the border from Egypt to Israel.

Since 2010 provisions were made to detain the immigrants in the old Ktzi'ot Prison, formally used as a detention camp for Palestinians.

On January 10, 2012 the Israeli parliament (Knesset) voted a controversial amendment bill to the 1954 Prevention of Infiltration Law that made detention for up to three years possible for African immigrants, without trial. In the spring of 2012 the construction of the Saharonim Prison was started, exempt from most local and national regulations, as requested by the Israeli Defense Ministry.

The facility closed in May 2020 due to a low number of detainees, the few remaining detainees were left where transferred to Givon Prison.

== Location ==
The prison is located in the southern Negev desert, close to the Israeli-Egyptian border. The region is known for its harsh living conditions both in summer as in winter.

== Controversies ==
On June 24, 2013 a hunger strike was started by 350 mostly Eritrean detainees in blocks 3 and 4 of the prison. In a letter by one of the hunger strikers that was published in Hebrew, described their encounter with immigration authority officers during the hunger strike:

We were prosecuted and victimized in our country and we didn’t have democracy. We were not able to live in peace. Many among us were tortured and raped in Sinai. When we reached this democratic state of Israel, we didn’t expect such harsh punishment in prison and we still don’t know which crime it is that makes us suffer for such a long time in this prison.

As of September 2013 there were around 1,800 refugees imprisoned, 1,400 of them in Saharonim and 400 in Ktziot.

In September 2013 the Supreme Court of Israel ruled that imprisoning African migrants for long periods is unconstitutional.

The court also ruled that migrants, refugees and asylum seekers detained in the Ktziot and Saharonim prisons should be released within 90 days and those that cross the border illegally can only be detained for one year in the future. The Israeli government has responded by passing an amended law to reduce the period of detention to one year and proposed the indefinite detention in "open" detention centers without judicial review.

As of January 2014, some 2,500 asylum seekers were housed at Saharonim and Ktziot prisons, 41 of them are children imprisoned with their parents. Of these, 15 are infants and toddlers up to the age of two, and 26 are children up to the age of 10.

In 2018, seven Eritrean asylum seekers who refused deportation to Rwanda were brought to Saharonim Prison, after the israeli interior ministry gave them a choice between indefinite detention and deportation. In response, 750 asylum seekers detained at the adjacent Holot Open Detention Center in the Negev began a hunger strike, refusing both food and water, said Abdat Ishmail, a de facto spokesman for the Eritrean asylum seekers in Holot.

Between October 1 and October 2, 2025, a group of activists from around the world formed the Global Sumud Flotilla that traveled to Gaza with the aim of breaking the Israeli blockade of the Gaza strip, but they were arrested by the Israeli Navy in international waters and were taken to this detention center.

== See also ==
- Sudanese refugees in Israel
- Illegal immigration from Africa to Israel
