= Egypt–Israel barrier =

Barrier built by Israel along its border with Egypt

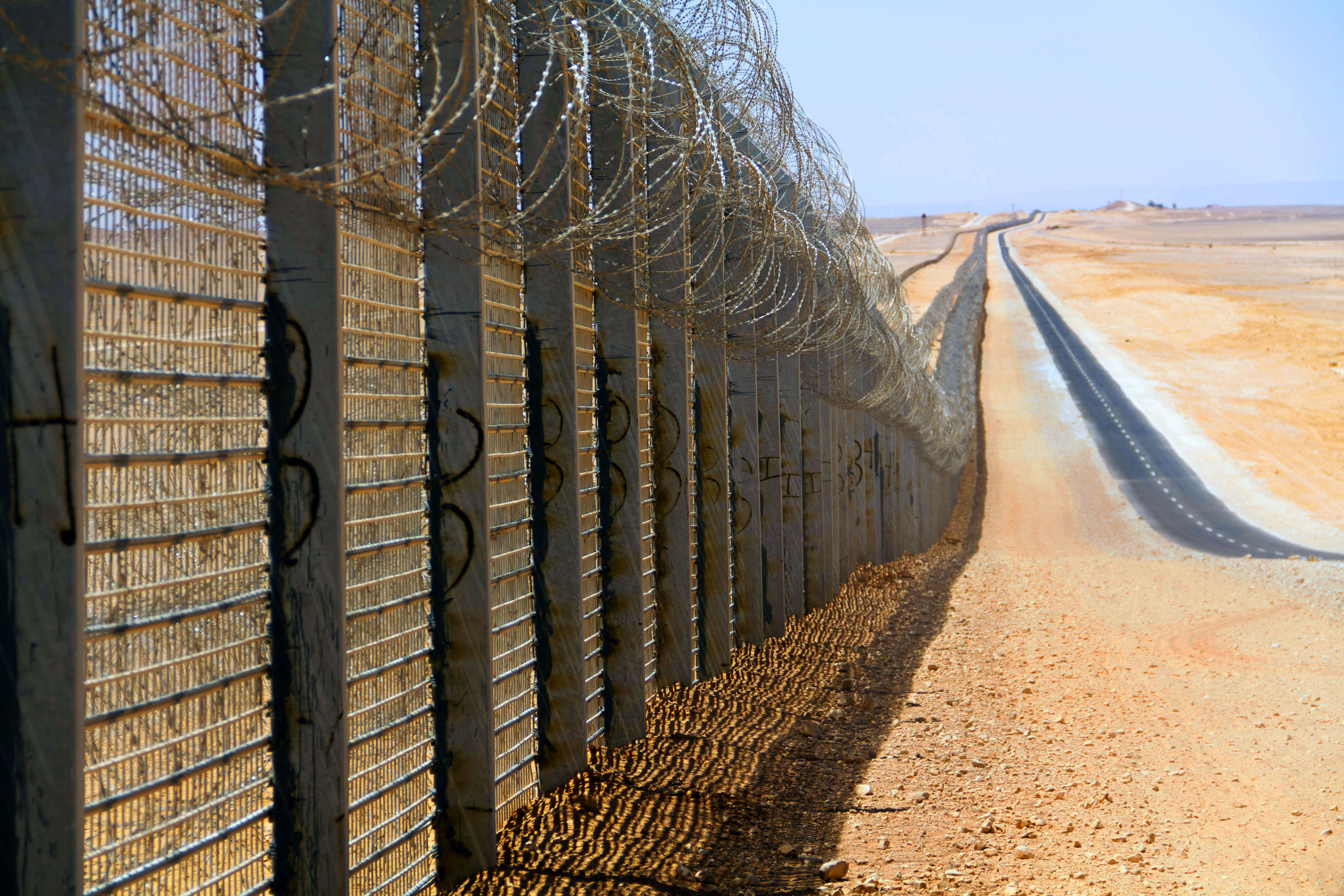
Post-upgrade section of fencing north of Eilat, 2012

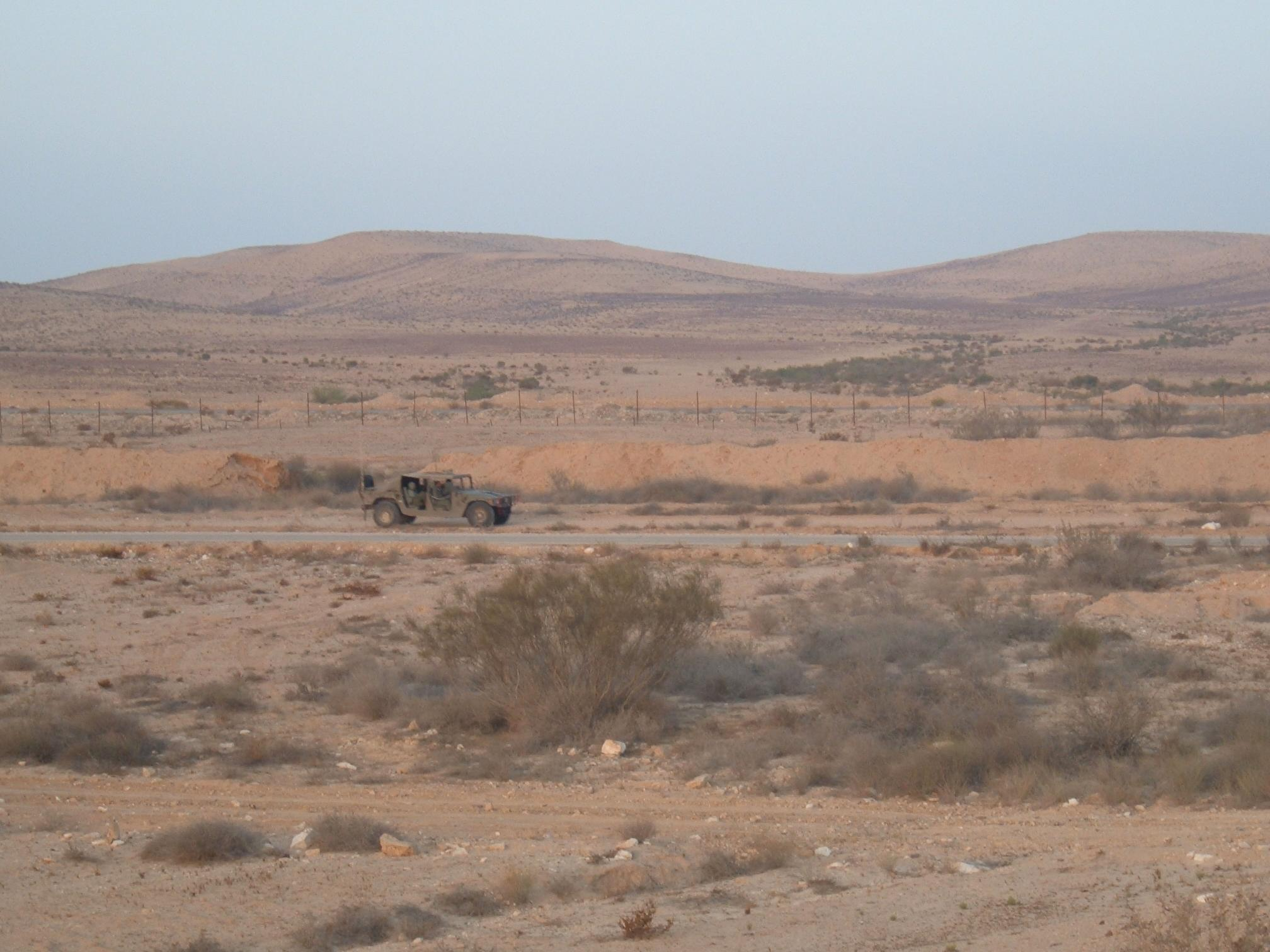
Pre-upgrade Israeli border fence with Egypt near Nitzana, 2007

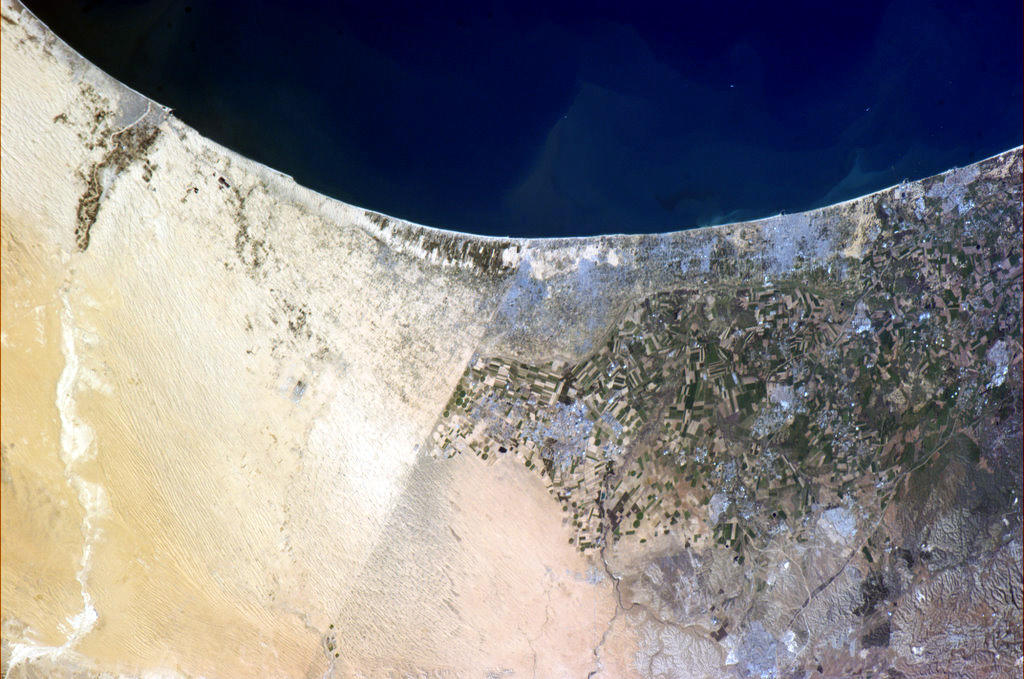
International Space Station satellite imagery of the border between Egypt (left) and Israel (right) with the Gaza Strip at its northern end. The city of Rafah, split by the border into an Egyptian part and a Palestinian part since 1982, is located at the centre of the image. The difference in the shades of the terrain in uncultivated areas is the result of overgrazing on the Egyptian side of the border.

The Egypt–Israel barrier or Egypt–Israel border fence (Hebrew: שְׁעוֹן הַחוֹל, romanized: Sheʽon HaḤol, lit. 'sand clock') refers to a separation barrier built by Israel along its border with Egypt. Initial construction on the barrier began on 22 November 2010, and its original purpose as a common fence was to curb the large influx of illegal migrants from African countries into Israel. However, in the wake of the Egyptian Crisis after the 2011 Revolution, Israel's southwestern border with Egypt experienced an increase in militant jihadist activity with the outbreak of the Sinai insurgency. In response, Israel upgraded the steel barrier—called Project Hourglass by the Israel Defense Forces (IDF)—to include cameras, radars, and motion detectors. In January 2013, construction on the barrier's main section was completed; the final section was completed in December 2013.

A number of countries, including the United States and India, have sent delegations to Israel to observe its border-controlling capabilities and the various technologies used by the IDF to secure Israel's boundaries against the Arab states. Some of these countries have expressed an interest in implementing Israeli strategies and technologies with their own border fences; the Trump administration cited Israel's border strategies as inspiration for the barrier built by the United States along its border with Mexico, while Indian officials have discussed the implementation of an "Israel-type model" for the barrier built by India along its border with Pakistan.

The 245-kilometre (152 mi) barrier, stretching from the Israeli city of Eilat in the south to the Gaza–Israel border in the north, took three years to construct at an estimated cost of ₪1.6 billion (US$450 million), making it one of the largest projects in Israel's history.

== Background ==
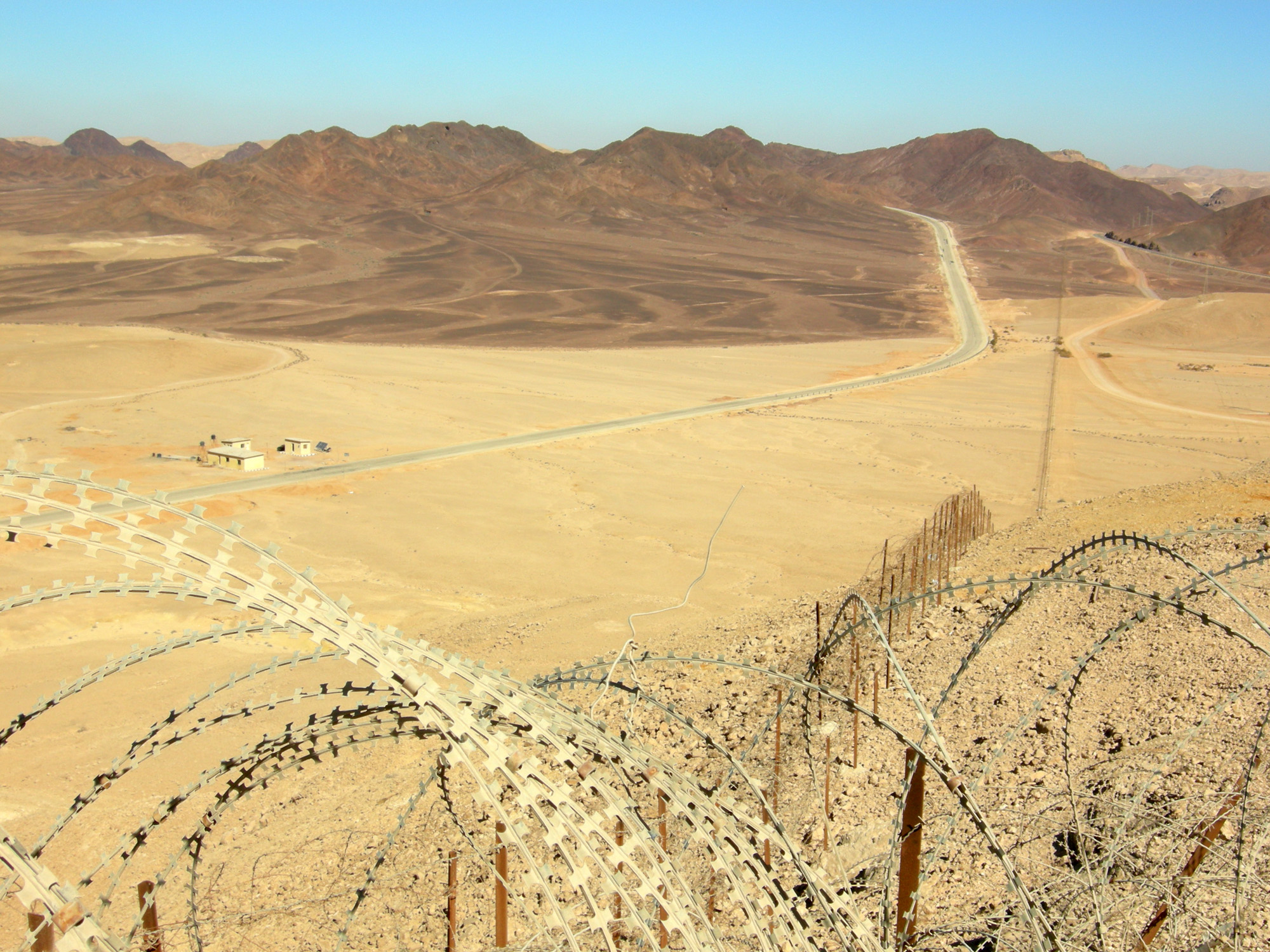
Pre-upgrade border fence section north of Eilat, 2008

An old and rusty low-height fence swamped by shifting sand dunes, which mainly served as a border marker between Egypt's Sinai Peninsula and Israel, had already existed in the Negev Desert prior to any barrier considerations. The smuggling of cigarettes as well as drugs by Bedouins whose tribal lands straddle the Egypt–Israel border had been a long-term but low-level problem. However, armed infiltrations by Arab militants into Israel along the porous border led to Israeli calls for the construction of a security fence by December 2005; the Israeli government decided to build the barrier in the late 2000s, in light of mass illegal African immigration.

== Purpose ==
The separation barrier was originally planned in response to the high levels of illegal African migrants, mainly from Eritrea and Sudan, who were being smuggled into Israel by Bedouin traffickers. Tens of thousands of people attempted to cross from Egypt's Sinai Peninsula into Israel every year, predominantly economic migrants. During Hosni Mubarak's regime, Egyptian border guards sometimes shot African migrants who were trying to enter Israel illegally. Israeli prime minister Benjamin Netanyahu stated that the barrier is meant to "secure Israel's Jewish and democratic character." The 2011 Egyptian revolution, the demise of Mubarak's regime, increased lawlessness and a rising Islamist insurgency in the Sinai, as well as the 2011 southern Israel cross-border attacks led to the project's upgrading with surveillance equipment and its timetable for completion being expedited.

== Construction ==
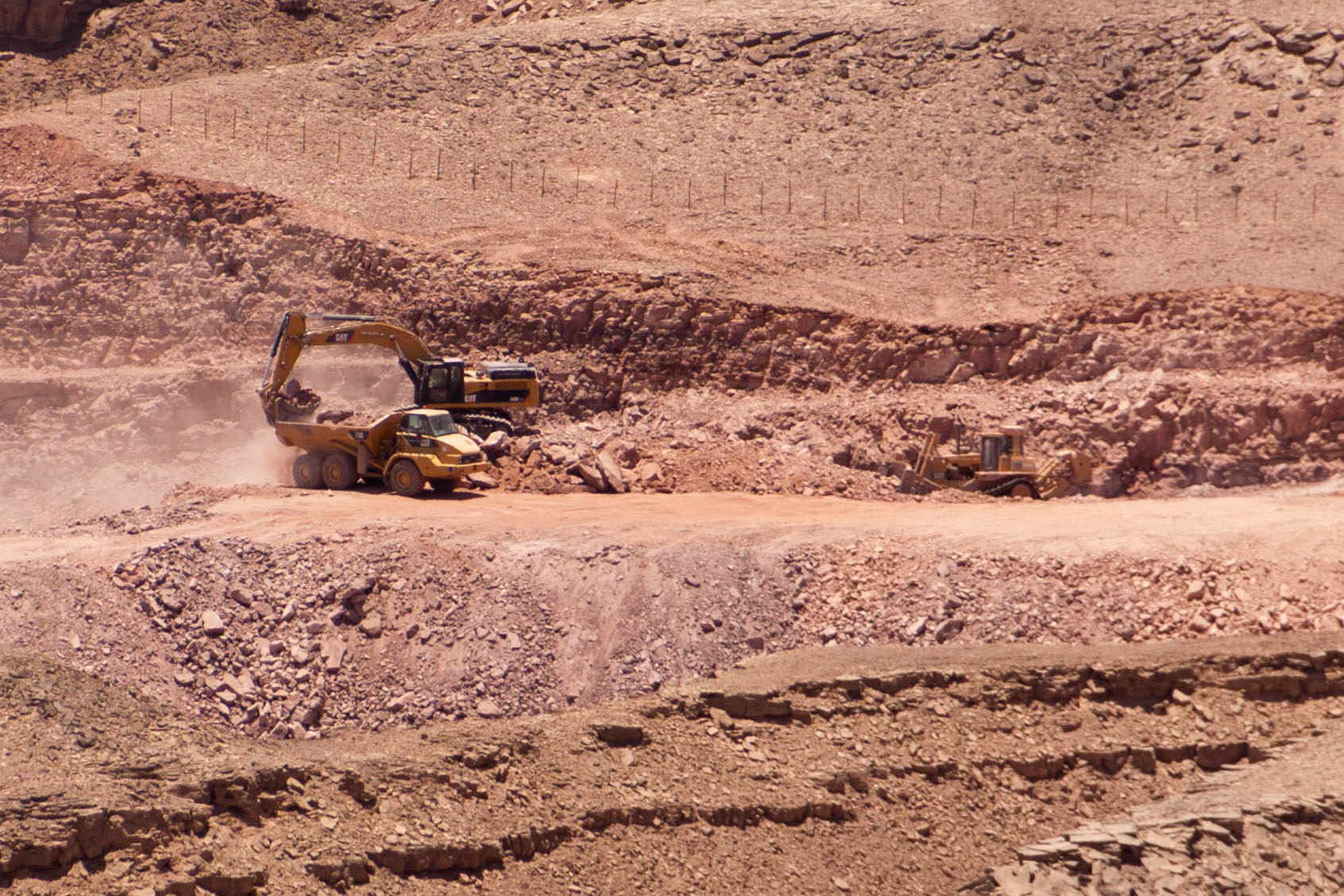
Under-construction barrier section in the Eilat Mountains during the upgrade project, June 2012

The fence has two layers of fencing, one with barbed wire. The structure includes the installation of advanced surveillance equipment. Eventually the whole border will be sealed. The estimated cost of the project is NIS1.6 billion ($450 million).

In March 2012, nearly 105 km (65 miles) of fence had been built by 30 contractors working concurrently and building several hundred meters (yards) of the fence every day. The goal was to finish the remaining 135 km (84 miles), including those running through the mountainous area of Sinai, in 2012. Construction of the main section 230 km (143 miles) was completed in January 2013. The project was completed in December 2013.

== Effects on illegal entry ==
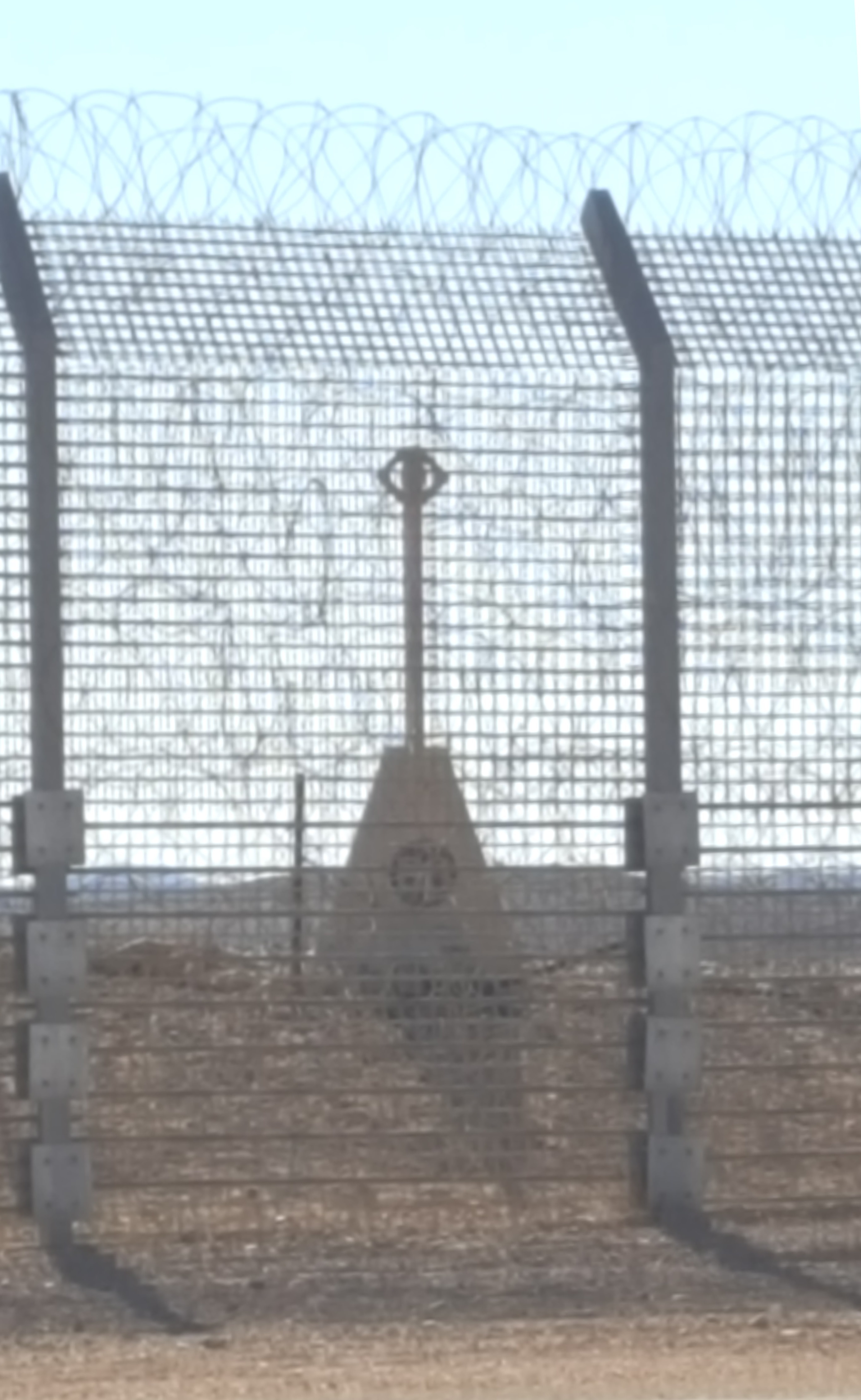
Section of the Egypt–Israel barrier in 2017

While 9,570 citizens of various African countries entered Israel illegally in the first half of 2012, only 34 did the same in the first six months of 2013, after construction of the main section of the barrier was completed. After the entire fence was completed, the number of migrant crossings had dropped to 16 in 2016.

== Egyptian reaction ==
Egypt has stated that it does not object to the construction of any barrier as long as all fortifications are built on Israeli soil.

== See also ==
- Egypt–Israel relations, an overview of the bilateral relationship between the Arab Republic of Egypt and the State of Israel
  - Gaza–Israel barrier, a separation barrier built by Israel along its border with the Palestinian territory of the Gaza Strip
  - Egypt–Gaza barrier, a separation barrier built by Egypt along its border with the Palestinian territory of the Gaza Strip
- Israeli West Bank barrier, a separation barrier built by Israel around the Palestinian territory of the West Bank
