= Battle of Sderot =

2023 battle between Hamas and Israel

- Part of the October 7 attacks and the Gaza war
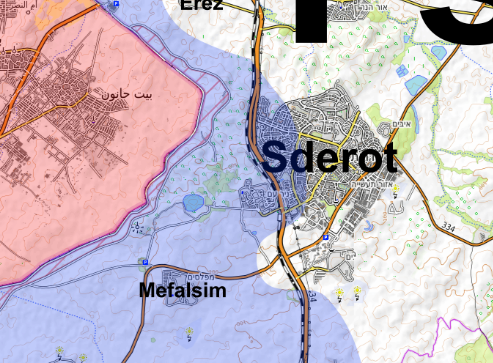
- Front lines
Date	7–8 October 2023
Location	Sderot, Southern District, Israel
Result	See aftermath

Belligerents
Hamas	Israel

Commanders and leaders
	Amir Cohen

Units involved
Nukhba forces	

Casualties and losses
39 killed 2 captured	11 police officers killed 3 soldiers killed 2 firefighters killed 37 civilians killed Town's police station destroyed

The battle of Sderot (Hebrew: קרב שדרות; Arabic: معركة سديروت) began on 7 October 2023, when Hamas launched a large-scale surprise attack on southern Israel, which was widely condemned as an act of terrorism. The Israeli city of Sderot (Hebrew: שְׂדֵרוֹת; Arabic: سديروت), located close to the border between Israel and the Gaza Strip, has frequently been the target of rocket attacks and incursions during the course of the Gaza–Israel conflict. Hamas militants killed numerous civilians and police officers.

== Battle ==
At 6:58 AM on 7 October 2023, 40 Hamas gunmen of the Nukhba unit infiltrated the city after breaching the border between Israel and the Gaza Strip, killing civilians and engaging local security forces. A total of 53 people were killed: 37 civilians, 11 police officers, 2 firefighters, and 1 Israel Defense Forces (IDF) soldier, with an additional 2 IDF soldiers killed by rocket fire on Sderot in the days after the infiltration. Of the Hamas fighters, 39 were killed and one was captured. A Palestinian man unaffiliated with Hamas also crossed into Sderot from the Gaza Strip to loot and was captured.

The battle took place amid a rocket barrage on the city. Rocket fire against Sderot began with the start of the October 7 attack on Israel. A total of 45 rockets were fired at Sderot on October 7, including 10 within the first 45 minutes. Red Color sirens then sounded. The city's bomb shelters were fitted with "smart locks" that should have opened automatically with a Red Alert activation, but due to a technical malfunction in the system 11 shelters failed to open. After Hamas fighters entered the city, authorities sent residents a text message warning of the threat, but as most of the population was religiously observant, many of those who were keeping the Shabbat (Sabbath), on which religious Jews traditionally do not use electronic devices, did not have their phones with them. As a result, many residents were walking around the city or praying in synagogues as late as 9:00 AM, when many militants were still in the city.

The Israel Defense Forces (IDF) unit responsible for the defense of the Sderot sector was the 77th Battalion of the 7th Armored Brigade, which was under the command of the Northern Brigade of the Gaza Division. When the Hamas invasion began, these troops focused on engaging militants who had breached the border fence and fighting along access routes and other communities near the border. According to the IDF investigation, the soldiers thwarted attacks by many dozens of militants who were attempting to reach Sderot and prevented a larger catastrophe from taking place. However, they did not fight inside the city. Due to the widespread Hamas attack on numerous areas simultaneously, the Gaza Division's command and control collapsed, preventing soldiers in the area from receiving reports of the infiltration. Soldiers did not understand the severity of the situation in the city until seeing footage on social media and in the news.

Many civilians were murdered on the street and in homes in the surprise attack. A major focal point of the fighting was the city's police station, which was temporarily taken over by the militants before being recaptured and demolished.

The fighting in Sderot was mainly focused on three locations: the police station, the vicinity of the Mall 7 shopping center, and the Ahuza neighborhood. Hamas fighters gunned down civilians en route to these locations. Local police led the battle against the attackers in the initial hours. The city's 22-member security team, whose members were armed only with pistols, also took part. As the attack unfolded, IDF reinforcements arrived in large numbers. Sderot ended up overflowing with IDF soldiers even as they were urgently needed elsewhere, with massacres taking place at numerous locations in southern Israel, some of which were only reached by troops hours later. According to the IDF investigation, this was mainly because forces heading to the Gaza envelope from the north passed through the city and stopped there to fight. Hamas fighters had also taken some of the main junctions heading south from Sderot, causing further delays. Sderot also took up a lot of attention because clips of the attack on the city were some of the first to circulate on social media and to be broadcast on television. Additionally, the IDF prioritized sending troops to larger cities and towns before it established a clear picture of what was happening under the assumption that Hamas would focus its attack there. About 1,000 Israeli security personnel were in the city at some point on October 7.

Operational control over the city was established at 10:30 AM, although the last remaining Hamas fighters, who had barricaded themselves in the police station, were not flushed out until the morning of October 8.

=== Sderot police station ===
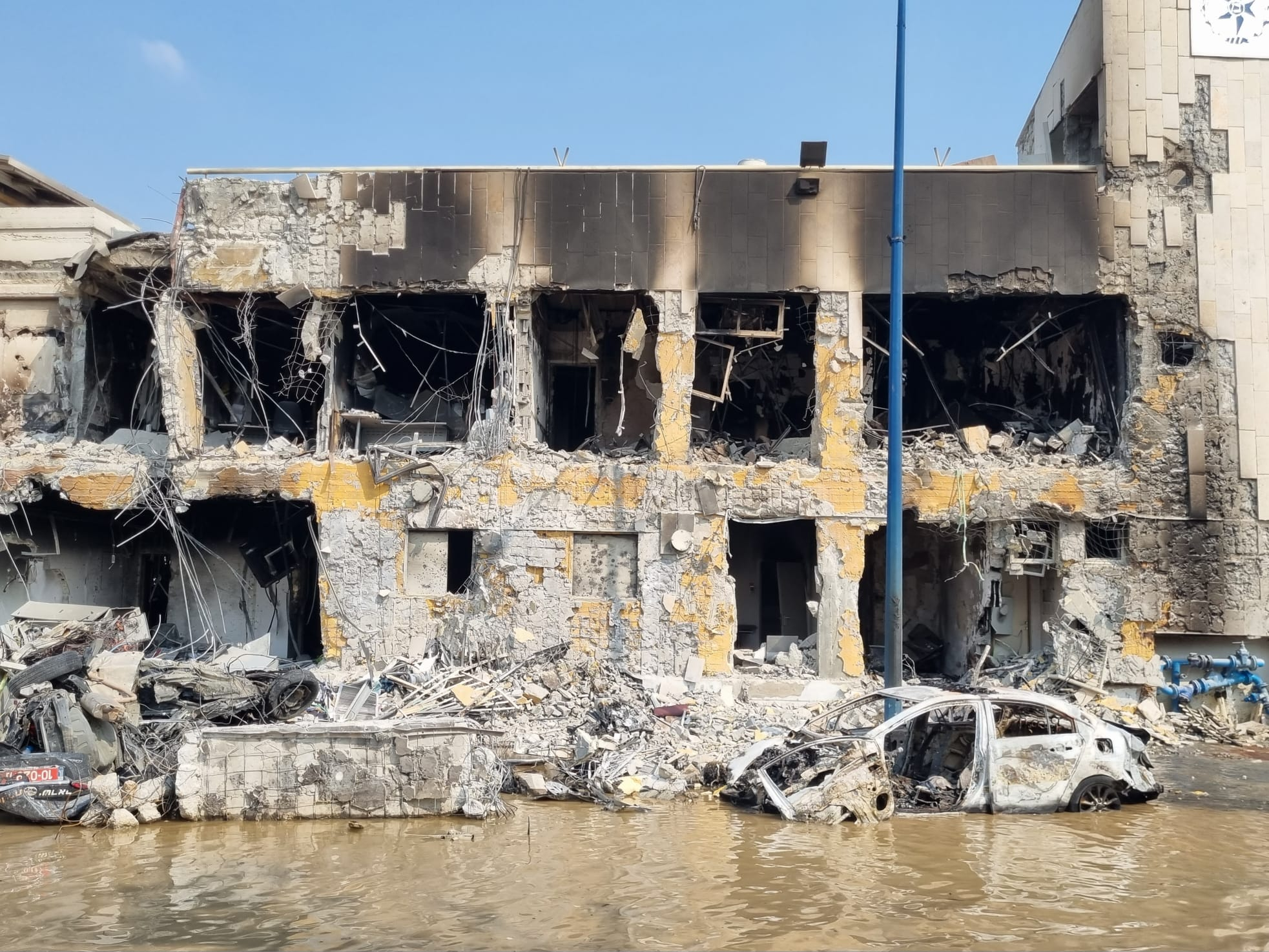
Remains of the Sderot police station, following recapture by the IDF.

At 6:58 AM, a group of 26 Hamas fighters in two pickup trucks and a stolen Hyundai i10 approached Sderot, briefly stopping at a roadside bomb shelter at the entrance to the city where they killed a woman, Mor Gabay. They continued into the city and at a traffic circle encountered a car carrying Dolev and Odaya Swissa and their two young daughters, who were trying to escape the attack. They opened fire, killing Dolev Swissa at 7:00 AM. At 7:03 AM, the militants reached the Sderot police station and opened fire on vehicles in the area, killing the first police officer to arrive at the scene as he reached the entrance. Meanwhile, another officer who was responding to a call about the unfolding Zikim attack and unaware that militants had already reached Sderot exited the station and was killed. After this, the Swissa family car arrived at the police station, driven by Amer Odeh Abu Sabila, a Bedouin-Israeli construction worker from the Negev Bedouin township of Abu Talul, who had been in Sderot that morning when he heard Odaya screaming and had gotten into the driver's seat to bring Odaya and her two daughters to safety at the station, unaware of the presence of the militants there. The militants opened fire, killing Abu Sabila and Odaya Swissa at about 7:07 AM, along with another police officer who had rushed to the scene. The Swissa family's two daughters, Romi and Lia, aged three and six, remained unharmed as they lay on the floor of the vehicle before being rescued by police. At 7:10 AM, an additional police officer arrived at the scene and was killed in his car.

As some of the militants began to raid the station's first floor, the police officers inside the building headed to the roof. At 7:15 AM, one of the officers on the roof opened fire on the militants outside, killing four of them. This caused the militants still outside to rush into the station. As they entered the station, they killed another officer in the briefing room on the first floor. They then attacked the officers on the roof, and two police officers were killed in the exchange of fire that followed. At 7:20 AM, a group of police officers led by the commander of the Israel Police's Southern District, Deputy-Commissioner Amir Cohen, and members of the city's security team, began to arrive at the scene. They launched an assault to retake the station 8:01 AM which failed after coming under massive fire, followed by another one at 8:37 AM, which also failed. Three police officers were killed in these attempts to recapture the station. The assault at 8:37 also resulted in a search and rescue force of the police's Yoav unit becoming trapped inside the station.

At 9:00 AM, a force from the police's elite Yamam counter-terrorism unit arrived at the scene. At 9:52 AM, they launched an attack to recapture the building, during which they managed to take the first floor and recover the wounded. At 1:30 PM, the officers on the roof of the station were rescued with a firefighting crane. At 2:00 PM, by which time there were no more officers inside the building, an attempt was made to recapture the roof from the militants but failed. At 4:00 PM, IDF troops and police began carrying out the Pressure Cooker procedure, an IDF tactic to flush out militants barricaded inside a building by escalating the volume of fire against it. As part of the procedure, M72 LAW missiles were fired at the police station. At 7:00 PM, four militants attempted to flee the building and were killed by the forces waiting outside. Another five militants tried to escape and were also killed at 10:23 PM. At 10:37 PM, an Israeli Air Force (IAF) drone carried out a strike on the building and at 11:37 PM, an IDF tank shelled it. At 1:50 AM on October 8, an Israeli Air Force (IAF) helicopter fired at the station.

During the night, three bulldozers were brought in to demolish the building. At 2:00 AM, a militant attempted to escape and was killed and at 2:13 AM, a further four militants attempted to escape and were also killed. At 8:46 AM, the final militant inside the police station was killed. The station was declared cleared at 9:30 AM.

=== Mall 7 shopping center ===
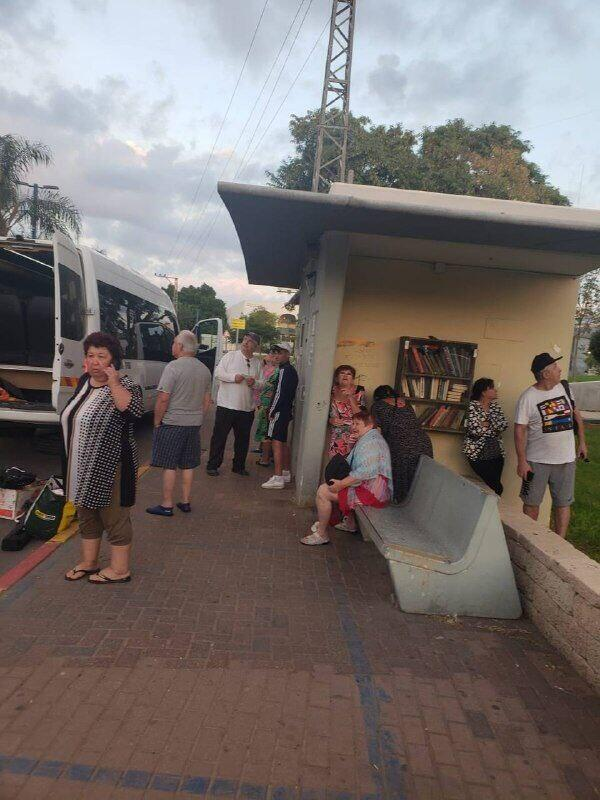
The elderly passengers of the minibus pictured minutes before they were killed

At 7:01 AM, a group of 9 militants riding pickup trucks entered Sderot and killed a man on his way to work as they drove through the city. At about 7:15 AM, they reached a public bomb shelter close to the city's Rami Levy supermarket, where they killed 13 elderly people who had been on their way to an outing at a Dead Sea resort. They had stopped in the area after their minibus was halted by a flat tire and Hamas' attack on Israel began as they were waiting. The bomb shelter did not open, leaving them stuck outside. Minutes later, the militants arrived and shot them all dead. The images of their bodies lying in the vicinity of the shelter were some of the first images of the October 7 attack to be shared on social media. The minibus driver survived the incident. The militants proceeded to kill another four people close to the Rami Levy supermarket and then set out for the Mall 7 shopping center on the edge of the city, killing two more people en route.

After reaching the Mall 7 shopping center, the militants attempted to enter a gas station where 11 people were hiding at around 7:28 AM before heading out of the city and reaching the Sderot Junction. A group of Yamam officers had arrived in the area and engaged them. Three militants and one Yamam officer were killed. The surviving militants fled towards the Sderot railway station. At 8:35 AM, Yamam officers and several other Israel Border Police officers exchanged fire with the militants along Highway 34, near the railway station. By 10:00 AM, when another group of police officers arrived, all of the remaining militants were killed.

=== Ahuza neighborhood ===
At 7:30 AM, five Hamas militants entered the city's Ahuza neighborhood on foot and began attempting to enter homes and kill the residents inside. They managed to breach one home and kill a man, and spent the next hour walking around the neighborhood trying to enter more homes. At 8:30 AM, they tried to enter a synagogue and killed a man outside the building. After two soldiers inside the synagogue engaged the militants, they left the area and resumed attempting to break into homes.

At 8:35 AM, the militants killed an elderly man and then split up. Yamam officers who had been dispatched to the Ahuza neighborhood arrived and killed three of the militants at 8:40 AM. At 8:45, IDF soldiers of the elite LOTAR counter-terrorism unit arrived in the neighborhood and encountered one of the militants. The militant and an IDF soldier were killed in the subsequent exchange of fire. The fifth militant was captured at 9:15 AM after he was discovered hiding in a bush. At 10:00 AM, a Palestinian man unaffiliated with Hamas who had entered Israel through the Erez Crossing, which had also been attacked by Hamas, reached the neighborhood. He broke into a kindergarten and stole a knife before being discovered and detained by soldiers at 10:30 AM.

== Aftermath ==
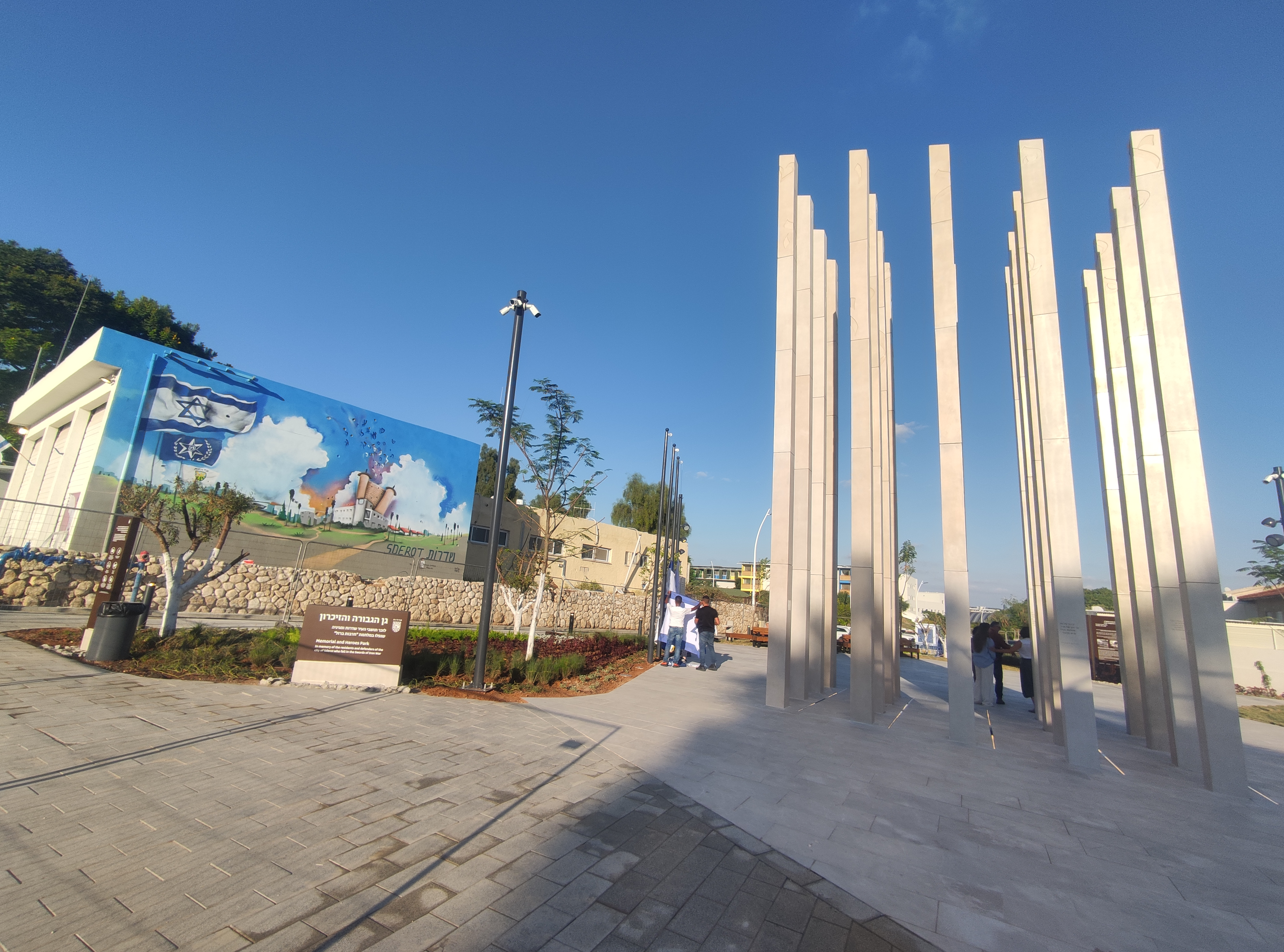
Sderot Memorial and Heroes Park, on the site of the former police station.

Late on October 8, the Sderot Municipality released the names of the IDF, Israel Police, and fire personnel killed in the attack. Among those slain by Hamas gunmen was the commander of the Kiryat Gat Fire Station.

Hamas launched more rocket attacks on Sderot on October 8, claiming to have fired 100 rockets at the city. The rockets triggered the rocket warning system in Sderot and other Israeli communities near the Gaza border. Magen David Adom reported that one Israeli in Sderot was severely wounded by rocket fire early on October 8. Rocket fire on the city killed two soldiers in the days following the attack, one on October 8 and another on October 12.

Although full control of the situation was reestablished on October 8, Israeli forces continued to battle pockets of Hamas gunmen in Southern Israel, including in Magen, and occasional gunfire was heard in Sderot and other locales, where Israeli forces were sweeping the area for any remaining Hamas infiltrators. Authorities ordered residents of Sderot, as well as neighboring kibbutz Mefalsim, to stay at home after a suspected infiltration.

The vast majority of the city's population was evacuated to hotels around Israel in days following the attack. Rocket fire continued to target the city, with some homes suffering direct hits. In the months that followed, rocket fire abated as the IDF conducted a major ground offensive in the Gaza Strip and the majority of the residents returned.

Several relatives of the elderly people killed outside a bomb shelter sued the Sderot Municipality and Motorola Solutions, which operated the "smart shelter" system, over the failure of the shelter to open.

The Sderot police station, which was heavily damaged in the fighting, was subsequently totally demolished. The site where the police station once stood is now the Sderot Memorial and Heroes Park, a commemoration site for the battle. It includes 18 pillars constructed from remnants of the building.

The story of Amer Abu Sabila, who had been killed while trying to save the Swissa family, garnered widespread recognition in Israel, stirring discussions about the co-existence and cooperation between Arabs and Jews in Israel.

== See also ==
- Outline of the Gaza war
- Timeline of the Israeli–Palestinian conflict in 2023
- Timeline of the Gaza war (7 October 2023 – 27 October 2023)
