= 2014 Zikim attack =

Hamas operation

- Part of 2014 Gaza war
Date	8 July 2014
Location	Zikim, Israel
Result	Israeli victory: Hamas raid on the Zikim base fails

Belligerents
Hamas; (Hamas) Izz ad-Din Al-Qassam Brigades; Al-Nukhba Force	Israel

Strength
5 frogmen	Unknown

Casualties and losses
5 killed	None

On the evening of 8 July 2014, five Izz ad-Din al-Qassam Brigades militants, who were members of the Nukhba forces, attempting to infiltrate Israel by swimming from the Gaza Strip to Zikim beach in southern Israel. All five were killed by the IDF.

== Operation ==
Five Hamas frogmen of the al-Qassam Brigades attempted to infiltrate Zikim via the northern beaches of Gaza. According to the IDF, all the infiltrators were killed.

The attackers were members of the Nukhba forces, Hamas's special forces unit.

== Aftermath ==
According to journalist Avi Issacharoff, the Zikim attack was another example, albeit unsuccessful, of Hamas attempting to conduct higher "quality" attacks during Operation Protective Edge. The other example he cited was Hamas's new ability to fire rockets at the Israeli city of Hadera north of Tel Aviv. Hamas television stations and Arabic satellite stations celebrated the Zikim raid and rocket attacks.

In December 2014, the IDF initiated an investigation following the leak of a film from an internal inquiry, which was subsequently circulated in Palestinian media. The footage revealed a significantly longer duration of the battle than what was previously presented to the public by the IDF. The video contained omitted scenes, including those showing militants approaching an IDF Caterpillar D9 armoured bulldozer and placing an explosive on it, and hurling a grenade at a tank. The tank's armor resisted the blast and the crew remained unharmed. These sections had reportedly been withheld by the IDF for security reasons. The IDF Spokesman's Office addressed the leak as a "severe incident" that would be investigated internally, rather than through media channels.

Additionally, the footage showcased the audio communications between the Israeli Navy’s Erez Regional Control Center and military units during their operation to kill the Hamas commandos. The response involved tanks, cannon fire from a Dvora patrol boat of Squadron 916 and ultimately support from the Israeli Air Force. According to IDF assessments, the commando unit was dispatched by senior Hamas militant Ahmed Elghandour. Taysir Mubasher, the former commander of Hamas's naval forces, was also claimed by the IDF to have been involved in the attack.

Hamas launched a similar attack against Zikim in 2023, during the October 7 attack on Israel.

== See also ==
- Bahad 4
