= Adjutant Corps =

Military unit of the Israel Defense Forces

Coordinates: 32°05′10″N 34°49′15″E

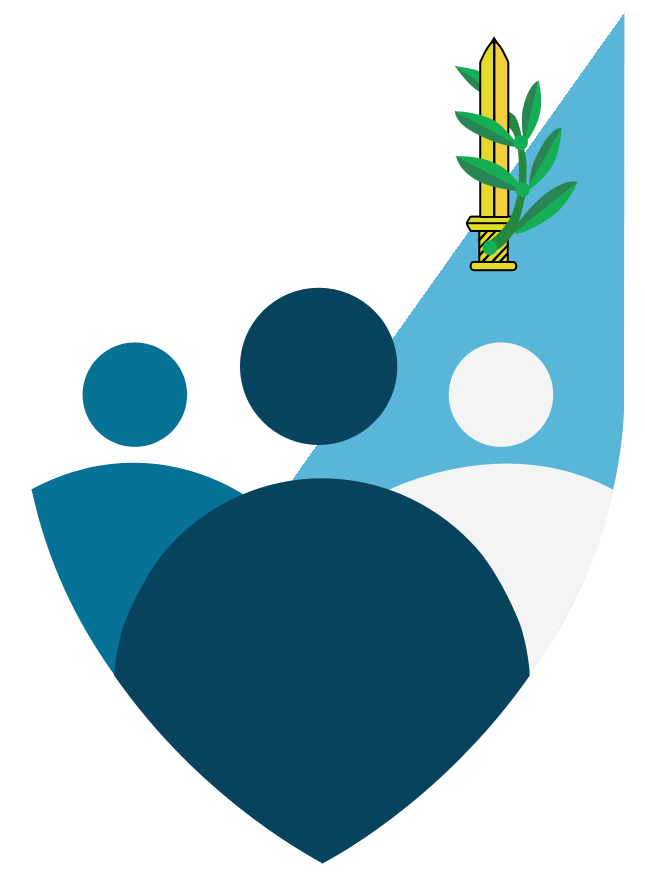
- Adjutant Corps insignia
- Active: 1977–present
- Country: Israel

Commanders
- Current commander: Tat aluf Edna Ilya

Insignia
- Flag

- Shoulder tag

The Israeli Adjutant Corps is a support corps in the IDF Human Resources Directorate. Its current commander is Tat aluf (Brigadier general) Edna Ilya.

The corps's designation is to assist IDF commanders in dealing with manpower, as well as soldiers' individual problems. It employs an adjutant officer, as well as assistants, in almost every unit, as well as a liaison officer in reserve units, who is responsible for the manpower aspect of the unit, as well as attending to the reservists' individual needs.

== History ==
The corps was created on May 22, 1977, as one of three corps established as a conclusion to drawing lesson from the IDF's shortcomings in the Yom Kippur War. During the war, the hasty manner in which reserve troops were called to service as well as the reconstitution of fighting units, especially critically needed tank crews, posed special problems for the Manpower Directorate, ones which the corps is designed to address.

The idea to create an adjutant corps was raised before the Yom Kippur War, but was not implemented. After the war, the necessity of the corps was understood and the Chief of Staff of the time, Mordechai Gur, in a meeting with senior officers from the Manpower Directorate, now Human Resources Directorate, decided on its creation.

The Adjutant Corps transferred from the Human Resources Directorate to the GOC Army Headquarters during the course of 2006. Official responsibility for the corps passed to the command in January 2006. After a while it was decided to transfer it back to the Human Resources Directorate, and it was moved in June 2008.

== Training ==
Adjutant Corps personnel are trained in Training Base 11 located in the City of Training Bases.

== Commanders ==
Name	Term
Matityahu Niv	January 7, 1977 – August 3, 1979
Dan Raz	August 3, 1979 – January 28, 1983
Benny Dekel	January 28, 1983 – June 14, 1985
Aharon Ophir	June 14, 1985 – May 7, 1989
Israel Einav	May 7, 1989 – April 23, 1993
Haim Ashkenazi	April 23, 1993 – April 10, 1997
Zvi Waxberg	April 10, 1997 – June 14, 2001
Yossi Peretz	June 14, 2001 – May 15, 2005
Orna Barbivai	May 15, 2005 – June 12, 2008
Moshe Alush	June 12, 2008 – August 8, 2011
Arie Dahan	August 8, 2011 – August 11, 2014
Shlomi Sandrosi	August 11, 2014 – August 30, 2017
Sammy Holtzken	August 30, 2017 – August 3, 2020
Tzachi Hefetz	August 3, 2020 – July 30, 2023
Edna Ilya	July 2023 – present
