= Bahad =

Bahad (Hebrew: בה"ד, short for Bsis Hadrakha (Hebrew: בסיס הדרכה), lit. Training base) is a military training base in the Israel Defense Forces. Each Bahad deals with a certain field, such as law enforcement or logistics. Generally, each Bahad belongs to a certain corps and conducts all courses required by the corps in question. Some training bases also train the new recruits of the corps.

The Israel Defense Forces also has several Bahads which don't belong to any particular corps and exist for the sole purpose of training new recruits. They are called recruit training bases, or Batars (Hebrew: בט"ר, short for Bsis Tironut (Hebrew: בסיס טירונות)).

Many Bahads were located in Camp Yadin (Tzrifin), until the establishment of Camp Ariel Sharon in southern Israel. Tzrifin is being evacuated and sold to civilian contractors (due to high real estate value.) Camp Sharon is now the IDF's official training school base.

== Training bases (Bahad) ==
- Bahad 1 - the school for officers. Located in Camp Laskov, near Mitzpe Ramon. Does not belong to a single corps, and all soldiers train there before becoming officers, except for air force and navy shipboard officers as well as certain other officers.
- Bahad 2 - the school for battalion and brigade commanders. Merged withe Bahad 3 in 1954.
- Bahad 3 - the school for Infantry (now part of a brigade that consists of 3 bases).
- Bahad 4 - a.k.a. Batar Zikim, located near kibbutz Zikim (recruit training).
- Bahad 5 - the school for Armored Corps.
- Bahad 6 - the school for Logistics Corps.
- Bahad 7 - the school for C4I Corps (telecommunications and computers).
- Bahad 8 - Wingate Institute, fitness and hand-to-hand combat.
- Bahad 9 - the school for Artillery Corps.
- Bahad 10 - the school for Medical Corps. Also houses the School for Communication and Coordination, of COGAT.
- Bahad 11 - Adjutant Corps and General Corps.
- Bahad 12 - used to be a school for non-combat officers (particularly female officers), located in Tzrifin. Now serves as the Magal academy for non-combat commanders.
- Bahad 13 - the school for Military Police Corps.
- Bahad 14 - the school for Combat Engineering Corps.
- Bahad 15 - the school for Intelligence Corps.
- Bahad 16 - the school for search and rescue, Home Front Command, located in Tzrifin.
- Bahad 20 - the school for the Ordnance Corps.
- Bahad 600 - the school for the Israeli Navy.

== Recruit training bases (Batar) ==
- Batar Nitzanim - located in Camp Yehoshu'a, within the Nitzanim Nature Reserve.
- Camp Dotan (Camp 80) - located in the area bordering Pardes Hanna-Karkur.
