= Kidnapping and murder of Sasson Nuriel =

2005 Hamas attack

On 21 September 2005, 51-year-old Israeli businessman Sasson Nuriel was kidnapped by members of a cell of Palestinian militant group Hamas, one of whom was employed by Nuriel. Nuriel was from Pisgat Ze’ev near Jerusalem and owned a candy business and employed Arab workers in his factory.

Hamas released a video on 27 September of Nuriel, who was bound and blindfolded, speaking in Arabic and calling for the release of Palestinian prisoners held in Israel.

== Responsibility ==
According to Israeli police, a Hamas member arrested during a joint operation by the IDF and Shin Bet on 25 September led Israeli forces to Nuriel's body in an industrial zone in Beitunia in the West Bank. Israeli internal security minister Gideon Ezra announced on 26 September that Israeli security forces had arrested Hamas members near Ramallah for purported ties to the kidnapping.

Hamas claimed responsibility for Nuriel's kidnapping and killing on 27 September. According to the Hamas statement, the group had intended to kidnap Nuriel and exchange him for Palestinian prisoners held in Israeli jails, but killed Nuriel after Israeli security services began conducted arrest raids in the West Bank. Hamas alleged that Nuriel was a member of the Shin Bet. The Fatah-appointed mayor of Beitunia Arafat Khalaf stated to The Independent that "I am against it. I want to live in peace with two states side by side." The Israeli government brought charges against two men they claimed were involved in Nuriel's killing on 17 November.

On 29 September, Israeli security officials arrested Samar Sabih, an explosives expert from Gaza, in Tulkarm for her role allegedly training the cell associated with Nuriel's kidnapping.

== Later developments ==
One of the Hamas members arrested in 2005 for involvement in the event was Ali Qadhi. After his release as part of the 2011 Gilad Shalit prisoner exchange, Qadhi later was a company commander in Hamas's Nukhba commando unit and was involved in the 2023 Hamas attack on Israel. The Israel Defense Forces killed Qadhi in a drone strike on 13 October 2023.
