= Recruit training in the Israel Defense Forces =

Basic training in the Israeli military

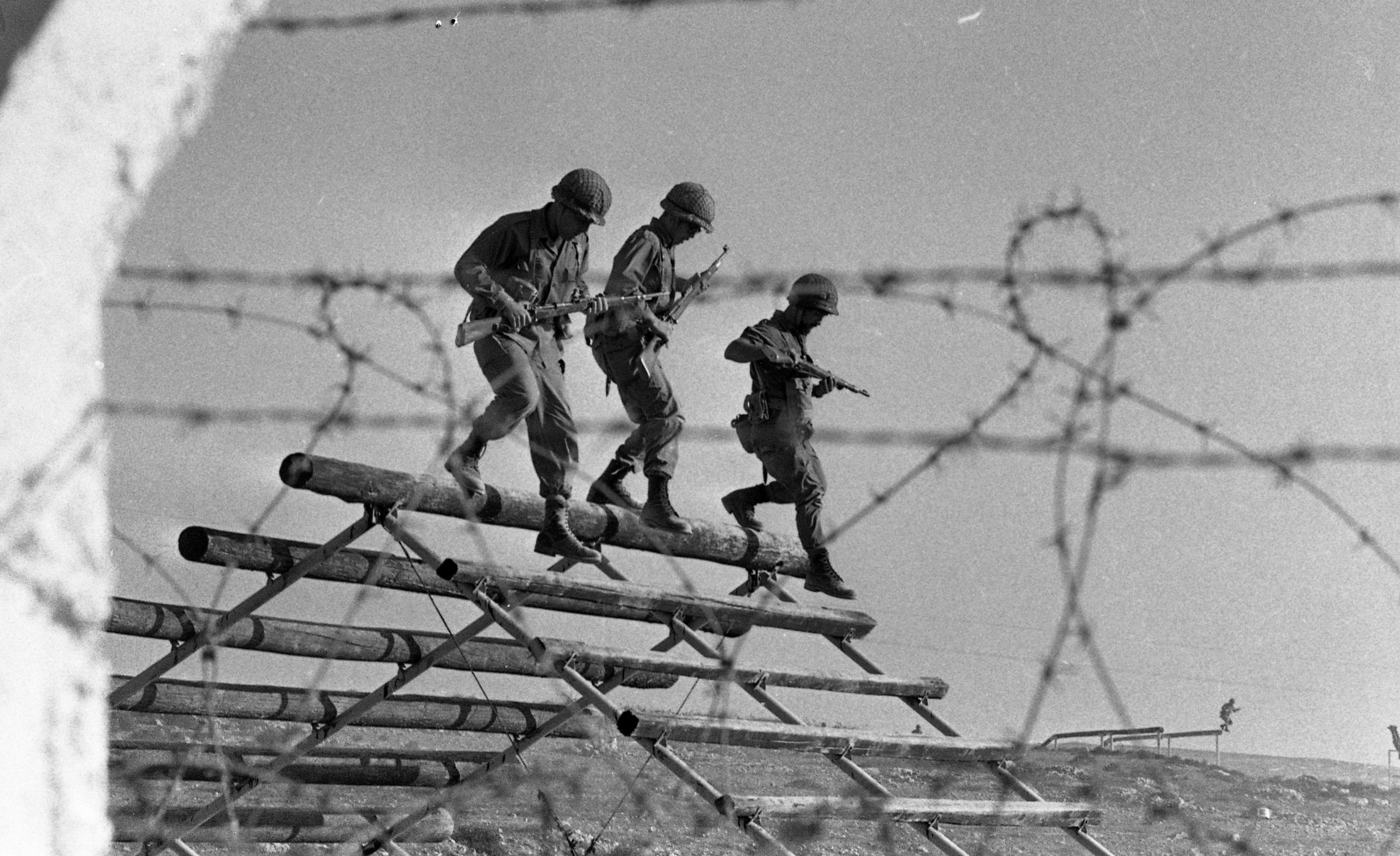
Soldiers in Tironut, 1969

Tironut (Hebrew: טירונות) is the Hebrew term for the recruit training of the Israel Defense Forces (IDF).

There are different levels of recruit training, and each corps or major unit has their own training program. Upon completing tironut, non-combat recruits are certified as Rifleman 02. Combat recruits must complete Rifleman 03 basic training. Generally, infantry-specific training ranges from Rifleman 05 (artillery corps, border patrol) to Rifleman 07 (infantry and combat engineers, sappers, upon completion of advanced infantry training), whereas armored or artillery corps complete Rifleman 03 training. Elite units such as Sayeret Matkal do not complete a standard basic training course for a rifleman certification and have their own extended training courses which last over one year.

All recruits in the IDF basic training wear the general all-army olive drab beret and get their corps beret upon completion, in a ceremony where the recruits swear into the IDF. Infantry units and some others such as military police swear in at the Western Wall, other units at other locations such as the Armoured Corps Memorial at Latrun, the Western Wall and Ammunition Hill in Jerusalem, Akko prison, training bases etc.

== Certification requirements ==
IDF recruits are trained to at minimum one of the rifleman certification has a number of requirements, although recruit training programs typically include more than what the certification requires. Some programs, such as the Extended Rifleman 02, train recruits for the next Rifleman qualification (in this case, Rifleman 03), but the recruits do not get the higher certificate.

For weapons, theoretical and practical knowledge is typically required - theoretical being the knowledge of how the gun works, the names of its parts, etc. Practical is the ability to take apart the weapon, load it, fix jams, etc. Recruits are also required to be able to hit targets with most weapons they work with.

=== Rifleman 02 ===
- Knowledge of the M16 assault rifle (theory and practical)
- Ability to hit targets with the M16 assault rifle (out of at least fifteen bullets)
- Knowledge of the standard IDF communications equipment (theory and practical)
- Knowledge of first aid (theory)
- Knowledge of how to protect oneself against chemical and biological weapons/hazards (theory and practical)

=== Rifleman 02 Cadets/ Extended ===
- All Rifleman 02 requirements
- (Back when the Galil was in service) Knowledge of the IMI Galil assault rifle (theory and practical)
- Knowledge of several types of hand grenades (theory with "pakpak" grenades)
- Single and squad combat maneuvers
- Basic field navigation (theory and practical) - "field week"
- Knowledge of radio equipment operation (MK 77)

=== Rifleman 03 ===
- All Rifleman 02 requirements
- (Back when the Galil was in service) Knowledge of the IMI Galil assault rifle (theory and practical)
- Ability to hit targets with the Galil
- Knowledge of the M240 machine gun "MAG" (theory and practical)
- Knowledge of several types of grenades (theory and practical)
- Knowledge of basic field navigation and survival (theory and practical)
- Single and squad combat maneuvers (practical)
- In Drill sergeant's course ("Kurs Makim"): Ability to teach basic Rifleman 02 subjects and excellent knowledge of Rifleman 03 subjects.

== Course of the training ==
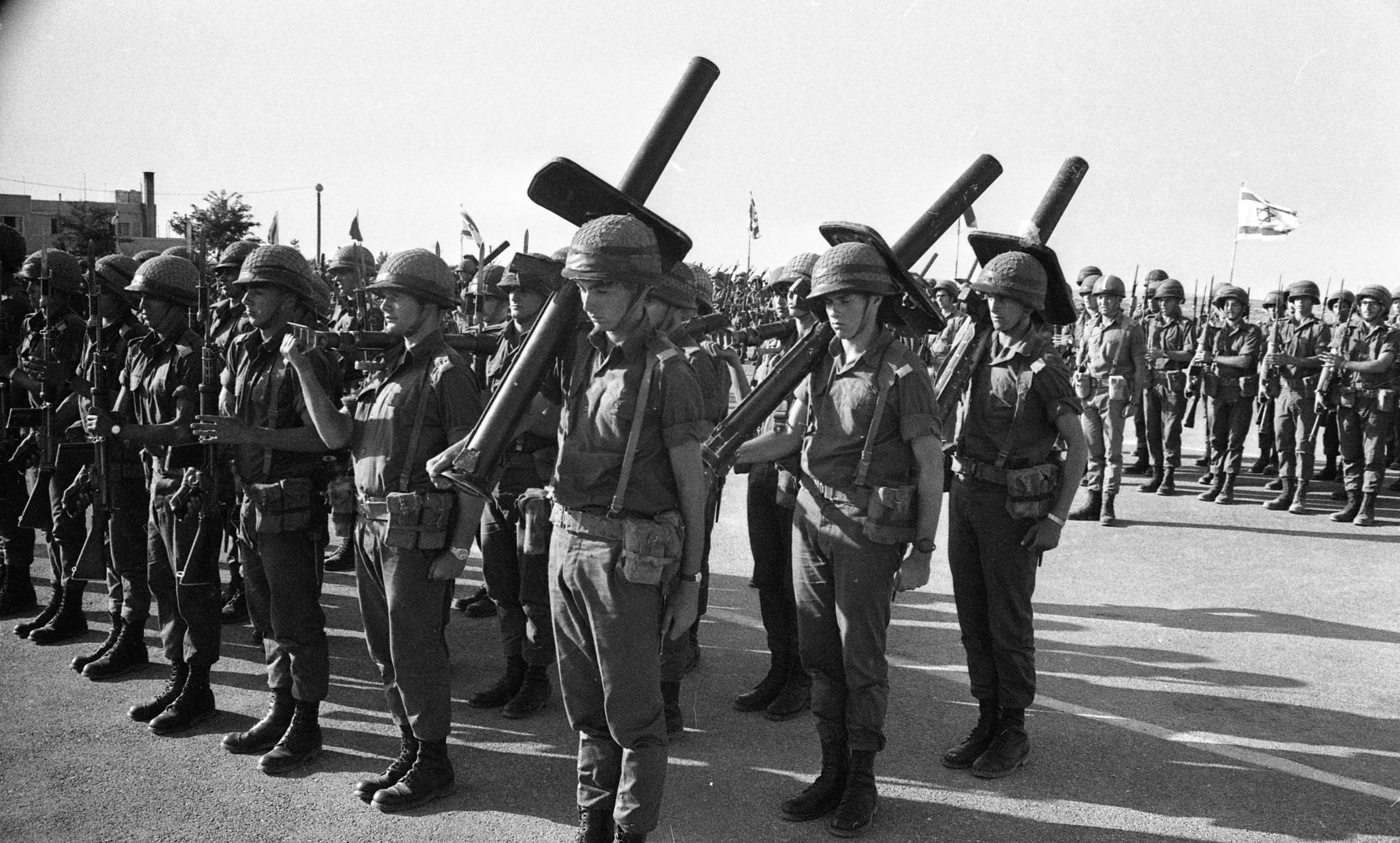
Finishing of Tironut exercises in Bahad 4, 1969

At the beginning of each basic training course, there are several days of 'integration', where drill instructors convert recruits from civilians to soldiers. These are usually considered the most difficult days of any basic training program, even though they are not physically draining. During these days, recruits receive no breaks and the discipline is at its highest level.

While essentially each rifleman level and each corps training varies greatly, there are some commonalities between the entire army. All soldiers are issued weapons after their integration days and must carry them until the end of the basic training course. Many lessons are also common for all corps, such as moreshet krav (literally "battle heritage"), where soldiers are taught about past IDF operations.

Physical and verbal aggression are not permitted in the IDF basic training, which leaves drill instructors with a limited number of ways to hand out punishments. Physical punishments such as push-ups and running are common ways to punish for several discipline issues. Another method of punishment is giving detention - keeping a soldier several more days in the training base instead of visiting home; or simply delaying the visit home by a few hours. Combat units also see more group punishments, where if one soldier makes a mistake, the entire platoon suffers; although non-combat units also sometimes see this punishment. Training soldiers may avoid certain tasks or punishments with proper documents from doctors and specialists, if they see fit that the process would harm their health condition. Also popular are so called "creative" punishments which consist of different tasks or instructions which are usually directly related to the infraction made- for example if a recruit throws a cigarette butt on the floor they could be made to collect a set quantity of cigarette butts, if a recruit leaves gear behind they could be made to carry extra gear on them, etc.

At the end of each basic training course, recruits swear in to the IDF and receive their corps berets, after which they go to their respective professional training courses. In most units, there is a ceremony called distance-breaking, which involves the commanders telling the recruits their names, after which they are no longer these specific recruits' commanders and may call them by their first names only. In most combat units, distance-breaking is done after the professional course.

=== Combat training ===
In combat units, the goal of basic training, in addition to imparting the military mentality, is to teach combat skills, physical fitness, and social cohesion. To enter a combat unit, a cadet must meet the Medical profile demanded by that unit. The minimum medical profile required to enter a combat unit is 72, signifying a moderate medical impairment, and those with profile 72 are eligible for a variety of combat positions but considered unfit for infantry service. All infantry soldiers must have a minimum medical profile of 82, which signifies only a slight problem, and soldiers in elite units must have a profile of 97, signifying full physical and mental health, though some minor health problems (such as eyeglasses with a small number) may not be enough to disqualify a candidate. Basic training for combat units generally lasts four months and ends with a final march, after which the recruits are sworn into the IDF. Afterwards, recruits go through advanced training which lasts between four months and a year in regular combat units, with the length of advanced training depending on the unit. Combat training in elite commando units can last between 15 and 22 months, depending on the unit. The final step for ground combat units is the "Masa Kumta" (Beret March), during which recruits must march between 20 and 45 miles depending on their unit at night in combat gear carrying stretchers. After completing the march, soldiers receive the beret of their unit and are formally inducted into the IDF. The training course for pilots at the Israeli Air Force Flight Academy takes three years to complete, and is followed by a year of operational training.

Cadets for some special forces units and pilots in training also endure a two-week course in surviving captivity toward the end of their training, in which they are taken by surprise in a mock kidnapping and held in prison-like conditions for two weeks, during which they are interrogated, threatened, subjected to physical violence, and forced to perform demeaning activities.

== Training bases ==
- All-army (non-combat) - Rifleman 02
  - Bahad 4 (Batar Zikim) (זיקים)
  - Camp Yehoshu'a (a.k.a. Batar Nitzanim) (ניצנים)
  - Camp Dotan (a.k.a. Camp 80) (מחנה 80)
- Soldiers with adaptation problems (Mak'am) - Rifleman 02
  - Havat HaShomer (חוות השומר)
- Soldiers with fewer than twelve years of general education (at the conclusion of their service period) or lack of Hebrew speaking skills - Rifleman 02
  - Michve Alon (מחוה אלון)
- Military police - Rifleman 02
  - Bahad 13
- Ordnance Corps - Rifleman 02
  - Bahad 20
- Home Front Command rescue units
  - Bahad 16
- Anti Aircraft - Rifleman 03
  - Bisla (ביסל"א - acronym of school for AA/aerial defence)
- Air force cadets
  - Designated air force bases - Riflemen 02 Cadet / Extended

== See also ==
- Talpiot program
