= Versailles wedding hall disaster =

2001 disaster in Jerusalem

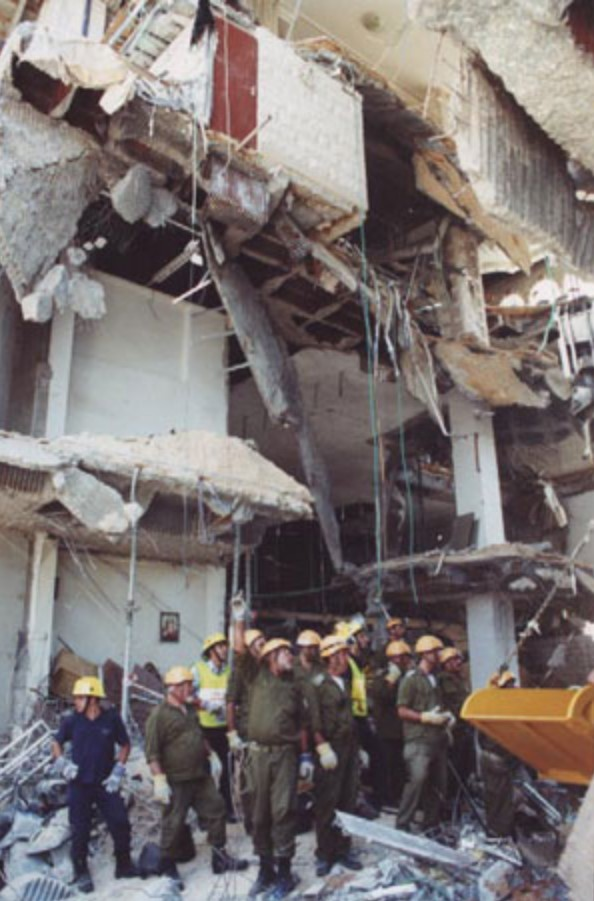
- Aftermath of the disaster
- Date: 24 May 2001
- Time: 22:43
- Location: Talpiot, Jerusalem, Israel; 31.7485°N 35.2162°E
- Cause: Insufficient load capacity due to flawed structural design
- Deaths: 23
- Injuries: 356
- Charges: Manslaughter, Negligence

At 22:43 on 24 May 2001, a large portion of the third floor of the Versailles Wedding Hall collapsed in Talpiot neighborhood, in Jerusalem, Israel. Twenty-three people fell to their deaths through two stories, while another 356 were injured to varying degrees.

The disaster is among the deadliest civil disasters in Israeli history, with only the 2010 Mount Carmel forest fire and the 2021 Meron crowd crush having a higher number of deaths.

In the aftermath of the disaster, the Israeli parliament passed the "Versailles Law" establishing a special committee responsible for treating the people injured in the disaster and an investigative committee was established by the then-prime minister Ariel Sharon under the leadership of the former judge Vardimos Zeiler, which probed both the Versailles disaster and the unrelated Maccabiah bridge collapse which had occurred several years earlier.

Eli Ron, who invented the Pal-Kal construction method, and three engineers involved in the construction of the hall were found guilty along with the three owners of the hall of causing death by negligence and sabotage by negligence.

== Background ==
The Versailles Wedding Hall was built in 1986 in Talpiot in southeastern Jerusalem by engineer Eli Ron, who invented the Pal-Kal method. The floors were built with metal plates and thin layers of cement. The floor had started to visibly sag and as a result, the owners installed partitions on the floors below to stabilize and correct the sagging floors. Shortly thereafter, the owners, thinking that the issue was cosmetic, decided to remove these partitions.

== Collapse ==
Nearly 700 guests attended the wedding of Keren and Asaf Dror, which was hosted on the third floor of the Versailles Wedding Hall, 24 May 2001. The lower two floors were not occupied. Shortly before the collapse, hundreds of wedding guests were on the dance floor, with the song "Lev Zahav" by Sarit Hadad playing. The third floor suddenly gave way, and hundreds of guests fell with the progressive collapse, through the two lower stories of the wedding hall.

=== Casualties ===
23 people died due to the collapse and 356 people were injured to varying degrees, with 130 still in hospital days later. The bride, Keren Dror, suffered serious pelvic injuries which required multiple surgeries. Asaf Dror, the groom, escaped serious injury himself; however, his 80-year-old grandfather was among those killed in the collapse.

=== Rescue efforts ===
Immediately after the collapse the Home Front Command carried out rescue efforts with the Search & Rescue Unit and a reserve unit. Rescue efforts commenced with rescuers digging with bare hands amid fears the rest of the building could collapse. The rescue search was called off on May 26.

=== Documentation ===
The disaster was captured by cameraman David Amromin who was recording the wedding via camcorder. The footage which captured the collapse and subsequent mayhem was broadcast around the world on TV networks.

List of fatalities

- Menachem Aslan
  מנחם אסלן
- Moti Butyl
  מוטי בוטיל
- Inbal Ben-shushan
  ענבל בן־שושן
- Tiferet Heimenrath
  תפארת היימנרט
- Ayelet Hernick
  איילת הרניק
- Hanit Tobol
  חנית טובול
- Hanna Cohen
  חני כהן
- Sasson Cohen
  ששון כהן
- Shunit Cohen
  שונית כהן
- Vico Cohen
  ויקו כהן
- Yafa Levi
  יפה לוי
- Rebekah Levi
  רבקה לוי
- Orit Moreno
  אורית מורנו
- Hannah & Rafael Menashe
  חנה ורפאל מנשה
- Geulah Moshe
  גאולה משה
- Itai Jacob Reyes
  איתי יעקב רייז
- Elior Sror
  אליאור סרור
- Maryam Sror
  מרים סרור
- Moshe Sror
  משה סרור
- Jacqueline Sha'ya
  ז'קלין שעיה
- Nissim Shriki
  נסים שריקי
- Yosef Shriki
  יוסף שריקי

== Investigation ==
An investigation of the event concluded that it was not caused by a terrorist attack (considering the disaster occurred during the Second Intifada). This was based on the testimony provided by many of the wedding guests present in the building during the disaster. Witnesses reported seeing a dangerous sag in the floor moments before the collapse. An initial inquiry blamed the collapse on the Pal-Kal method of constructing light-weight coffered concrete floor systems which was banned shortly after the completion of the wedding hall since it was known and proven to be unsafe. Further review pointed to a combination of two alternative causes.

Initially, the side of the building that failed was designed to be a two-storey structure, while the other side was designed to be three storeys. Late in the construction process, it was decided that both sides of the building should be equal heights, and a third storey was added to the shorter side. However, the live load due to occupancy is typically much greater than the design load for a roof. As a result, the structure supporting the new third storey was subjected to much greater loading than was originally anticipated. The effect of this error was somewhat mitigated by the construction of partitions on the floor below, which helped redistribute the excess load such that no damage was incurred.

A few weeks before the collapse, the wedding hall owners decided to remove the partitions. With the load path eliminated, the floor above began to sag several centimetres. The owners viewed the sagging floor primarily as a cosmetic problem, and attempted to level it with additional grout and fill. However, their approach not only failed to provide additional structural capacity, it also inadvertently introduced a new and significant dead load at the weakened area.

During the wedding event in 2001, this significantly overstressed floor section failed, resulting in the catastrophe. The engineer Eli Ron, inventor of the Pal-Kal method of construction, was arrested and subsequently indicted in August 2002 on the charge of manslaughter.

== Aftermath ==
Following the disaster, the "Versailles Law" was passed by the Parliament of Israel. This law established a special committee responsible for treating the people injured in the disaster. Moreover, an official investigation committee was established by the then Prime Minister Ariel Sharon under the leadership of the former judge Vardimos Zeiler, who was in charge of the security of public places and buildings. The Zeiler Committee on Building Safety investigated both the Versailles wedding hall collapse as well as the Maccabiah bridge collapse which had occurred four years earlier in 1997, and released its final report in December 2003.

Multiple individuals were arrested shortly after the disaster. In October 2004, the three owners of Versailles wedding hall — Avraham Adi, Uri Nisim, and Efraim Adiv – were convicted of causing death by negligence and causing damage by negligence. Adi and Adiv were sentenced to 30 months' imprisonment while Nisim was sentenced to four months of community service.

The wedding hall was subsequently demolished, and as of 2023 the site remained unoccupied and sealed. Across the street from the site is a memorial garden with the names of the victims inscribed on a wall.

In December 2006, the court convicted four men for negligent charges. In May 2007, these men were formally sentenced by the Jerusalem District Court. Eli Ron received a four-year sentence, Shimon Kaufman and Dan Sheffer 22 months, and Uri Pessah six months.

=== In popular culture ===
The Pal-Kal issue was mentioned in the episode "Point of Origin", season 1, episode 5, of the show 9-1-1, where an Indian Wedding goes awry when dancing guests collapse the third floor, killing dozens. Captain Robert Nash describes the building having used the prohibited "Kal-Pal" technique and angrily attacks the owner for causing death by negligience.

=== Memorial ===
A memorial garden to the victims was built near the disaster site.

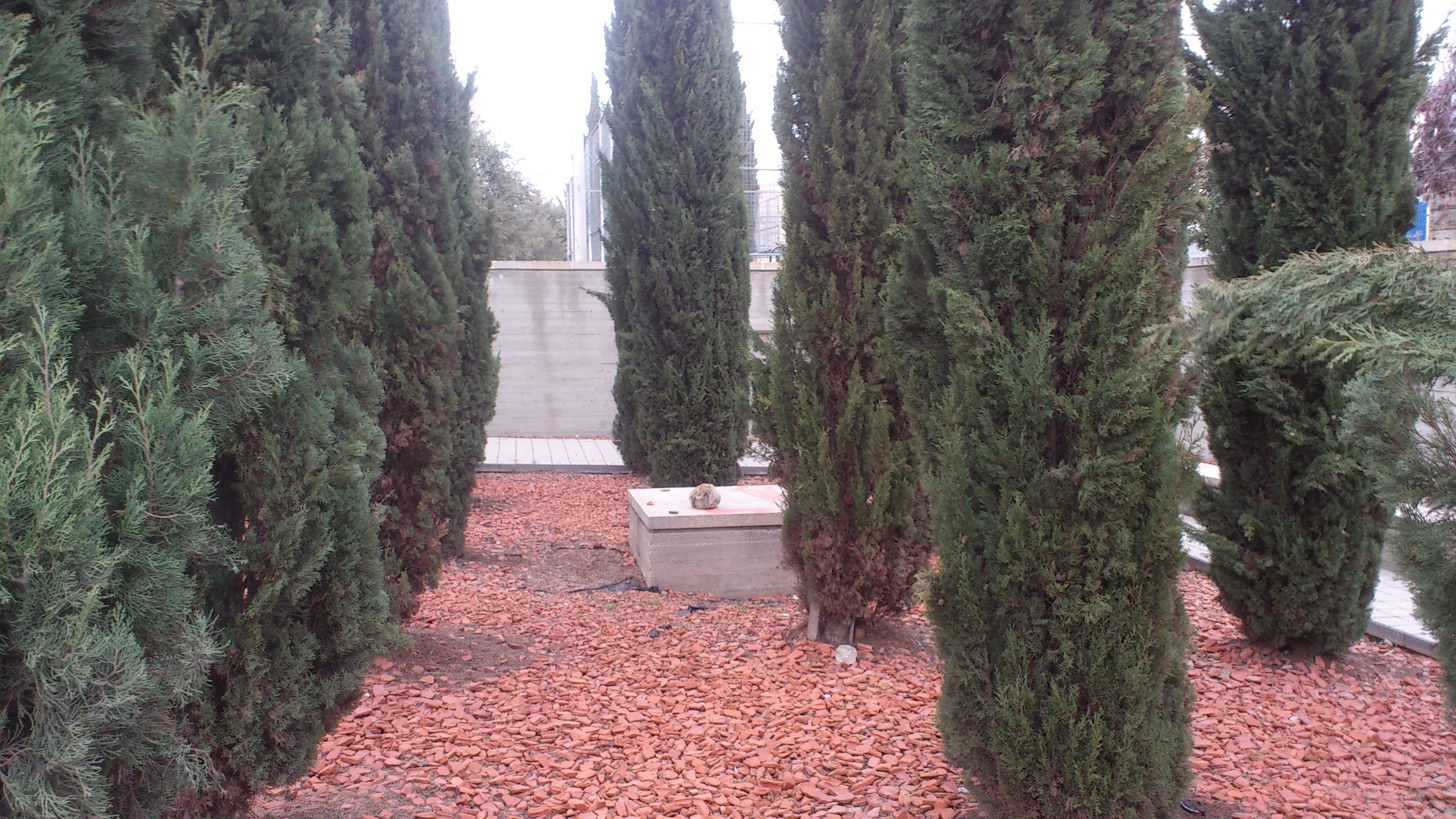

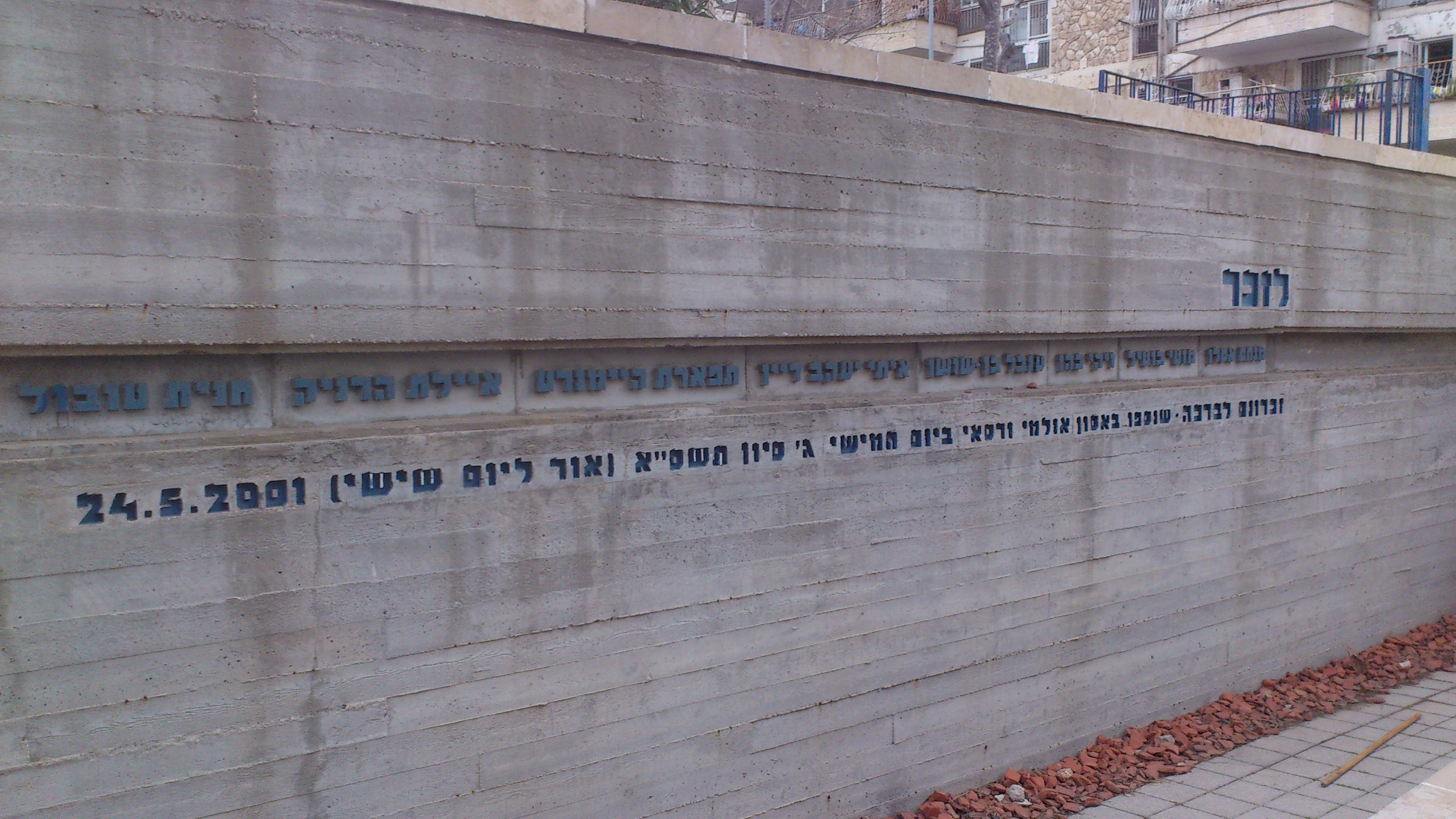

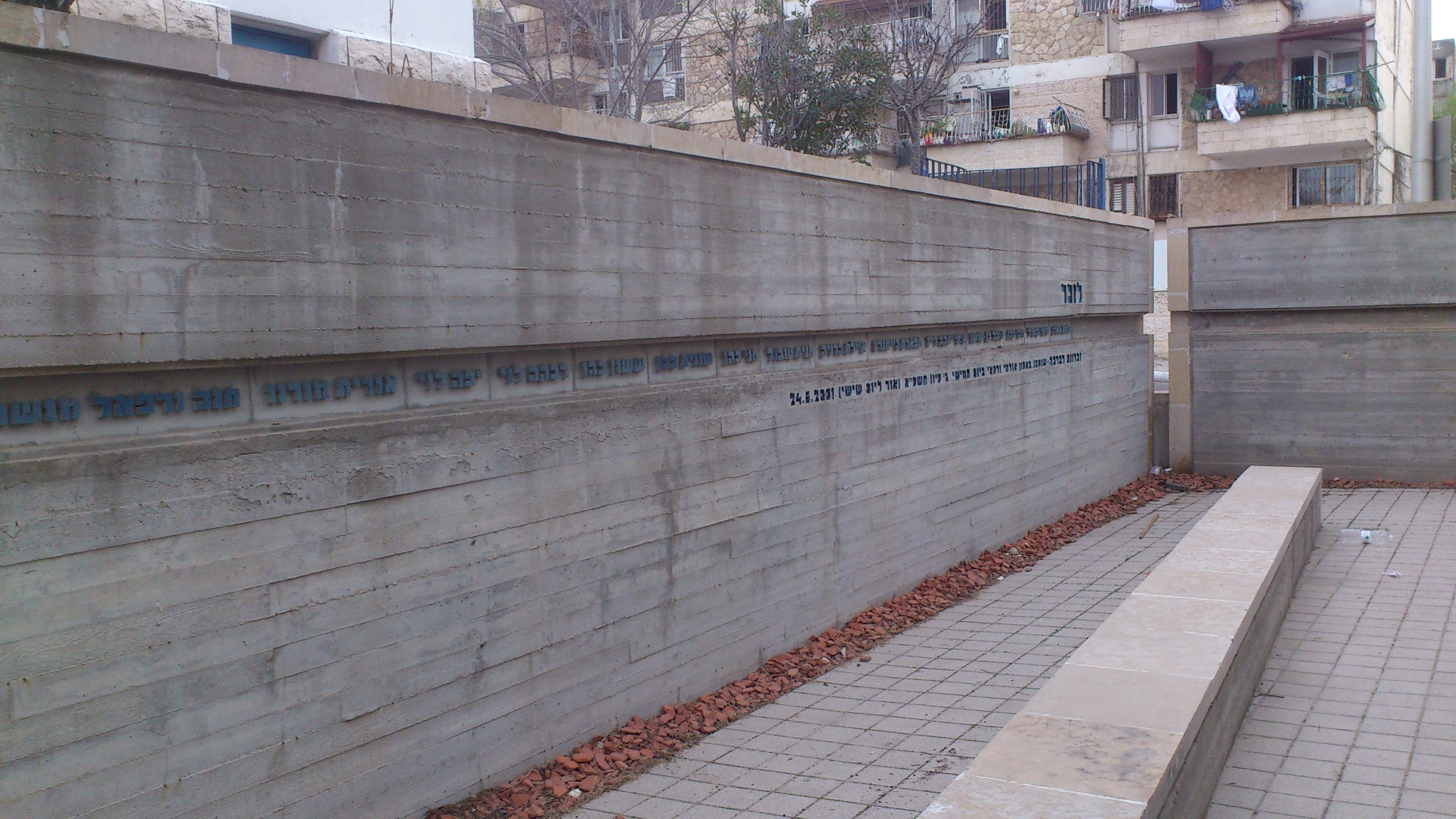

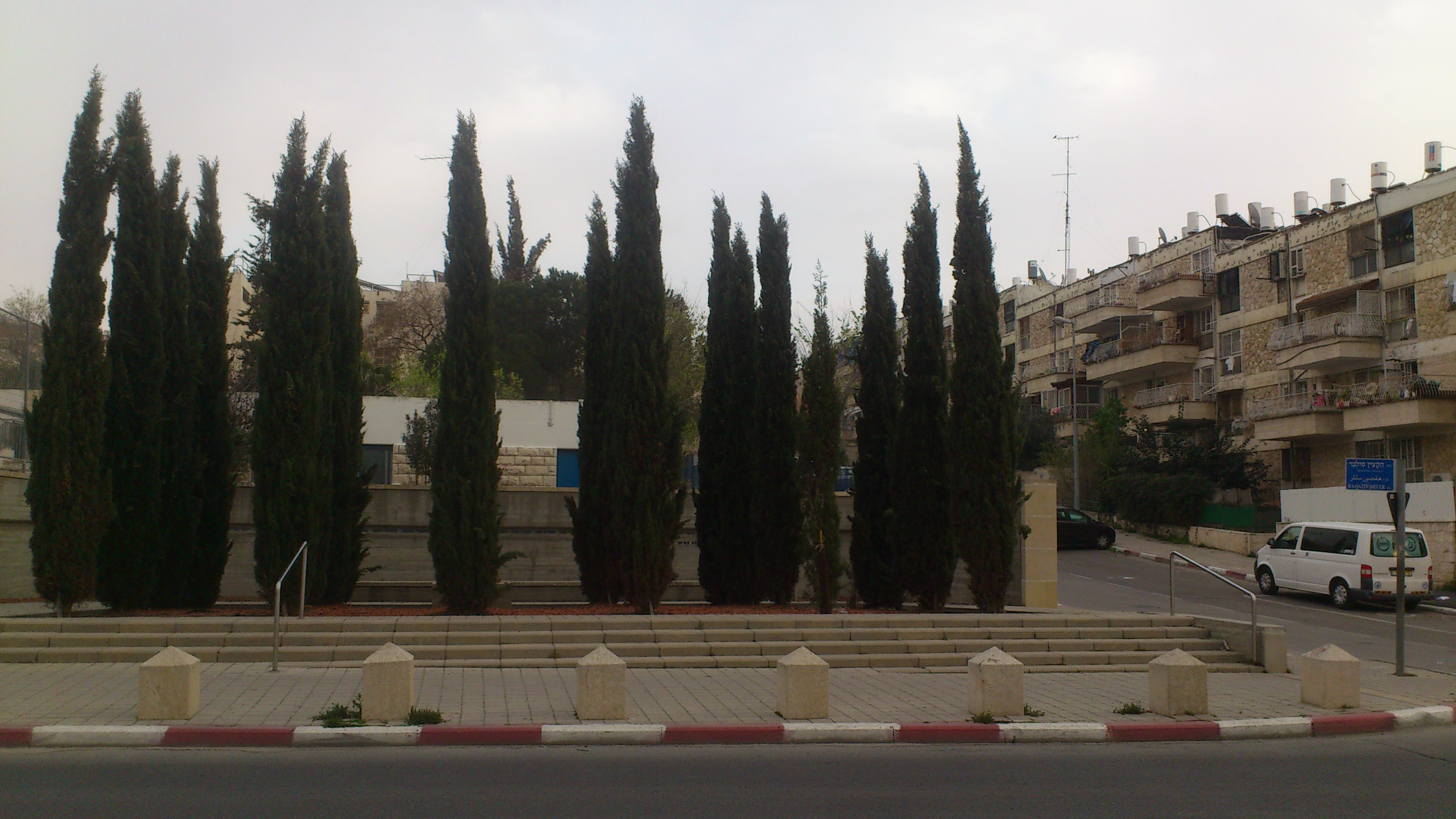

== See also ==
- Structural failure
- List of structural failures and collapses
- Hyatt Regency walkway collapse, a similar incident that occurred 20 years prior that was due to insufficient load capacity as a result of negligent design flaws.
- Erfurt latrine disaster, a floor collapse that occurred on 26 July 1184

== Notes ==
- Levinson, Jay. "Review of Press Coverage: The Versailles Hall Disaster," Disaster Prevention & Management, Volume 10:4 (2001), pp. 289–290.
