= Ahmed Ghandour (militant) =

Hamas militant leader (1967–2023)

Ahmed Abu Ghandour
- أحمد أبو غندور
- Born: Ahmed Abu Ghandour c. 1967; Jaffa, Israel
- Died: 10 November 2023 (aged 55–56); Gaza Strip
- Cause of death: Israeli airstrike
- Other name: Abu Anas al-Ghandour
- Military career
- Allegiance: Hamas
- Military wing: Izz al-Din al-Qassam Brigades
- Years of service: 1980s–2023
- Rank: Commander
- Unit: Northern Gaza Brigade
- Commands: Northern Gaza Brigade
- Known for: Senior Hamas commander; close confidant of Mohammed Deif; role in 2006 Gaza cross-border raid
- Conflicts: Second Intifada; 2004 Israeli operation in the northern Gaza Strip; 2006 Gaza cross-border raid; Gaza war
- Other work: Member of Hamas Shura Council and Political Bureau

Ahmed Abu Ghandour, also known as Abu Anas al-Ghandour (c. 1967 – 10 November 2023), was a Palestinian senior militant in the Izz al-Din al-Qassam Brigades, the military wing of Hamas. As commander of the Northern Gaza Brigade, he was a member of the Al-Qassam Brigades' General Military Council and was considered to be a close confidant of Hamas military commander Mohammed Deif. In 2017, Ghandour was designated by the United States as a Specially Designated Global Terrorist. In November 2023, he was killed by an Israeli airstrike amid the Gaza war.

== Biography ==
Ghandour was born in approximately 1967 in Jaffa, Israel. Ghandour was detained in Israel between 1988 and 1994, after which he was in Palestinian Authority detention from 1995 to 2000. He was released after the outbreak of the Second Intifada. In 2002, he survived the first assassination attempt by Israel.

By 2003, Ghandour was a close aide to Hamas bombmaker Adnan al-Ghoul. After an attack by Hamas militants on an Israeli tank in February 2003, the Israel Defense Forces (IDF) demolished Ghandour's house in the Sheik Radwan neighborhood of Gaza City. Israel believed Ghandour was responsible for planning the attack.

By 2004, Ghandour commanded the Northern Branch of the Izz al-Din al-Qassam Brigades. In this role, he was the senior Hamas battlefield commander during the 2004 Israeli operation in the northern Gaza Strip and was involved in leading a number of operations including the 2006 Gaza cross-border raid that led to the abduction of Israeli soldier Gilad Shalit. Ghandour was targeted for assassination again in 2012. According to the IDF assessments, Ghandour dispatched the five Nukhba forces militants who attempted to infiltrate Israel in the 2014 Zikim attack during the 2014 Gaza war.

According to the United States government, Ghandour was part of the Hamas Shura Council and Political Bureau. By 2017, he was a member of the General Military Council of the brigades and was considered to be a close confidant of Mohammed Deif.

The U.S. State Department designated Ghandour as a Specially Designated Global Terrorist (SDGT) on 6 April 2017. He was the fifth senior Hamas member designated as a SDGT. In response, Hamas called the U.S. move "unethical" and held a solidarity sit-in at Ghandour's house in the Jabaliya refugee camp.

== Death ==
The IDF killed Ghandour and his deputy Wael Rajab in an airstrike on 10 November 2023 during the Gaza war. Three Israeli hostages were also killed in the attack: Elia Toledano, Nik Beizer, and Ron Sherman.
