= Eitan AFV =

Israeli 8 wheel drive armoured fighting vehicle

Eitan
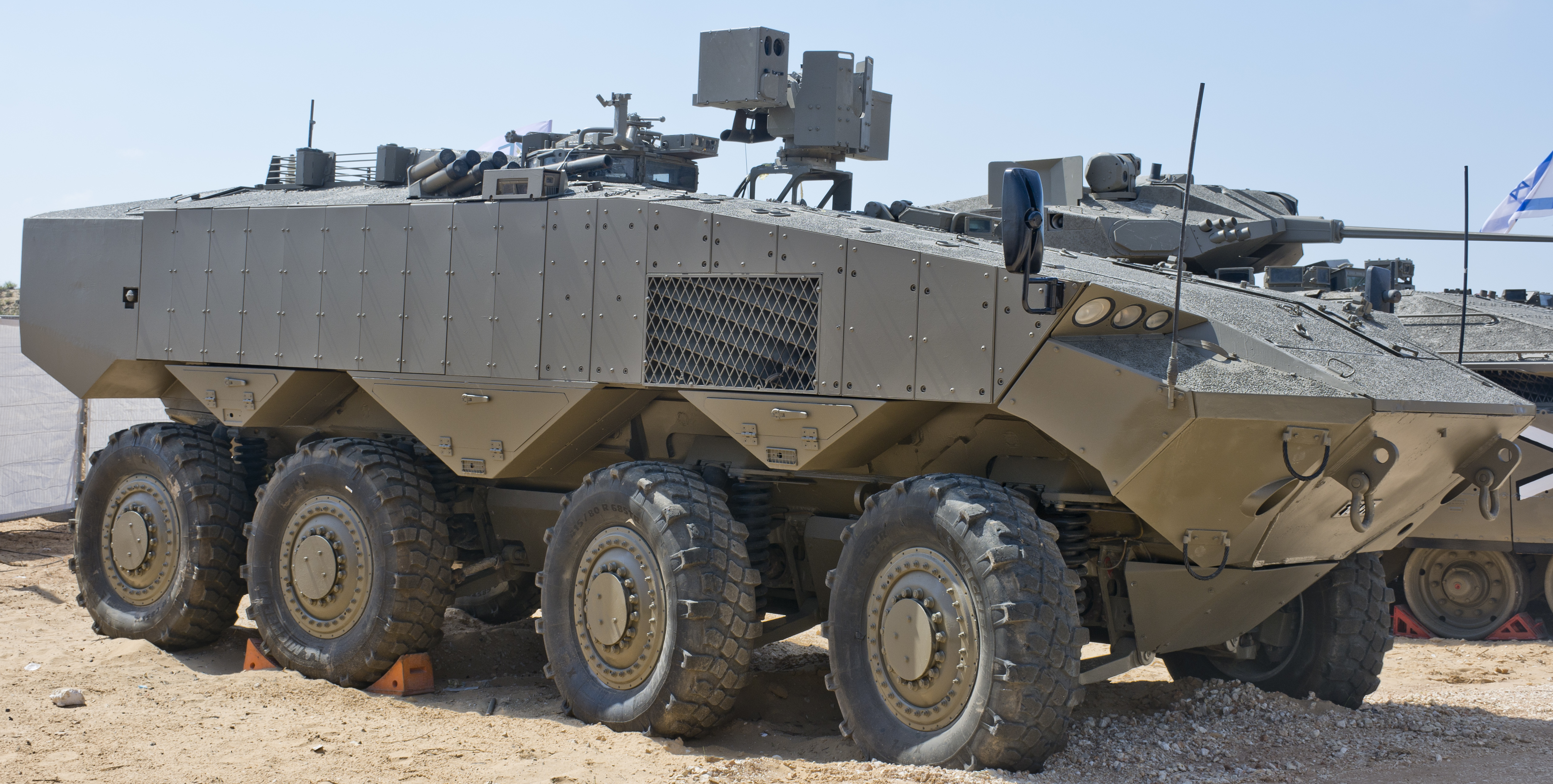
- Type: Armoured fighting vehicle
- Place of origin: Israel / United States

Service history
- In service: Since May 2023
- Used by: Israel Defense Forces
- Wars: Gaza war

Production history
- Designer: Ministry’s Tank Development Program Directorate (Mantak)
- Designed: 2016
- Manufacturer: 60 % Oshkosh; Allison Elbit Rafael MTU
- Unit cost: US$5 million
- Produced: Since 2020 (serial production)
- Variants: Armoured personnel carrier; Infantry fighting vehicle

Specifications
- Mass: up to 50 tonnes
- Length: 8.0 m (26.2 ft)
- Width: 3.0 m (9.8 ft)
- Height: 3.0 m (9.8 ft)
- Crew: (commander, driver, RCWS operator)
- Passengers: 9 troops
- Armor: Iron Fist Light Decoupled APS
- Main armament: Samson RCWS (Katlanit) with a M2 machine gun (APC variant)
- Secondary armament: Pintle-mounted 7.62mm NATO machine gun (APC variant)
- Engine: MTU 6V890 diesel engine 6.67-litre 750 PS (552 kW)
- Transmission: Allison 4800 SP
- Suspension: 8×8
- Operational range: 1,000 km (620 mi)
- Maximum speed: 90 km/h (56 mph)

Eitan (Hebrew for "steadfast", "firm" or "strong") is an armoured fighting vehicle (AFV) developed by the Merkava and Armoured Vehicles Directorate in the IMOD to replace the ageing M113 armoured personnel carrier in use by the Israel Defense Forces. Its armored personnel carrier (APC) variant lacks the Iron Fist APS, due to the fact those are not the serial production Eitan vehicles yet. The infantry fighting vehicle (IFV) variant is still not in service.

== Overview ==
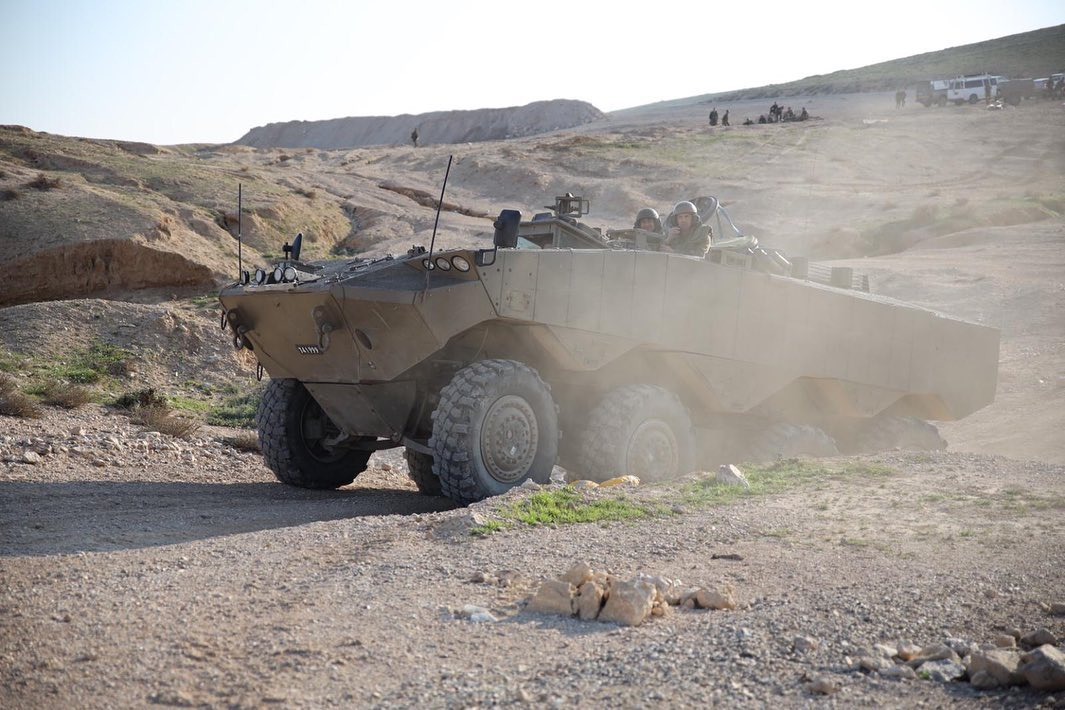
An Eitan of the Nahal Brigade in 2020

The Eitan is an 8-wheeled vehicle much lighter than any other 8- wheeled AFV Israel has produced Namer, weighing less than 35 tons, fitted with the Iron Fist Light Decoupled active protection system. The AFV has a top speed of 90 km/h and can carry up to 12 soldiers including 3 crew. The Eitan can be equipped with a 30–40 mm gun and a missile firing position with 2 Spike missiles. The armour is rated to the standard STANAG 4569 level 4.

The Eitan will replace hundreds of M113 APC currently in service. According to Brigadier General Baruch Matzliah, the vehicle will complement, not replace, the Namer tracked APC; as a wheeled vehicle, it will cost half as much as the Namer ($3 million) and, unlike tracked vehicles, can transport infantry squads on roads without relying on tank transporters.

The Eitan has the capability to use run-flat tires and is designed with a NERA composite armour and high floor to protect from landmine and IED blast effects. The first Eitan AFV was unveiled on August 1, 2016.

Serial production started in 2022, and the Nahal Brigade became the first Israeli infantry unit to receive the Eitan in May 2023. The brigade first used the Eitan during the Battle of Zikim on 7 October 2023, and there were plans to use the vehicle in the subsequent invasion of the Gaza Strip.

== See also ==
- KTO Rosomak – (Poland)
- BTR 4 – (Ukraine)
- Boxer – (Germany, Netherlands)
- CM-32 – (Taiwan)
- FNSS PARS III – (Turkey)
- Freccia – (Italy)
- Iveco SuperAV – (Italy)
- K808 White Tiger – (South Korea)
- LAV 6 – (Canada)
- Mowag Piranha IV – (Switzerland)
- Mowag Piranha V – (Switzerland)
- Otokar Arma – (Turkey)
- Pandur II – (Austria)
- Patria AMV – (Finland)
- Stryker – (United States, Canada)
- TATA Kestrel – (India)
- Terrex ICV – (Singapore)
- VBCI – (France)
- VPK-7829 Bumerang – (Russia)
