= Zikim attack =

2023 military engagement near Zikim, Israel

- Part of the October 7 attacks
Date	7 October 2023
Location	Near Zikim, Southern District, Israel 31°36′28″N 34°31′18″E
Result	Hamas fails to capture the Zikim training base and Zikim kibbutz

Belligerents
Hamas	Israel

Commanders and leaders
(Hamas) Ahmed Musa	(Israel) Lt. Col. Shay (Israel) Capt. Adir Abudi † (Israel) First Lt. Or Moses †; Col. Eitan Paz (Ashdod naval base commander)

Units involved
Al-Qassam Brigades: Qassam naval commandos (Note: Arabic: كوماندوز القسام البحري, romanized: Komandoz al Qassam al Bahri, lit. 'Qassam naval commandos or Qassam marine commandos'.)	(Israel) Israeli Defence Forces; On the coast: Israeli Navy: Squadron 916; Snapir unit; 51st Battalion, Golani Brigade At training base: Officer staff of the Tavor company, Home Front search and rescue brigade At Yiftach: 77th Battalion, 7th Brigade Outside kibbutz: Civilian security team

Strength
38 cross Israeli maritime border on boats, 16 of whom land on beach Dozens cross into Israel by land	At training base: 14 soldiers in combat 90 recruits and 30 administrative staff sheltering in place At Yiftach: 5 soldiers in combat Majority of garrison sheltering in place On coast: 4 soldiers

Casualties and losses
At sea: 2 boats sunk 38 killed in total: At training base: 13–15 killed At Yiftach: Multiple killed On coast: 2–3 killed Outside kibbutz: Multiple killed	At training base: 7 killed 7 wounded At Yiftach: 7 killed Multiple wounded On coast: 17 civilians killed 1 soldier killed Outside kibbutz: 2 wounded
- Site of the attack in Israel

The Zikim Attack was a seaborne attack by Hamas militants on Israeli defense forces and civilians near Zikim Israel as part of the as part of the 7 October 2023 attack on Israel from the Gaza Strip. Fighting took place at the Zikim Training Base, at two other military outposts, and at Zikim Kibbutz. In the assault, 17 Israeli civilians were massacred on Zikim Beach.

== Background ==
The Zikim training base, also known as Bahad 4, is located eight kilometers south of Ashkelon and five kilometers north of Gaza City. During the 2014 Gaza War, the Israeli military repelled an amphibious assault on the base.

The base is used to train the search and rescue brigade of the IDF Home Front; 90 new recruits who had been drafted in August were on the base at the time of the attack. It is one of three military bases in the vicinity of kibbutz Zikim, in addition to the Yiftach and Erez outposts. The latter, a former naval base, is 100 meters from the coastline, and had been manned by soldiers of the 51st Battalion of the Golani Brigade in the months prior to the war.

Zikim beach, the southernmost beach in the country, had been considered very popular among residents of southern Israel.

== Assaults on military bases ==
On the morning of 7 October, at 6:30 AM local time, the Zikim training base was struck with what its commander called an "insane volley" of rockets, concurrent with the heavy artillery barrages targeting Sderot and other communities across the Gaza envelope signaling the commencement of Operation al-Aqsa Flood.

In response to the surprise bombardment, new recruits on patrol duty at the base's perimeter fence were immediately sequestered in safe areas and replaced by junior officers by 6:36. The base's garrison began hearing gunfire from the direction of nearby military bases at 6:45.

Al Qassam, the military wing of the Hamas movement, referred to the team who stormed the base as "Qassam naval commandos" Arabic: كوماندوز القسام البحري, romanized: Komandoz al Qassam al Bahri.

Observers at the Yiftach outpost witnessed dozens of Hamas fighters breaking through the Gaza–Israel barrier, armed with RPGs and driving motorcycles, trucks, and tractors towards their outpost. They arrived outside Yiftach's gate by 7:00, and Naama Boni, 19, the only sentinel, called for reinforcements. She was soon met by three young soldiers who rushed to the gate without uniforms and a member of the 13th Battalion of the Golani Brigade who had been positioned in the rear guard. The remainder of the garrison chose to shelter in place, and the five defenders were quickly overwhelmed by numerically superior Hamas forces and killed. Inside the outpost, two soldiers died and several were injured in intermittent clashes that lasted for twelve hours, though Hamas never breached the base's command post.

Combat on the Zikim training base began at 7:30, when patrol teams at two separate locations spotted militants and reported incoming fire. The two highest-ranking officers on the training base at the time of the assault, company commander Capt. Adir Abudi, 23, and deputy company commander First Lt. Or Moses, 20, were killed in combat at "Position 6," where three other officers were wounded. A sentry post at the base's firing range was overrun once its defenders ran out of ammunition after 45 minutes of clashes; four officers were killed and two wounded in its defense.

The fall of the firing range marked Hamas's first successful incursion into the training base, though they did not go on to attempt to take over other positions, which base commander Lt. Col. Shay ascribed to casualties and exhaustion. A single Hamas fighter managed to breach one of the "safe areas" where recruits were sheltering, killing an 18-year-old private who had been drafted two months prior before being killed by another recruit.

Shay, who was at home in Sderot at the time of the attack, requested support from the nearby military bases, but realized that there was "no one to talk to" as they were also under assault. The other two bases in the area were eventually overrun amid serious losses of Israeli life.

== Naval incursion and landing ==
Amid the 6:30 rocket barrage, which also targeted Israeli naval facilities, the Israeli Navy detected an infiltration from the sea. According to the IDF, the force consisted of seven boats (six rubber boats and one fishing boat), each moving at a speed of 30 knots, which were carrying a total of 38 fighters from the Nukhba unit of Hamas' military wing, the Al-Qassam Brigades. The attack force had initially concealed itself amid a group of Gazan civilian fishing boats before heading towards the Israeli coast. At 6:33, the Ashdod Naval Base issued an alert declaring a terrorist infiltration from the sea. At 6:37, the Israeli Navy requested that the Israel Police evacuate Zikim beach and called on the Gaza Division to send infantry forces to secure the shore. Col. Eitan Paz, commander of the Ashdod Naval Base, having been forewarned of the invasion by Gaza Division commander Brig. Gen. Avi Rosenfeld earlier in the morning, immediately ordered the forces under his command to defend the Israeli maritime border and prevent raids on the coast.

The Israeli Navy deployed two Dvora-class fast patrol boats of the 916th Patrol Squadron from the Ashdod Naval Base to intercept the attackers. The patrol boats destroyed two of the boats at sea before they reached the shore, and sailors of the Snapir unit, the Israeli Navy's protection and harbor security unit, subsequently moved in on Defender-class boats and killed the survivors as well as Hamas divers they discovered with gunfire and depth charges, and three of the remaining boats were hit as they were landing. A total of 22 Hamas fighters were killed before they could land. Two boats managed to reach the shore without being targeted.

=== Zikim beach ===
During the assault, 16 Hamas militants landed on Zikim Beach and killed 17 civilian beachgoers including fishermen, teenagers on a camping trip, and a group that had a beach party the previous night. Some 20-30 civilians managed to flee the beach and take refuge in the Zikim training base, where they were kept in a secure area with the new recruits.

Hearing the shooting, four soldiers of the Golani Brigade's 51st battalion stationed at the Erez base went out to the beach in a military vehicle to investigate. Realizing they were outnumbered, three of them retreated and left the vehicle behind while one, Cpl. Dvir Lisha, moved to engage the Hamas fighters and was killed.

Most of the attacking militants would be killed in clashes on Israeli territory but two managed to return to Gaza where they were later killed. Two or three were killed by naval gunfire shortly after landing, but the rest began killing civilians on the beach. Reinforcements from the Nahal Brigade were sent to Zikim beach in Eitan AFVs, which drove on Highway 6 at speeds of up to 120 km/h. The Nahal Brigade soldiers killed several militants on the beach before moving forward to support other units.

=== Kibbutz Zikim ===
The bulk of the remaining Hamas fighters were eventually killed while attempting to enter kibbutz Zikim. The kibbutz's emergency response team had been alerted to the infiltration by the navy and preemptively positioned themselves along a fence surrounding the kibbutz. A squad of six Hamas militants arrived at the kibbutz driving the Israeli military vehicle that had been abandoned on the beach. A firefight quickly ensued, and the militants dispersed, eventually being tracked down and killed after about an hour of combat. The security team remained at their positions until 2:30 the next morning, assisting in the evacuation of civilians and awaiting IDF reinforcements that never arrived.

== Aftermath ==
After the assaults on the military bases, Sayeret Maglan and Shayetet 13 forces secured the area, deployed along the Gaza border fence, and assisted in the evacuation of civilians and recruits.

The commander of the Zikim training base, Lt. Col. Shay, credited the resistance there with preventing massacres in Zikim, Karmia, and Ashkelon. Israeli Minister of Defense Yoav Gallant made similar comments about the garrison of Yiftach camp, saying they "obtained life for the civilians who live a bit further away."

Fighting at Zikim beach on 7 October is notable for involving the first-ever use of the Israeli Eitan AFV in combat, which was originally scheduled to have been put into operation in 2024. The successful use of the vehicle at Zikim beach prompted Tamir Yadai, head of IDF Ground Forces Command, to integrate the Eitan into plans for the invasion of the Gaza Strip.

On 10 November 2023, the IDF announced that Ahmed Musa, a company commander in the Nukhba unit who was among the leaders of the attack, was killed in a raid by Israeli ground forces in Jabaliya.

=== Subsequent infiltrations ===
On the morning of 8 October, the 916th Patrol Squadron killed five Hamas militants on Zikim beach.

On 10 October, the IDF's official Hebrew-language Twitter account claimed that troops from the Bislamach Brigade's 17th Battalion had clashed with Hamas militants in the Zikim beach area, killing four. According to an investigation by France 24, the video appeared to show Israeli soldiers killing four Palestinian men who were attempting to surrender. France 24 also states that there were no clearly visible weapons in the drone shot of the initial encounter, "though the images are blurry and it is impossible to see whether weapons were on the scene." The incident was geolocated by Al Jazeera English to an area about a kilometer southwest of the Zikim training base.

On 11 October, the IDF claimed to have killed eight Hamas militants in Zikim.

On 13 October, a suspected security incident forced residents of Zikim inside their homes. Israel National News later reported that a militant had been killed on the beach by the IDF.

On 16 October, reports cited by the Institute for the Study of War suggested that two militants from the Gaza Strip infiltrated the coastline west of Zikim, and were subsequently killed by an IDF helicopter.

Israeli authorities issued an infiltration warning for Zikim on 24 October after the Israeli Navy engaged a group of Hamas divers attempting to enter Israel by sea. Israeli media sources subsequently reported that at least four Hamas fighters were killed, while one report put the figure at eight. Israeli fighter jets subsequently bombed the base in Gaza from which the divers set out. The IDF noted that it was still monitoring the area for militants who may have escaped initial engagements.

== See also ==
- Outline of the Gaza war
- Palestinian political violence
- Moshe Dayan's eulogy for Ro'i Rothberg
