= Ayman Nofal =

Hamas senior commander (1974–2023)

- أيمن نوفل
- Born: 13 May 1974; Bureij, Israeli-occupied Gaza Strip
- Died: 17 October 2023 (aged 49); Bureij, Gaza Strip

Ayman Nofal (Arabic: أيمن نوفل; 13 May 1974 – 17 October 2023) was a Palestinian senior commander in Al-Qassam Brigades, the militant arm of Hamas. Nofal was a member of the group's General Military Council, head of its Central Gaza Brigade, and head of air operations. He was killed during the Gaza war.

== Biography ==
By 2008, Nofal was a leader in the Al-Qassam Brigades, as a field commander in central Gaza. Nofal was arrested along with 200 other Palestinians in the northern Egyptian city of Al-Arish in the Sinai Peninsula by Egyptian security forces in early 2008. After Palestinian militants blasted open a hole in the Egypt-Gaza barrier in protest of Egypt's cooperation with Israel in January 2008, hundreds of Palestinians, including Nofal, crossed the border into Egypt.

While many of the other Palestinian border crossers were released, as a wanted person by Israel, Nofal remained in Egyptian custody. According to Al Jazeera, Egyptian authorities believed Nofal was planning to kill members of Fatah or was involved in weapons smuggling from Egypt to Gaza. Hamas denied Nofal's involvement in these activities. Egyptian authorities were reportedly interested in Nofal's knowledge of Hamas' missile capabilities, the location of captured Israeli soldier Gilad Shalit, and locations of senior Hamas militant leaders such as Mohammed Deif and Ahmed al-Jabari. Nofal escaped from al-Marj Prison in February 2011 during the 2011 Egyptian revolution. Nofal was smuggled back to Gaza via a smuggling tunnel and received a hero's welcome from Hamas upon his return.

After Ahmed Jabari was killed in an airstrike in November 2012, as part of Operation Pillar of Defense, Nofal was considered as a possible successor as Hamas's military chief. Other possible successors included Imad Akel, Central Brigade commander Ahmed Ghandour, and Mohammed Abu-Shamala.

Nofal led the Palestinian Joint Operations Room, an alliance of Palestinian nationalist factions, including Islamic and secular groups.

=== Gaza war ===
By 2023, Nofal was a member of the Al-Qassam Brigades's General Military Council. In this role, he also directed its relations with other militant organizations via the Palestinian Joint Operations Room. During the Gaza war, Nofal was a commander of the Central Gaza Brigade.

On 17 October 2023, a statement from Hamas confirmed his death in an airstrike. According to the IDF, on 17 October, he was killed in an airstrike. An unnamed source from the Israeli military said that in order to kill Nofal the military knowingly authorized a strike that they knew would kill approximately 300 other people. Four multi-story apartment buildings were destroyed in the strike. Only 70 bodies were recovered from the site on the first day, but locals in Gaza continued digging through the rubble of the building for 5 days, and believed some bodies remained under the rubble months later in April 2024.

After his death, the U.S. Department of the Treasury's Office of Foreign Assets Control (OFAC) designated Nofal a Specially Designated Global Terrorist for his role on Hamas's General Military Council and as its commander of military relations.
