= Pal-Kal =

Construction method for concrete ceilings

Pal-Kal (Hebrew: פל קל) was a construction method for concrete ceilings, invented by engineer Eli Ron in the late 1970s (Israel Patent No. 104,101).

The Pal-Kal method offered an easier, faster, and cheaper solution for casting ceilings compared to traditional reinforced concrete slabs. However, certain applications of this method were proven to be extremely dangerous, and the use of non-standard Pal-Kal ceilings was the main cause of the collapse of the Versailles wedding hall disaster.

== Construction method ==
The basic principle of the Pal-Kal method involved using galvanized steel boxes inside the concrete, replacing the steel rods intended for reinforcement against bending and the upper reinforcement rods. The shape of the concrete poured between the steel boxes was similar to that obtained in a regular ribbed ceiling. In some Pal-Kal ceilings, there was also a thin layer of concrete underneath. The galvanized boxes were placed with the opening facing downwards and with spaces between them. The concrete was poured between and above the boxes. The boxes created air spaces within the ceiling while providing sufficient static thickness. The galvanized steel acted as formwork and also served as reinforcement against bending. In some non-standard Pal-Kal ceilings, the boxes replaced the reinforcement stirrups designed to prevent shearing.

Various versions of the Pal-Kal construction were developed over time, with different combinations of galvanized boxes and different concrete sections, with or without additional steel reinforcement:

1. Pal-Kal ceiling in a T-section with standard reinforcement stirrups and horizontal reinforcement in its bottom thin layer of concrete.
2. Pal-Kal ceiling in an I-section with standard reinforcement stirrups.
3. Pal-Kal ceiling in an I-section without reinforcement stirrups.
4. Pal-Kal ceiling in an I-section with non-compliant reinforcement stirrups.

Versions 1 and 2 included reinforcement stirrups that provided shear resistance, and such ceilings were considered standard. Versions 3 and 4, without reinforcement stirrups, were non-standard and even hazardous.

Construction process of Pal-Kal ceilings began with the pouring of a very thin layer of non-structural concrete with minimal reinforcement. The role of this concrete was not structural. Above or into this initial concrete layer, the galvanized boxes were inserted in the shape of the letter 'ח' (Chet in Hebrew). Then, additional concrete was poured above the boxes to create the final rigid ceiling. The galvanized steel's function was to ensure better adhesion between it and the concrete.

== Problems ==
1. Lack of shear resistance: The galvanized boxes could not withstand shear forces as designed reinforcement stirrups would. The attachment of the boxes to the initial thin concrete layer was weak and imprecise. In a later version of Pal-Kal, additional shear reinforcement in the form of a ladder was added, but it was not adequately anchored to provide its intended constructive role.
2. Carrying capacity of the lower concrete layer, with its thickness of about 5–6 cm, was compromised once the boxes were inserted.
3. The quality of galvanized steel used in Pal-Kal was much lower compared to standard steel used for reinforcement in concrete.
4. Corrosion issues: The air spaces created within the ceiling allowed for the accumulation of water, leading to corrosion without visible signs.
5. Construction of Pal-Kal ceilings involved multi-stage pouring with significant time gaps between them. If the second pouring was delayed by even a few hours, the initially poured concrete would set partially, creating a weak point in the concrete (whose strength could not be measured).
6. Pal-Kal ceilings did not allow early detection of problems like cracks and corrosion.

== Versailles wedding hall disaster ==
In 2001, a Pal-Kal ceiling collapsed while guests were dancing on it at the Versailles wedding hall in Jerusalem, resulting in the death of 23 people. The collapse was caused by multiple factors, including the non-standard construction of the ceiling. Shortly before the disaster, a wall supporting the ceiling on the second floor was removed, allowing the ceiling to start sinking. During the wedding, additional weight was added when people were dancing, leading to the sudden collapse of the structure.

Following the disaster, legal actions were taken against those responsible. The hall owners were found guilty of manslaughter and received two and a half years of imprisonment. Eli Ron, the engineer who invented the Pal-Kal method, and three other engineers were also found guilty of manslaughter. The engineers received a sentence of 22 months, while Eli Ron was sentenced to four years in prison.

== Safety certification ==
Pal-Kal structures deemed unsafe are forbidden for use and are often demolished. To prevent unnecessary demolitions, safety tests can be conducted on the structure. A Pal-Kal structure that passes this test is as safe as buildings constructed using traditional methods. Nowadays, most municipalities require annual safety checks to detect potential problems in Pal-Kal structures. However, some engineers argue that a single safety test is sufficient and annual checks are unnecessary.

== Additional buildings ==
Following the Versailles disaster, other buildings constructed using the Pal-Kal method were inspected, and some of them were closed for use until repairs were completed. In certain buildings, the cost of these repairs reached millions of shekels.

== See also ==
- Architecture of Israel
