= Camp Ariel Sharon =

Israeli military base complex

Coordinates: 31.0600°N 34.8461°E

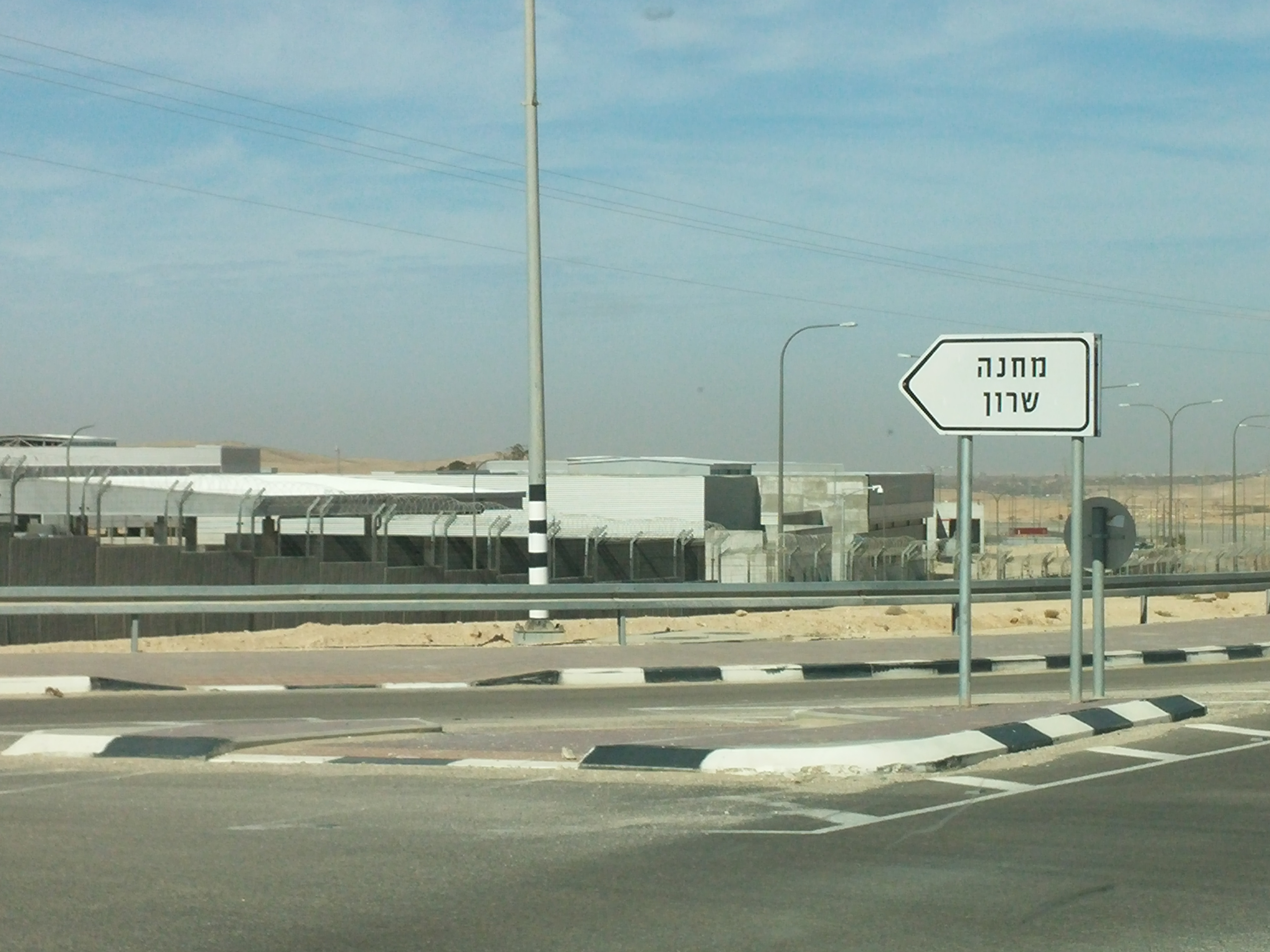
Camp Ariel Sharon

Camp Ariel Sharon (Hebrew: מחנה אריאל שרון, Mahane Ariel Sharon), also called the City of Training Bases (Hebrew: עיר הבה"דים, Ir HaBahadim), is a complex of military bases being built in southern Israel, belonging to the Israel Defense Forces and named after the former Major General and Prime Minister Ariel Sharon. It is a NIS 50 billion project.

Upon completion, it will be the largest military base in the country, with the ability to house over 10,000 recruits in training. The base is located near Yeruham and next to the Negev Junction of roads 40 and 224.

The base will serve as an umbrella training facility, housing training bases 6, 7, 10, 11, 13, 20 and other training bases, including noncombat recruit training bases. It will cover a built-up area of 230 dunams (230,000 m^{2})

== History ==
The Planning Directorate of the Israel Defense Forces in 2002 formulated the project as part of a multi-year plan. The cornerstone was laid on December 1, 2003, and the Israeli cabinet approved the project in April 2007.

The headquarters of the base was inaugurated in November 2014. The Adjutant Corps School will move into the base in February 2015, followed by the Military Police School.

== Planning and construction ==
The View to the Negev concern, which comprises Minrav, Binat and Electra, is building the project and will maintain it for 25 years, at a cost of NIS 12 billion, under a private-public partnership.

The architect Ofer Kolker designed the base overall. Participating architectural firms include Zarhi Architects, Bar Hana Architects and the architect Shlomo Gendler.

The complex is planned to consist of 120 buildings. This includes 31 residential buildings, a dining room and kitchen, a conference hall, a commercial center, 12 schools, 12 technical workshops and logistics centers, 11 electrical substations, and some synagogues.

The City of Training Bases will be largely closed to private vehicles. A bike share program is being considered for the permanent staff of the base to get around. The base itself will be served by a transportation hub that will replace the existing hub in Camp Natan (Beersheba), and later by a railway line.

=== Environmental planning ===
The planning was made around the Sekher Stream which passes through the base. A hill was created from the excess earth dug up during construction. Thousands of trees and over 100,000 plants will be planted throughout the base. According to landscape architect Izzy Blanc, The base will largely resemble an urban park. The water used to water the plants will be reclaimed water.

Each building on the campus will have an energy usage meter, and planners hope this will encourage conservation among soldiers.

== Bases and facilities ==
The City of Training Bases will house the following military bases:

- The School for Logistics (Bahad 6), moving from Camp Yigael Yadin (Tzrifin)
- The School for Telecommunications (Bahad 7), moving from Tzrifin
- The School for Medicine (Bahad 10), moving from Tzrifin
- The Adjutant Corps School (Bahad 11), moving from Tzrifin
- The Military Police School (Bahad 13), moving from Camp Mota Gur
- The Ordnance Corps School (Bahad 20), moving from Tzrifin
- The Education Corps School, moving from Camp Sha'arei Avraham
- The Liaison (COGAT) School
- A recruit training base that will replace Camp Dotan ("Camp 80") and Batar Nitzanim

The hill made from the excess earth will contain a monument to the late Israeli general and prime minister Ariel Sharon.

== Structure and command ==
Below is a list of commanders for the base:

Name	Tenure	Source
Danny Moshayov	2014–2016	
Avi Motola	2016–	

== Impact ==
The base, one of the biggest in Israel, is expected to create many jobs in the remote area where it is being built, especially in Yeruham.
