= Ali Al Qadi =

Hamas militant (1988–2023)

- علي القاضي
- Born: 1988; Al Bireh, Ramallah
- Died: 14 October 2023 (aged 34–35); Gaza Strip
- Occupation: Senior commander
- Political party: Hamas

Ali Mohammad Ali Al Qadi (Arabic: علي محمد علي القاضي; 1988 – 14 October 2023) was a Palestinian militant who was a senior commander in the Nukhba special forces unit of Hamas. He was involved in the planning of the 7 October attacks in Israel. Qadhi was from Al Bireh in the West Bank. In 2005, Israel arrested Qadhi for his involvement in the kidnapping and murder of Sasson Nuriel.

He was released in 2011 as part of the Gilad Shalit prisoner exchange. As part of the prisoner exchange, he was deported to Gaza.

On 14 October 2023, the Israel Defense Forces announced that Qadhi was killed in a drone attack.
