= Samar Sabih =

Hamas bombmaker (born 1983)

Samar Ibrahim Sabih (born 1983) is a Palestinian member of Hamas. She is believed to be the militant group's first female bombmaker, for which she was imprisoned by Israel between 2005 and 2007.

== Biography ==
According to the Shin Bet, Sabih was recruited by Hamas in 2003 in the Jabaliya refugee camp in Gaza and became the group's first female bombmaker. Sabih had been studying at the Islamic University of Gaza. Hamas then sent Sabih from Gaza to the West Bank to train other militants and would-be suicide bombers on the assembly of explosives. Sabih was able to travel to the West Bank by claiming to be meeting her future fiancé. In the West Bank city of Tulkarm, Sabih supported the Hamas cell allegedly responsible for the kidnapping and murder of Sasson Nuriel.

On 29 September 2005, Israeli security officials arrested Sabih at her home in Tulkarm. Her arrest was announced on 10 October as part of the mass arrest of 117 Hamas activists. Israeli security officials claimed that Sabih confessed to her activities. She was sentenced to 28 months in prison on charges of conducting military training and belonging to Hamas, along with her husband. Sabih and her son were released from prison on 17 December 2007 after completing her sentence. She was met by her husband, who had been deported to Gaza, at the Erez Crossing.

== Personal life ==
Sabih is married to Razmi Subih. In 2006, Sabih gave birth to her son Baraa at an Israeli military hospital in Kfar Saba. At the time, Razmi was imprisoned at Negev Prison.

== See also ==
- Reem Riyashi
- Women in Palestine
