= Bahad 16 =

Israel Defense Forces search and rescue training base

Unit wings

Bahad 16 (Hebrew: בה"ד 16; lit: Training base 16) is a training base (bahad) belonging to the Israel Defense Forces (IDF) under the command of the Home Front Command domestic Search and Rescue (SAR) unit. Because it is the only SAR training base, Bahad 16 is synonymous with the SAR unit itself. Since 2021 it is located at the Rehavam Camp, Ramla, which is also the headquarters of the Home Front Command. Previously it was located within the disestablished Tzrifin base.

This unit should not be confused with Unit 669. Bahad 16 is a domestic search and rescue unit, primarily operating in times of natural disasters, while Unit 669 is the Israeli Air Force's Tactical Combat Search and Rescue (CSAR) unit that operates behind enemy lines.

== History ==
IDF Home Front Command Search and Rescue unit was a re-organization of HaGaHa, the Israeli civil defense force. It was created in February 1992 following the Gulf War, which, as the most threatening war to Israel's homeland since the 1948 Arab-Israeli War, led to a perceived need for more security beyond the border.

== Purpose ==
The SAR unit serves as a ready unit for natural disasters (such as earthquakes and floods), for civil disasters (such as the Versailles wedding hall disaster), and for response to deliberate military or para-military attacks (such as with Katyusha, Grad or Scud rockets or with IEDs).

The Rescue Brigade has three main roles:

1. Training soldiers and civilians, both within and outside of the Home Front Command, in the fields of rescue, NBC (nuclear, biological, and chemical) warfare, and civil defense.
2. Training Home Front Command units for their missions (including reserve units and regular combat battalions).
3. Training Home Front Command headquarters.

The brigade trains soldiers in all rear defense professions, including rescue and evacuation, NBC, and population management. The reserve battalions of the Home Front Command undergo training and exercises there. Additionally, the brigade is prepared to assist in rescue operations both domestically and internationally when needed. With the relocation of most of the training bases from Tzrifin to the Negev as part of the City of Training Bases project, the training base has moved to Camp Rehavam, where the Home Front Command headquarters is currently located.

During Operation Defensive Shield in 2002, four-man teams from the unit were attached to infantry units in Jenin and Ramallah. There, teams facilitated troop movement by breaking openings in walls between houses (known as mouse-holing/Rhizome Manoeuvre).

== Operations ==
Since its formation, the unit has operated both in Israel and abroad, including in Greece, Turkey, Haiti, Brazil and Buenos Aires.

- Nepal (2015)

Following deadly earthquakes, Israel operated the largest humanitarian presence in Nepal, with over 250 doctors and rescue personnel.

- Port-au-Prince, Haiti (2010)

Following a 7.0 magnitude earthquake two teams were sent from the unit as part of a large Israeli delegation.

- Beit Yehoshua, Israel (2006)

Train Wreck

- Tel Aviv, Israel (2006)

Collapsed building due to a gas explosion

- Nairobi, Kenya (2006)

Following the collapse of a five-story building in Nairobi, Kenya, on January 23, 2006, Bahad 16 & Yachtza forces arrived 23 hours after the disaster. At that stage, two people were still buried under the building and special techniques (tunneling and scalping) were required to secure their evacuation. The two people were evacuated and both recovered after a short stay in hospital.

- Jaffa, Israel (2005)

A crane collapsed on a building

- Revidim, Israel (2005)

Train Wreck

- Jerusalem (2001)

Following the collapse of the Versailles wedding hall, Bahad 16 & Yachtza forces arrived within an hour of the disaster. During the rescue operation 23 bodies were excavated and 3 people were removed alive.

- Gölcük, Turkey (1999)

After the İzmit earthquake, Israeli forces were sent to assist with rescue efforts at the Gölcük Naval base.
