= Bahad 4 =

Training base of Israel Defense Forces

Coordinates: 31°36′13.5″N 34°30′27.7″E

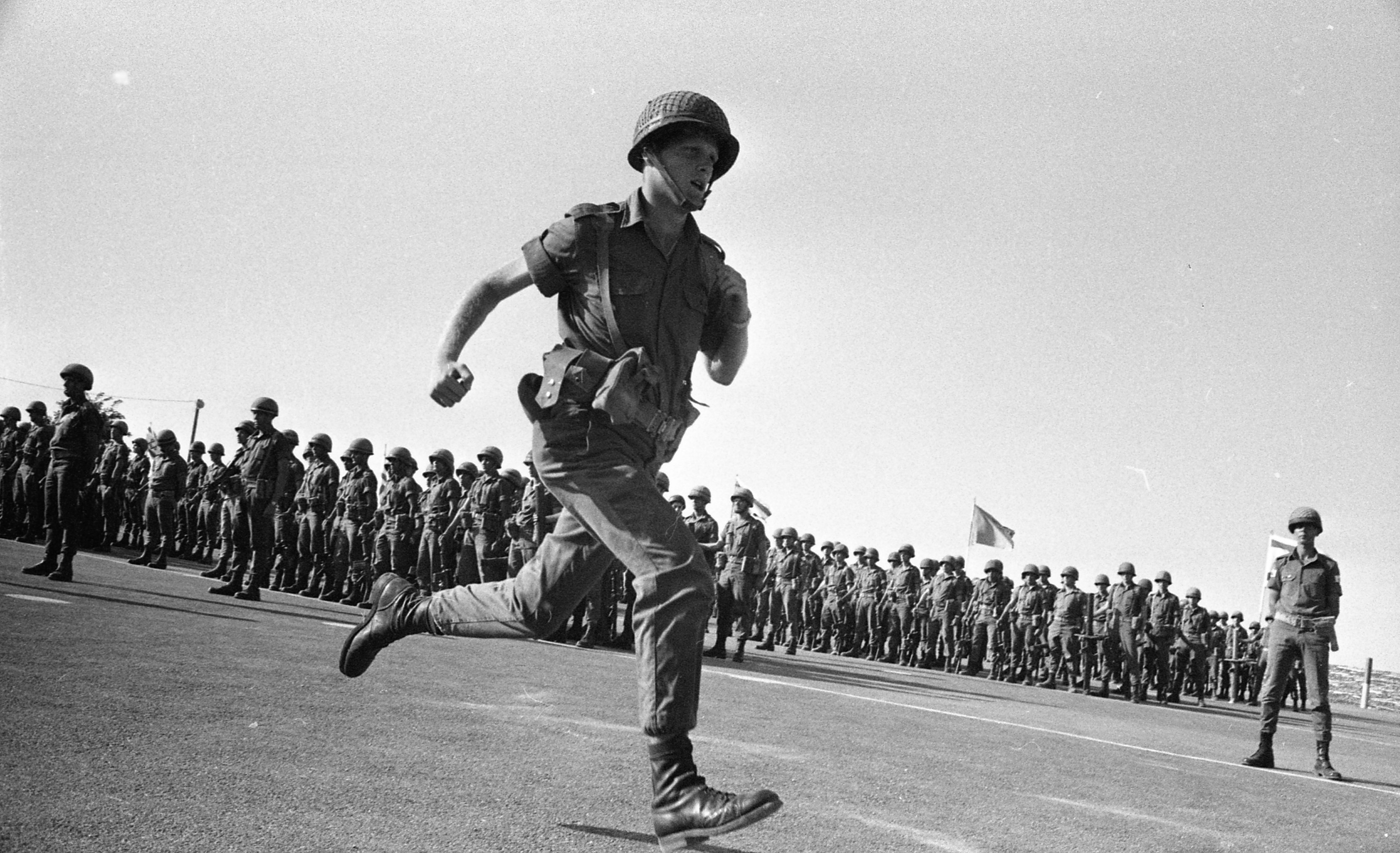
End of IDF basic training exercise in Bahad 4, 1969

Bahad 4 (Hebrew: בה"ד 4), commonly known as Batar Zikim (בט"ר זיקים, lit. Zikim Training Base) is a training base (Bahad) belonging to the Israel Defense Forces (IDF).

Zikim is located 8 km south of Ashkelon. It was named after the nearby kibbutz Zikim.

The majority of new recruits in Zikim pass the Rifleman 02 recruit training (tironut) which has all but replaced the older 00 level that was usually reserved for non-combat female recruits.

== History ==
Bahad 4 was founded in 1949 as the main IDF recruit training base, for all types of recruits (combat and non-combat). It was originally located in Tzrifin, but after the Six-Day War it was moved to the Beit El base in the newly captured West Bank. After the Interim Agreement on the West Bank and the Gaza Strip signed in 1995, the base was moved to Zikim.

=== Conflict with Hamas-run Gaza since 2007 ===
Bahad 4 is one of the few Israeli military bases under threat of short-range Qassam rockets fired from the Gaza Strip, and has endured numerous barrages. On September 11, 2007, a Qassam rocket hit an empty tent, causing injuries to soldiers in neighboring tents. Four soldiers were seriously wounded and a further 63 were treated for moderate to light wounds and shock. One soldier, Avi Dorfman, was critically brain-injured, and his miraculous recovery was chronicled in the Israeli news. Following the incident, pressure was put on the IDF by parents to stop training recruits at the base.

On November 19, 2008, Zikim was evacuated as part of a plan presented by Deputy Chief of Staff Dan Harel to remove general recruit training bases. Following Operation Cast Lead, Qassam attacks temporarily decreased, and returning recruits to Zikim became a viable option. In late 2009, after a severe shortage of space in the other basic training bases, several companies were placed at Zikim, and more were expected to be recreated in 2009–2010.

On 7 October 2023, at the start of the Gaza war, the base was attacked by Hamas fighters in the Zikim attack. Six officers and one recruit were killed in the fighting before the militants withdrew.

== Structure and board ==
The base comprises nine companies for any kinds of troops. There is a special company for commander training (קורס מפקדים) and officers' course. Female commanders are dominant on the base.

Each company is represented by a letter in the Hebrew alphabet (from alef (1) to yud (10), while skipping zayin (7)), as well as a word starting with the corresponding letter. Each company also has an official motto. The company names are as follows:

- 1. Alef (א) - Eitan
- 2. Bet (ב) - Bardelas (Cheetah)
- 3. Gimel (ג) - Golan
- 4. Daled (ד) - Dores (Predator)
- 5. Hey (ה) - Harel
- 6. Vav (ו) - Vulcan
- 7. Het (ח) - Horev
- 8. Tet (ט) - Tornado
- 9. Yud (י) - Yuval
