= Zikim =

Kibbutz in southern Israel

Zikim: זִיקִים (Hebrew); زيكيم (Arabic)
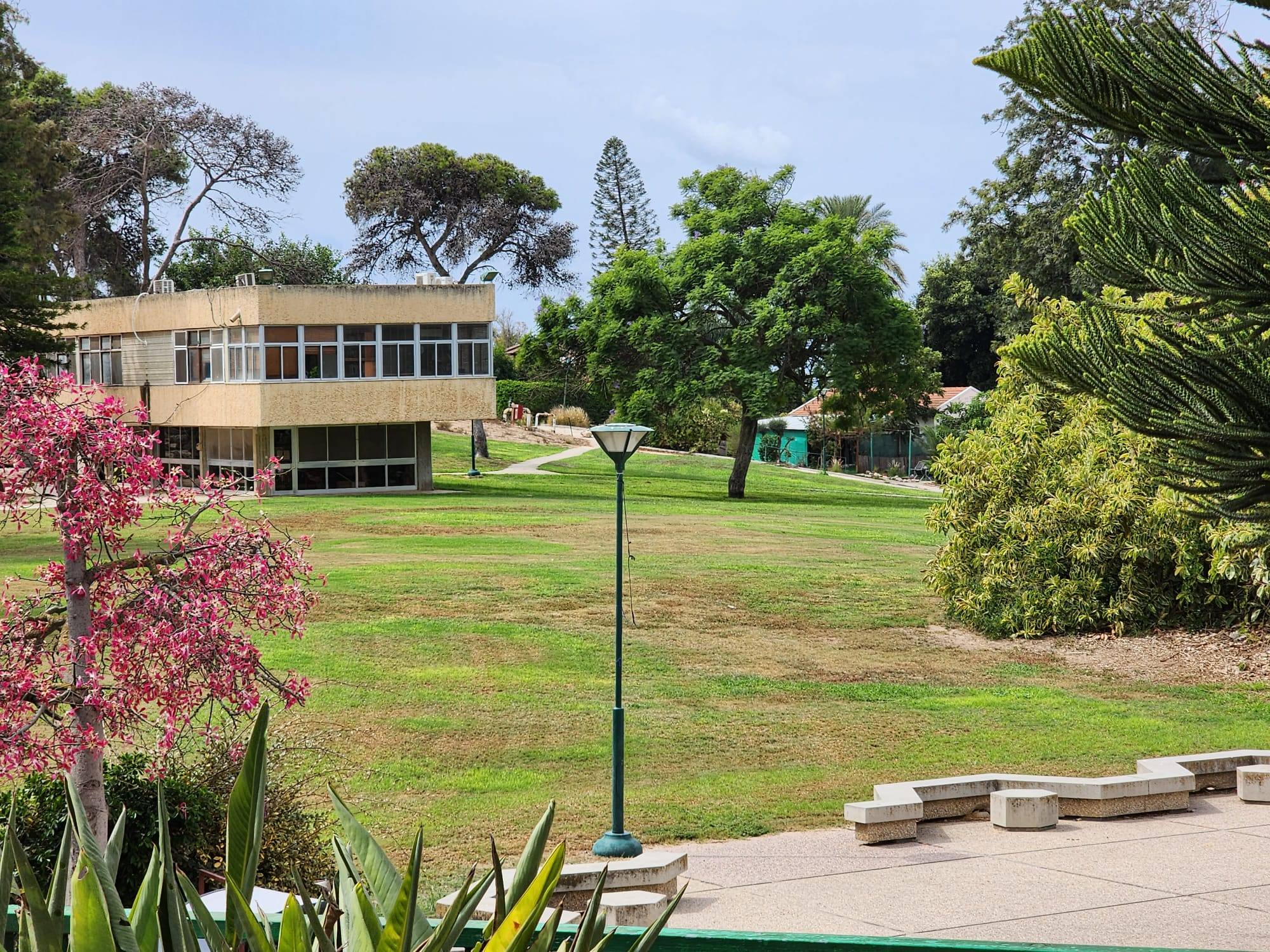
- Kibbutz Zikim in 2023

- Location within Ashkelon region of Israel Location within Israel
- Coordinates: 31°36′28″N 34°31′18″E
- Country: Israel
- District: Southern
- Subdistrict: Ashkelon
- Council: Hof Ashkelon
- Affiliation: Kibbutz Movement
- Founded: 1949
- Founder: Romanian Hashomer Hatzair Members
- Population (2024): 997
- Website: www.zikim.org.il

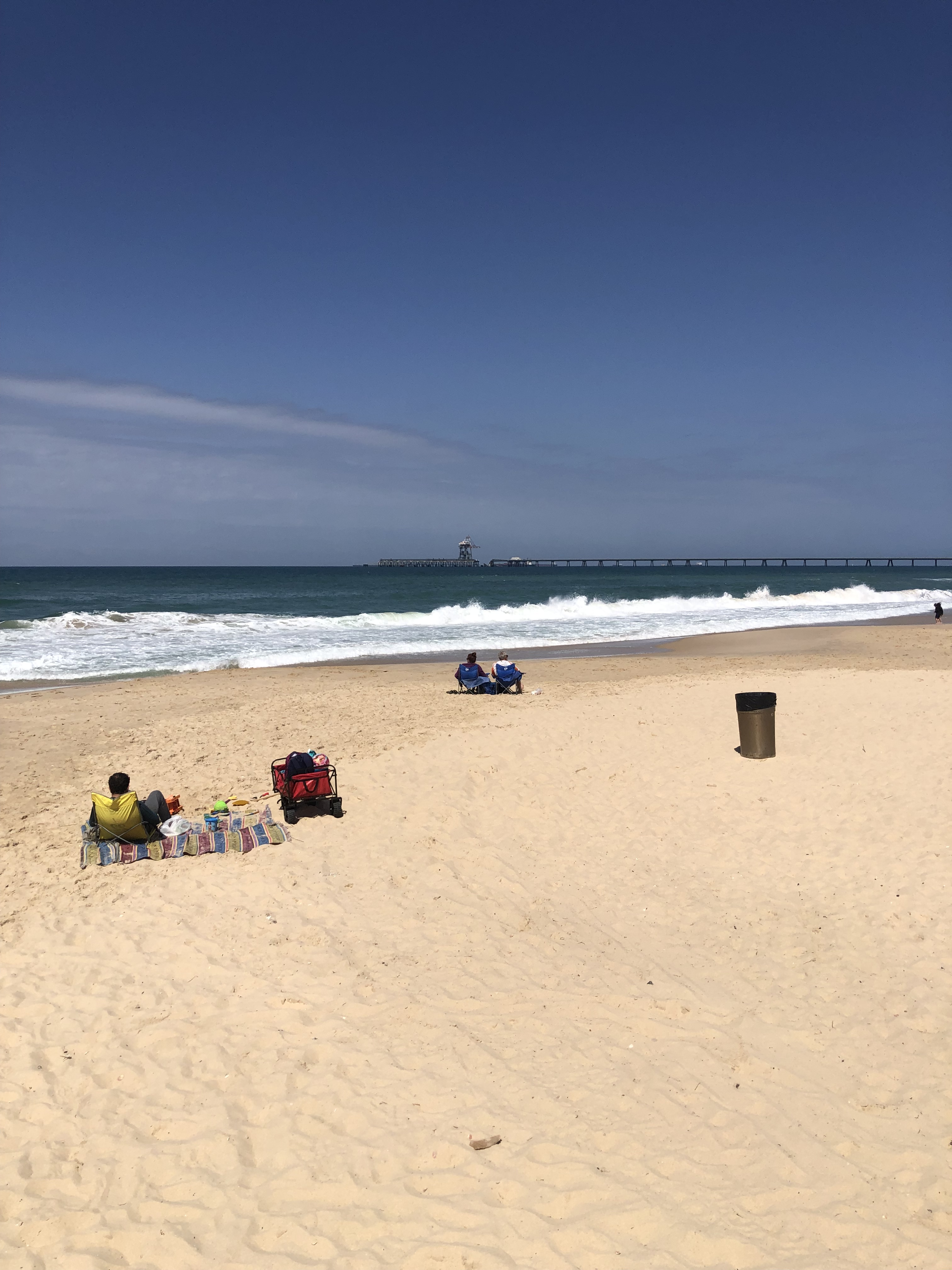
Zikim beach

Kibbutz Zikim in 1956

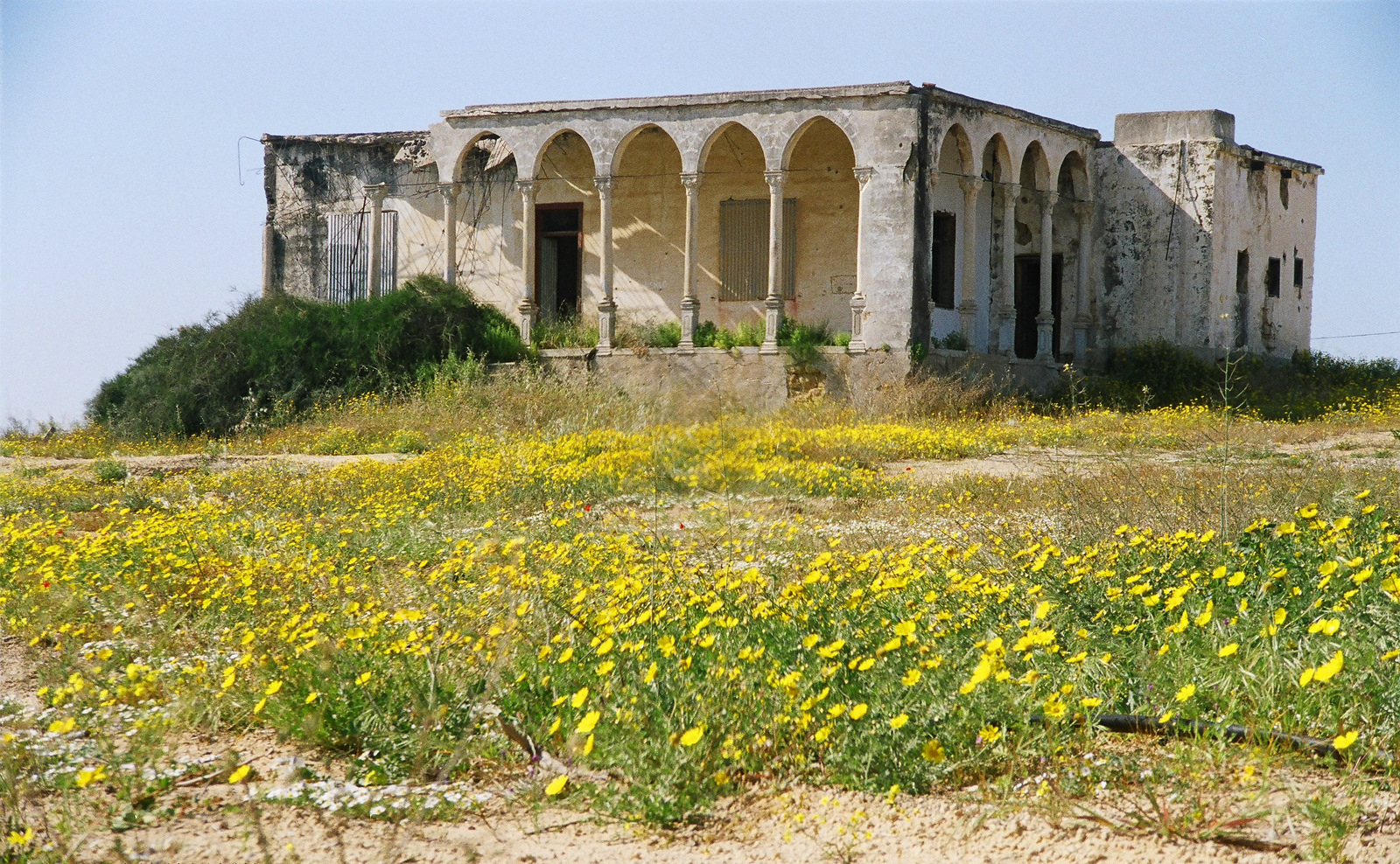
Old Arab house on the hill above the kibbutz

Zikim (Hebrew: זִיקִים, lit. 'sparks') is a kibbutz in southern Israel. Located in the northern Negev desert, it falls under the jurisdiction of Hof Ashkelon Regional Council. In 2024, it had a population of 997.

== Etymology ==
"Zikim" means "sparks" in Hebrew. Michael Harsgor, later an Israeli historian, came up with this name based on a quote from response of Alexander Odoevsky to Pushkin's poem that he translated into Hebrew: "From sparks shall come a flame." While imprisoned during the Second World War in Romania, an ally of Nazi Germany, for his activity in Hashomer Hatzair, Harsgor envisioned Zikim as the name of a future kibbutz he hoped to join.

== History ==
=== Background ===
For settlement history preceding the kibbutz, see Hiribya: History. The Late Neolithic Ziqim archaeological site is associated with the Nizzanim culture. Ancient discoveries in Zikim comprise a Greek graffito on the base of a high-quality plate dating from 144-160 BCE, and Greek inscriptions on Gazan jars from the 6th to early 7th century CE. Hiribya was known in the medieval Crusader period as La Forbie, site of the 1244 Battle of Forbie.

=== Kibbutz ===
The kibbutz was established in 1949, on the land of the depopulated Palestinian village of Hiribya. The founders were a group of young Jews from Romania, who belonged to Hashomer Hatzair before their arrival in Mandatory Palestine in 1947 - at a time when Romania was on the verge of becoming a Communist Bloc country. At that time, Jewish settlement in the Negev was very sparse, and each new location was considered to be a "point of light" (zik) in the wilderness.

Zikim attracted members of Hashomer Hatzair from around the world, most recently from South America. British actor Bob Hoskins, although not Jewish, worked as a volunteer in Zikim in 1967.

During the 1970s, the Shiqma Reservoir was established near the kibbutz. In the process, most of the Late Neolithic Ziqim site near the shore was bulldozed.

In 2006, Palestinian Islamic Jihad fired a Qassam rocket from northern Gaza that hit a mattress factory in Zikim. In July 2014, five armed Palestinians attempted to cross into Israel via the beach at Kibbutz Zikim. They were killed by IDF gunfire.

On 7 October 2023, as part of an attack on Israel, Hamas terrorists amphibiously assaulted the Zikim training base and Zikim kibbutz. Hamas killed 19 civilians, 8 soldiers and left dozens wounded on the beach. The remaining Hamas terrorists from the beach were killed while attempting to enter the kibbutz. An emergency security team made up of civilians there had been alerted to the infiltration by the navy, and preemptively positioned themselves along a fence surrounding the kibbutz. A squad of six Hamas terrorists arrived at the kibbutz driving the Israeli military vehicle that had been abandoned on the beach. A firefight quickly ensued, and the terrorists dispersed, eventually being tracked down and killed after about an hour of combat. The security team remained at their positions until 2:30 the next morning, assisting in the evacuation of civilians and awaiting IDF reinforcements that never arrived.

== Economy ==
The main crops are mango and avocado. Zikim also operates one of Israel's largest dairy farms. The main industrial product is polyurethane, produced by the kibbutz factory, Polyrit.

== Notable people ==
- Peretz Kidron (1933–2011), Israeli writer, journalist and translator
- Hagai Zamir (born 1951), Israeli paralympic volleyball champion
