= Nukhba forces =

Special forces unit of Hamas

- قوات النخبة
- Other name: Al-Nukhba
- Leaders: Ali Al Qadi † (Note: On October 14, 2023, the Israel Defense Forces announced that Ali Al Qadi was killed in a drone attack.); Ayman Nofal † (Note: Killed by an airstrike on an apartment complex on October 17, 2023.); Bilal al Qadr †
- Dates active: 2010–present
- Country: Palestine
- Allegiance: Hamas
- Headquarters: Gaza Strip
- Active regions: Palestine; Israel
- Ideology: Sunni Islamism; Palestinian nationalism Palestinian self-determination Anti-Zionism
- Part of: (Hamas) Al-Qassam Brigades
- Wars: Gaza–Israel conflict; Gaza War (2008–2009); 2014 Gaza War; Gaza war; Operation Al-Aqsa flood

The Nukhba forces (Arabic: قوات النخبة, romanized: Quwwāt an-Nukhba), lit. 'the elite') are a special forces naval commando unit within the Al-Qassam Brigades, Hamas' military branch. The unit was formed around 2010 and is equipped to carry out coastal raids, tunnel infiltrations, and underwater operations.

The IDF claim that the October 7 attacks on southern Israel, which set off the Gaza war, were primarily led by the Nukhba forces. International observers observe that the term "Nukhba" has also been widely used by Israeli officials to refer to any active Hamas militant or captured combatant, despite Israeli intelligence designating the entire unit as a terrorist entity actively targeted by a specialized Shin Bet division named "Nili."

== Training ==
Nukhba members begin their land and sea-based training when they are 18 to 20 years old.

== History ==
Al-Qassam Brigades established a special forces unit after the 2008–2009 Gaza War.

Nukhba members participated in the 2014 and 2021 conflicts with Israel, including the 2014 Zikim attack.

In 2017, some members defected to join ISIS in the Sinai Peninsula.

In 2020, Saudi news media reported that one of the Nukhba force's top officers had defected to Israel.

== Gaza war ==
=== October 7 attacks ===
On October 7, Hamas forces invaded Israel. On October 12, 2023, the Jerusalem Post reported that Shin Bet had set up a new unit called Nili – an abbreviation of the Hebrew phrase Netzach Yisrael Lo Yeshaker (transl. The Eternity of Israel Will Not Lie) – tasked with hunting down Nukhba members. They reported, "This force was specifically set up to target members of a special commando unit within Hamas's military wing called Nukhba ("elite")". In October 2023, an IDF spokesman said that the Israeli air force have been specifically targeting Nukhba members: "We plan to get every one of those people". According to the IDF, Ayman Nofal had responsibility for the Nukhba at the Be'eri massacre and Re'im music festival massacre. On October 17 Nofal was killed in an airstrike that destroyed four apartment buildings, killing at least 70 other people.

=== Israeli Invasion and occupation of the Gaza Strip ===
On 31 October 2023, Israel said that in its airstrike in the Jabalia refugee camp, it killed a top Hamas militant that directed Nukhba teams that attacked Israel on October 7. It added that his tunnel collapsed, causing adjacent buildings to collapse as well.

On 1 January 2024, the IDF said that it killed company commander Adil Mismah of the Nukhba Force in an airstrike in Deir al-Balah.

On 22 November 2024, the IDF and Shin Bet claimed to have killed five Hamas militants including Jihad Mahmoud Yahya Kahlout, a Nukhba forces company commander, and Muhammad Riad Ali Oukal, a Hamas company commander who participated in the 7 October attack in an air strike in Beit Lahia one day prior. Hamas said that Israeli attacks in Beit Lahia killed a total of 112 people, including 64 children and women.

On 11 December 2024, the IDF said that it killed Fehmi Salmi, a commander of Nukhba forces of Hamas in a separate airstrike, saying that he was responsible for an attack on an IDF outpost on the border with Gaza which killed 14 Israeli soldiers during 7 October attack and led numerous attacks on soldiers operating in Gaza during the war.

On 9 January 2025, the IDF said that it killed Osama Abu Namus, commander of Sabra Battalion of Hamas, which is part of its Gaza City Brigade who was Hamas's significant source of knowledge and was responsible for attacks targeting Israel and Israeli soldiers in Gaza, particularly soldiers operating in the Netzarim Corridor and Mohammed al-Tarq, the deputy commander of the battalion who previously served as the commander in a Nukhba force company in the battalion and was also responsible for attacks against soldiers in Netzarim Corridor, along with other militants in separate strikes. It also said that it killed two commanders in a Nukbha force company in the Sabra Battalion in recent air strikes, one of whom was responsible for supplying weapons.

On 16 January 2025, the IDF said that it killed Hamas Nukhba force militant Muhammad Hashem Zahdi Abu al-Rous who took part in the Nova music festival massacre during the 7 October attacks in an airstrike in Gaza in the previous day.

On 30 January, the IDF said that it killed Haytham Hazem Hijazi Rajab, a Hamas Nukhba force member in Shuja'iyya Battalion who participated in the Nahal Oz attack during the 7 October attacks and was involved in several additional attacks on soldiers in Gaza.

On 4 April, the IDF said that it killed a Hamas Nukhba force company's deputy commander in a recent drone strike in north Gaza.

On 15 April, the IDF and Shin Bet announced that they killed the commander of a cell in the Nukhba force's Deir al-Balah Battalion who participated in the 7 October attacks in a strike in central Gaza two weeks prior.

On 29 April, the IDF and Shin Bet said that they killed a Hamas militant from the Nukhba forces in the Deir el-Balah Brigade who commanded the infiltration of Kissufim during the 7 October attacks and another Hamas militant who was the chief of operations in its Jabalia Brigade and directed attacks targeting Israeli forces in Gaza.

On 21 May, the IDF said that the IAF struck more than 115 targets in Gaza in the last day including a drone strike in north Gaza which killed a Nukhba Force militant in its East Jabalia Battalion who participated in the 7 October attacks, rocket launchers, buildings used by militant groups, tunnels, other infrastructure, and militant cells. It added that the Israeli Navy also conducted shelling in north Gaza to assist ground forces operating in the area.

On 26 May, the IDF said the IAF conducted more than 200 strikes in Gaza in last 48 hours. It also said that targets included militants, weapon depots, anti-tank and sniper positions, tunnel shafts, and other infrastructure. It added that its soldiers struck a building used by Hamas as a weapons depot, an observation post, and another structure used by the group, directed drone strikes on several militants spotted in buildings in the vicinity of its forces in south Gaza and launched an airstrike strike on a building where the Nukhba Force was operating in north Gaza.

On 8 July, the IDF announced that it killed a Nukhba forces commander who participated in the 7 October attacks.

On 13 August, the IDF announced that it killed the Nukhba Force's deputy commander in the central Jabalya battalion following a joint operation by the IDF and Shin Bet. It also said that the militant participated in the 7 October attacks and the abduction of three Israeli soldiers.

On 20 August, the IDF announced that in the prior week in Khan Yunis it killed a Nukhba forces militant who participated in the 7 October attacks.

On 2 September, the IDF said that it killed dozens of Hamas militants in north and central Gaza, including the Zaytoun Battalion's deputy company commander since 2024 as well as a Nukhba forces commander who participated in the 7 October attacks and destroyed militant structures in Shuja'iyya and Zaytun.

On 9 September, the IDF said that a militant that commanded a Hamas Nukhba group in Beit Hanoun, and took part in the 7 October attacks, and took parts in raids that killed and injured IDF soldiers, was killed by the IDF, while he was planning and about to execute additional attacks against IDF.

On 29 October, the Israeli Air Force said that it targeted a number of senior Hamas militants, including 21 commanders out of which one was a Nukhba Force commander.

On 6 March 2026, the IDF said that its Golani Brigade in the past week killed eight Nukhba Force militants whom it accused of violating the truce.

On 29 August 2026, the IDF confirmed to have asassinated commander Hani Abd al-Hai Fakhri Mazloum.

== Confessions from captured militants ==
According to Israel's security service Shin Bet, captured Nukhba members were ordered to kill everyone they saw. If they brought hostages back to Gaza they would be richly rewarded.

According to footage the Israeli security services released of interrogation of purportedly captured Nukhba members, Hamas has been using medical facilities in the Gaza Strip, especially the Shifa Hospital in Gaza City, to shield themselves from Israeli strikes and that the underground levels of the hospital are utilized for hiding resources like weapons and ammunition. Hamas denied these claims.

In response to a question from Arab Israeli KM Ahmad Tibi criticizing the treatment of Palestinian prisoners who were tortured and sexually assaulted by Israeli soldiers, Knesset member Hanoch Milwidsky from the Likud party said: "If he is a Nukhba, everything is legitimate to do! Everything!" Knesset member Simcha Rothman also commented on the Nukhba, stating that "we see over and over again an enormous disconnect between the justice and enforcement agencies, who persecute reservists, heroic fighters, who left everything behind in order to protect us from the Nukhba terrorists, for whom 'animals' is a compliment".

== See also ==
- Arrow Unit, Gaza police's special forces unit
- Redwan Force, Hezbollah's special forces unit
- Shayetet 13, Israeli Navy's special forces unit
- Syria's Tomorrow Movement § Military wing (Syrian Elite Forces)
