= Tegart =

Tegart is a surname. Notable people with the surname include:

- SIr Charles Tegart (1881–1946), colonial police officer in India and Mandatory Palestine
  - Tegart fort, style of militarized police fort constructed throughout Palestine during the British Mandatory period
  - Tegart's wall, barbed wire fence erected in 1938 by British Mandatory authorities on the northern border of Palestine
- Greg Tegart (born 1929), Australian academic, scientist and former senior public servant
- Jackie Tegart (born 1955/6), Canadian politician
- Judy Tegart (born 1937), Australian professional tennis player
