= MacTaggart =

- Language: Gaelic

Origin
- Meaning: "son of the priest"
- Region of origin: Scotland, Ulster

Other names
- Variant forms: Taggart, McTaggart
- Frequency Comparisons (McTaggart)

MacTaggart is a surname of Scottish or Ultonian origin. It is an Anglicisation of the Scottish Gaelic Mac an t-Sagairt, meaning "son of the priest" Also having the forms McTaggart and Taggart.

== People with the surname MacTaggart ==
- Fearchar mac an t-sagairt (anglicised as Farquhar MacTaggart) 13th century Earl of Ross
- Fiona Mactaggart
- Gerry MacTaggart
- Ivan Mactaggart
- James MacTaggart
- John Mactaggart (disambiguation)
- Sandy Mactaggart
- William MacTaggart

== Other ==
- Mactaggart baronets
- MacTaggart-Stewart baronets
  - Mark MacTaggart-Stewart
- Mactaggart, Edmonton, Alberta, Canada
- Mactaggarts Woolstore, Brisbane, Australia

== See also ==
- Moira MacTaggert, comic book character
- McTaggart
- Taggart (surname)
