= Taggart (disambiguation) =

Taggart is a Scottish detective television drama first shown in 1983.

Taggart may also refer to:

== People ==
- Taggart (surname), definition of the surname and list of people with the surname
- Taggart "Tagg" Romney (b. 1970), an American businessman, son of Mitt Romney

== Fictional characters ==
- John Taggart, Sheriff character in the movie Cowboys & Aliens
- Taggart, character in the American movie Blazing Saddles
- Billy Taggart, character in the movie Broken City
- Dagny Taggart, a character in Ayn Rand's Atlas Shrugged
- Flynn Taggart, main protagonist of the Doom series of novels
- James Taggart (Atlas Shrugged), a character in Atlas Shrugged
- James "Paladin" Taggart, character in the Wing Commander computer games
- Ian Taggart, an antagonist in the video game Prototype
- Jim Taggart, a character in the TV series Taggart
- Jim Taggart (Eureka), character in American science fiction drama Eureka
- Samantha Taggart, character in the American drama ER
- Sergeant Taggart, character in the American movies Beverly Hills Cop and Beverly Hills Cop II
- William "Bill" Taggart, character in Deus Ex: Human Revolution video game
- Richard "Rip" Taggart, character in A&E History channel series Six

== Places and structures ==
- Taggart, Virginia, United States
- Taggart, Ontario, in Kenora District, Ontario, Canada
- Taggart Hall, a historic site in Romney, West Virginia, USA

== Other uses ==
- Taggart (film), a 1964 film directed by R. G. Springsteen

== See also ==
- Tegart fort, any of several police fortresses built throughout Palestine by Sir Charles Tegart, often referred to by Israeli sources as "Taggart"
- Tegart's wall, barbed wire fence erected on the northern border of Palestine in the time of the British Mandate
