= McTaggart =

McTaggart is a surname of Scottish or Ultonian origin. It is an Anglicisation of the Gaelic Mac an t-Sagairt, meaning "son of the priest". Also having the forms MacTaggart and Taggart. It is common in the English-speaking nations, and may refer to:

== McTaggart ==
- Alex McTaggart, Australian politician
- Bert McTaggart, Australian rules footballer
- Bob McTaggart, Scottish politician
- David McTaggart, Canadian environmentalist
- Dick McTaggart, Scottish amateur boxer and Olympic champion
- Ed McTaggart, American drummer, photographer, and artist
- Ian McTaggart-Cowan, Canadian ecologist
- J. M. E. McTaggart, British idealist philosopher
- John McTaggart (disambiguation)
- Sir John McTaggart, 1st Baronet, Scottish politician
- Lynne McTaggart, journalist and author, promoter of alternative medicine
- Patrick McTaggart-Cowan, Canadian meteorologist
- Olivia McTaggart (born 2000), pole vault athlete from New Zealand
- William McTaggart, Scottish landscape painter

== See also ==
- Taggart (disambiguation)
- MacTaggart
