= Mordechai Gur =

10th Chief of Staff of Israel Defense Forces

- מרדכי גור
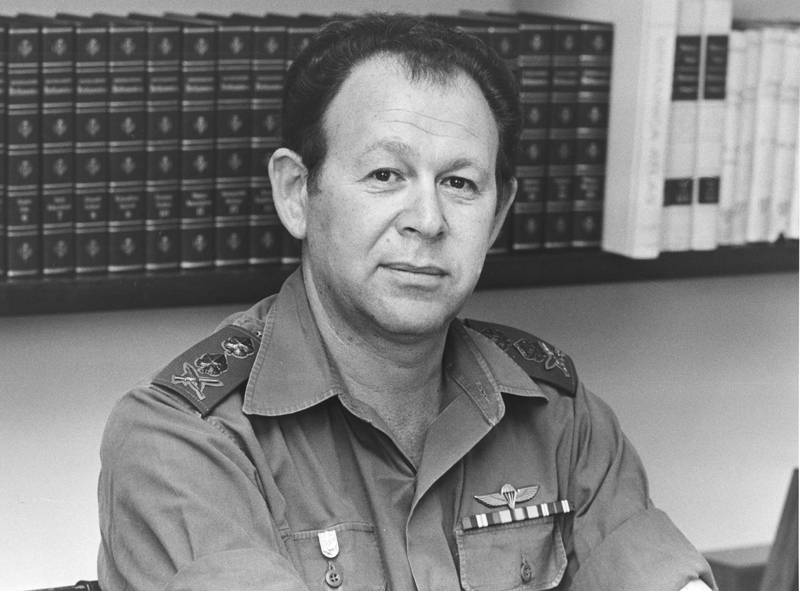

Ministerial roles
- 1984–1986: Minister of Health
- 1988–1990: Minister without Portfolio

Faction represented in the Knesset
- 1981–1991: Alignment
- 1991–1995: Labor Party

Personal details
- Born: 6 May 1930 Jerusalem, Mandatory Palestine
- Died: 16 July 1995 (aged 65) Tel Aviv, Israel
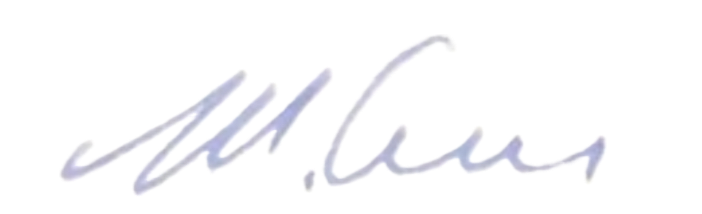
- Signature
- Nickname: Motta

Military service
- Allegiance: Israel
- Branch/service: Haganah; Israel Defense Forces
- Years of service: 1946–1978
- Rank: Rav aluf (Lieutenant general)
- Battles/wars: 1948 Arab-Israeli War; Suez Crisis; Six-Day War; Yom Kippur War

Mordechai "Motta" Gur (Hebrew: מרדכי "מוטה" גור; May 6, 1930 – July 16, 1995) was an Israeli politician and the 10th Chief of Staff of the Israel Defense Forces. During the Six-Day War (1967), he commanded the brigade that penetrated the Old City of Jerusalem and broadcast the famous words, "The Temple Mount is in our hands!" (Hebrew: הר הבית בידינו, Har HaBayit B'Yadeinu). As Chief of Staff, he had responsibility for planning and executing Operation Entebbe (1976) to free Jewish hostages in Uganda. He later entered the Knesset and held various ministerial portfolios. Gur wrote three popular children's books and three books about military history.

== Military career ==
Gur was born in Jerusalem as Mordechai Gorban to Moshe and Tovah Gorban. His father's family were from Ukraine, and his mother's were from Poland. At age 13, he joined the Palmach Haganah (the underground armed group of the Jews in the British Mandate of Palestine). Among his duties in the Haganah were overseeing the Gadna pre-military preparatory program for adolescents.

He continued serving in a military capacity with the founding of the Israel Defense Forces (IDF) during the 1948 Arab-Israeli War.

In the IDF, Gur served in the Paratroopers Brigade most of his career and became one of the symbols of the "red beret" brigade. During the 1950s he was a company commander under the command of Ariel Sharon. He was wounded during a counter-terror raid in Khan Yunis in 1955 (Operation Elkayam) and received a recommendation of honor from Chief of Staff Moshe Dayan. In 1957 he was appointed as adjutant to the brigade commander. After serving in this position Gur went to study at the École Supérieure de Guerre in Paris.

After two years in France, he returned and was appointed as the commander of the Golani Brigade (1961–1963) and commanded the counter-terror raid in Nukiev. He brought over the traditions and attitude of the Paratroopers, raised morale, and helped instill an espirit de corps in Golani for which the brigade is still famous. In 1965 he was appointed as the head of the operations branch in the general staff of the IDF. During 1965-1967 served as a commander of the IDF Command and Staff College.

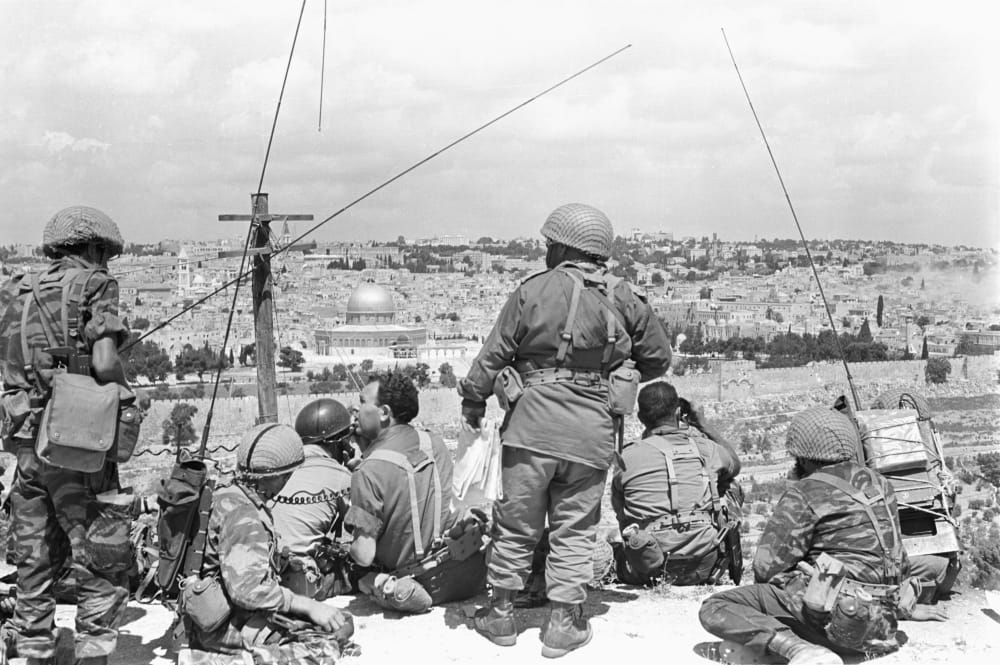
Mota Gur (on telephone, without helmet) with the Paratroopers on the Mount of Olives before entering the Old City of Jerusalem.

In 1966 Gur was appointed as the commander of the 55th Paratroopers Brigade (Reserve), which he led during the Six-Day War. Gur and his troops were part of the assault force which wrested Jerusalem from the Jordanians, and which were the first to visit the Western Wall and the Temple Mount. The pictures of paratroopers crying at the Wall and Gur's audio recording in the communication networks, "The Temple Mount is in our hands!" (Hebrew: !הר הבית בידינו, Har HaBayit BeYadeinu!), became one of the most touching symbols of the war both to the Israeli public and those abroad.

After the war he was promoted to brigadier general's rank and was appointed as the IDF commander in the Gaza Strip and northern Sinai Peninsula. In 1969 he was promoted to major general and was appointed as the commander of the northern front, where Palestinian militants from the PLO, backed by Syria, attacked Israel's northern settlements. Gur led several counter-attacks to reign in the terror attacks, conquering the Shebaa farms from Syria in order to establish a defensive position to prevent border attacks.

From August 1972 to December 1973 he served as the IDF military attache at Israel's Washington D.C., embassy. In January 1974 he was reappointed as the commander of the northern front.

Following the retirement of General David Elazar due to the criticism of the Agranat Commission he was appointed in April 1974 as the 10th IDF Chief of Staff. In 1976, he was responsible for planning and carrying out Israel's rescue of 102 hostages from Entebbe Airport in Uganda. In 1977, Gur warned shortly before Egyptian President Anwar el-Sadat's visit to Jerusalem that the trip might be a ruse to hide Egyptian plans for a war. He put the army on alert and was nearly fired for his lapse in judgment. In 1978, Gur guided a campaign in Lebanon to drive out Palestinian guerrillas. He served as chief of staff until 1978.

== Civilian and political career ==
Following his retirement from the IDF, Gur was appointed as the general manager of Kur Mechanica company. In 1981 he was elected to the Knesset as a member of the Israeli Labor Party within the Alignment. Re-elected in 1984, he served as Minister of Health and was also a member of the Knesset's Security and Foreign Affairs Committee. Between 1986 and 1988 he served on the board of Solel Boneh, a construction company. In April 1988 he was appointed Minister without Portfolio, a position he retained following the 1988 elections until March 1990, when Labor pulled out of the coalition.

After the Labor Party won the 1992 elections, Prime Minister Yitzhak Rabin appointed Gur to be Deputy Minister of Defense. In that role, Gur was responsible for preparing the Israeli economy for times of war and crisis and interacting with the Jewish settlers in the West Bank and in the Gaza Strip. Gur hoped to one day be prime minister, but cancer halted his political aspirations.

== Death ==
In 1995, Gur became seriously ill with terminal cancer. He died by suicide with a handgun on July 16, 1995 at the age of 65. Gur left a note saying he did not want to be a burden to his family. Israeli Prime Minister Yitzhak Rabin mourned him as "a special person, sensitive and strong, a soldier and a civilian, a lover of books and of writing, and above all, a friend." Gur was buried with full military honors in Tel Aviv.

== Legacy ==
Area 21, a military base in the Sharon plain, was renamed in his honour (Camp Motta Gur).

A Metronit station in Kiryat Ata is named after Gur.

In Modiin a street and a school was named after Gur.

Gur helped create the "Follow me" slogan of commanders in the Israel Defense Forces.

Gur was played by Jack Warden in the film Raid on Entebbe (1977), Stefan Gierasch in Victory at Entebbe (1976), and Mark Ivanir in 7 Days in Entebbe (2018).

== Bibliography ==
- Har HaBayit BeYadeinu (literally "The Temple Mount is in our hands") (The Battle for Jerusalem), 1974.

== See also ==
- List of Israel's Chiefs of the General Staff
