= Tegart fort =

Militarized police forts constructed by British authorities in Mandatory Palestine

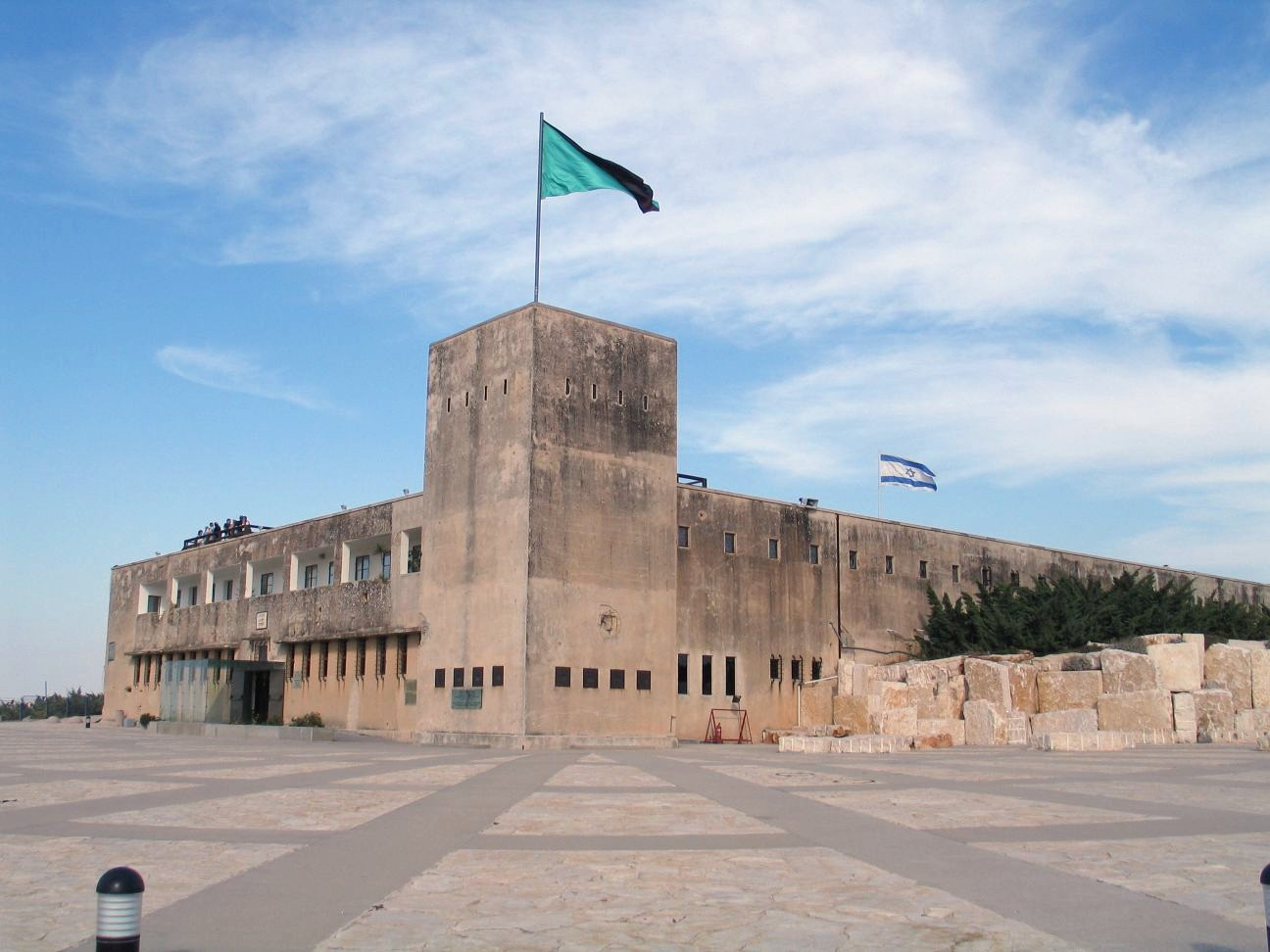
The Tegart police fort at Latrun

A Tegart fort is a type of militarized police fort constructed throughout Mandatory Palestine, initiated as a measure against the 1936–1939 Arab Revolt.

== Etymology ==
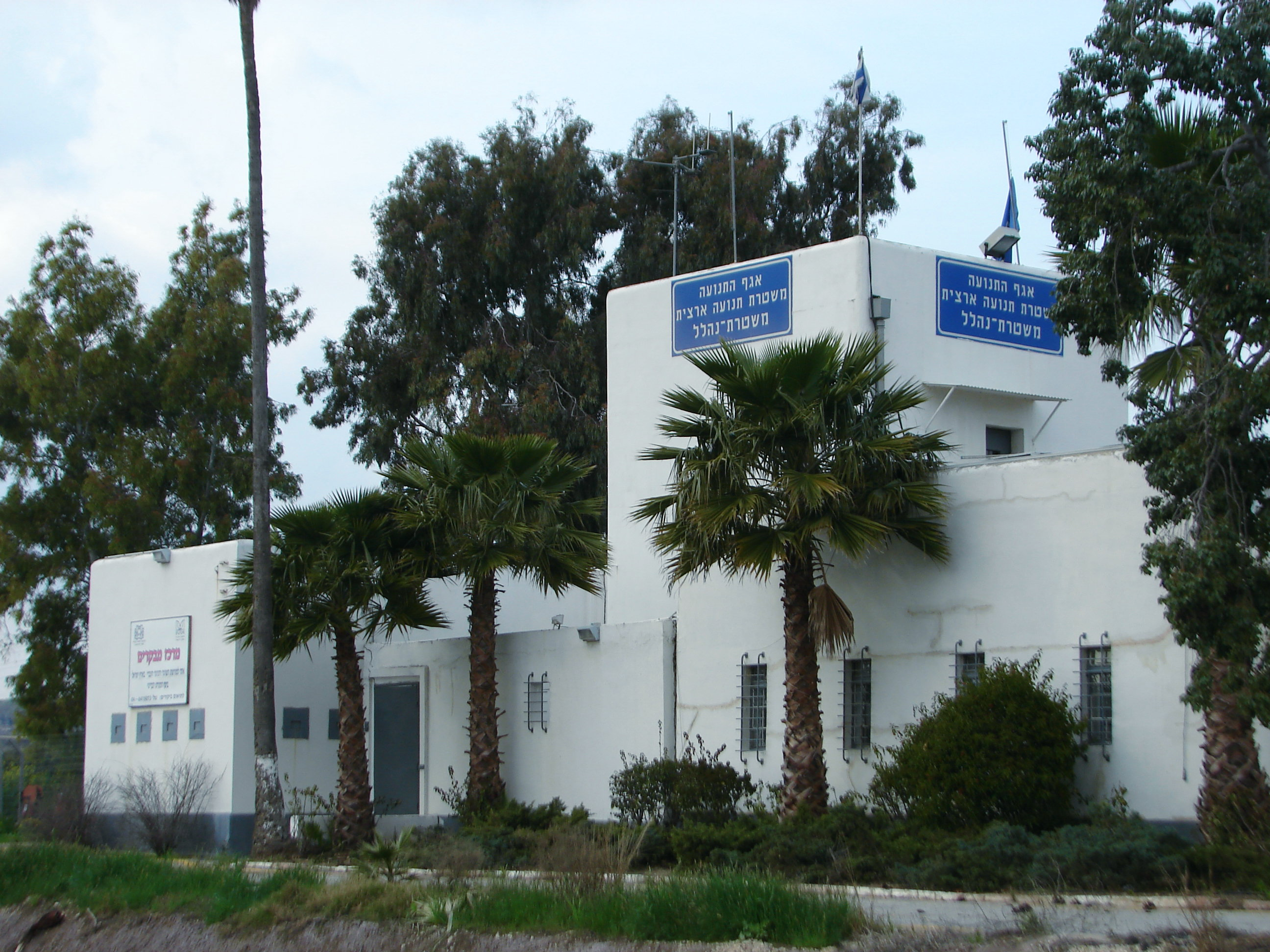
Tegart police station, Nahalal.

The forts are named after their designer, the Irish police officer and engineer Sir Charles Tegart.

In Israel, the name is often pronounced "Taggart". This is probably due to the transliteration of the name to Hebrew and then back to Latin alphabet, along with the translator's wrong assumption that the most common way of writing this anglicised Scottish surname has to be applied ("Taggart" is far more widespread than "Tegart").

== History ==
=== Mandate Palestine ===
Sir Charles Tegart designed the forts in 1938 based on his experiences in the Indian insurgency. They were built of reinforced concrete with water systems that would allow them to withstand a month-long siege.

The contracts for the construction of the forts was given to Solel Boneh, the building arm of the Jewish trade union Histadrut.

==== Types ====
Two types of forts were erected:

Border forts
Five structures were built to reinforce the so-called "Tegart's wall" of the northern border with Lebanon and Syria, using a specific design.
Inland forts
Dozens more, of a different design to the northern forts and sharing a common basic plan, were built at strategic intersections in the interior of Palestine.

=== Israel ===
Many of them can still be seen in Israel today, and continue to be used as police stations and jails. One houses Camp 1391 prison for "high-risk" prisoners.

The Tegart fort in Ma'alot-Tarshiha, now a police station, is being restored as a historical landmark, attracting the attention of preservationists and tourists.

=== West Bank ===
In the West Bank, several such forts, now known as Mukataa (Arabic: المقاطعة, "District") are used as offices and administrative centers of the Palestinian National Authority.

The Ramallah Mukataa, damaged by Israeli forces in the 2002 Operation Defensive Shield and the later siege during the Second Intifada, was later restored and added to under President Mahmoud Abbas, obscuring the lines of the original British structure.

The fort in Hebron was used as the headquarters of the Jordanian administration between 1949 and 1967, of the Israeli military governor between 1967 and 1997, and of the Palestinian Authority's governor between 1997 and 2002. It was destroyed in 2002 during the Second Intifada, when the city was recaptured by Israeli forces in Operation Defensive Shield.

=== Gaza Strip ===
The police station in Gaza City was bombed in 2008.

The fort at Khan Yunis was destroyed during the 1955 Operation Elkayam.

The police station at Sukat as-Sufi stood on the Egyptian border at c. 6-7km SE of Rafah.

== List of Tegart forts in Mandatory Palestine ==
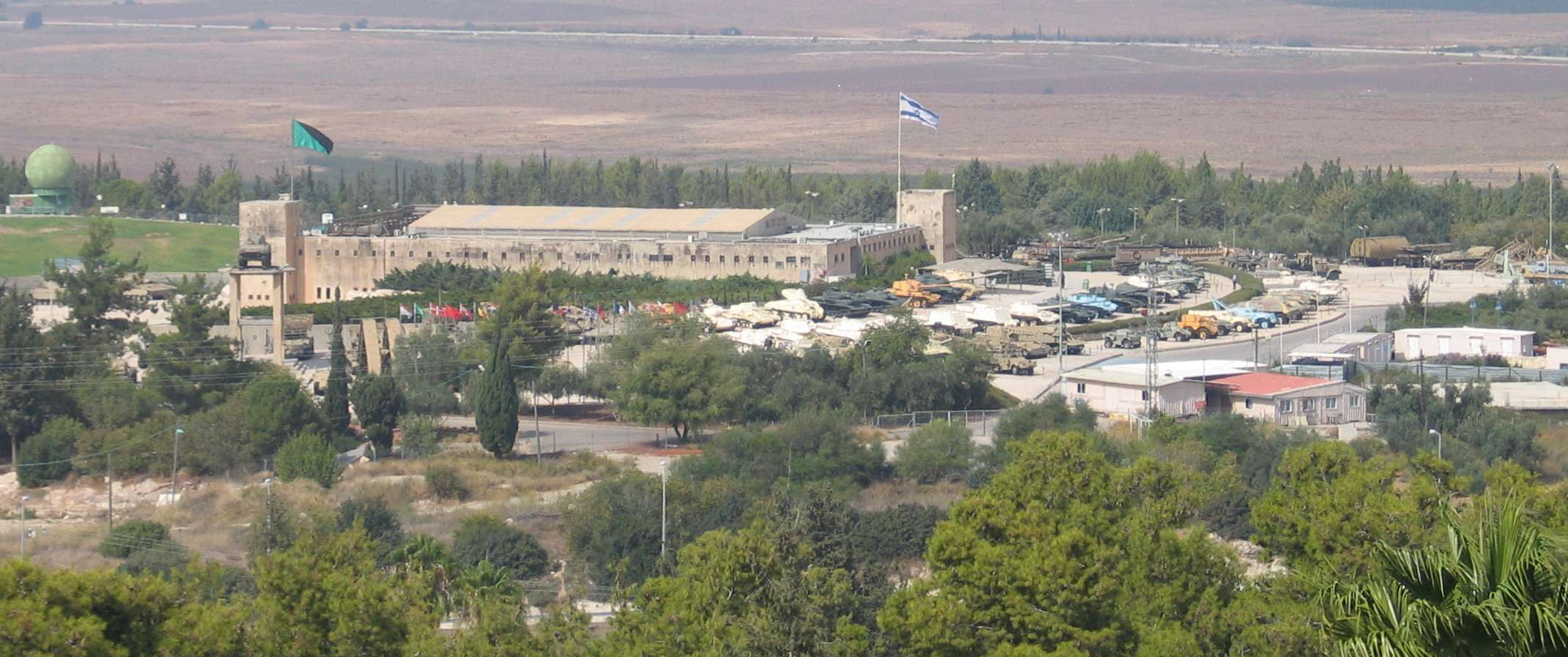
The Latrun Museum

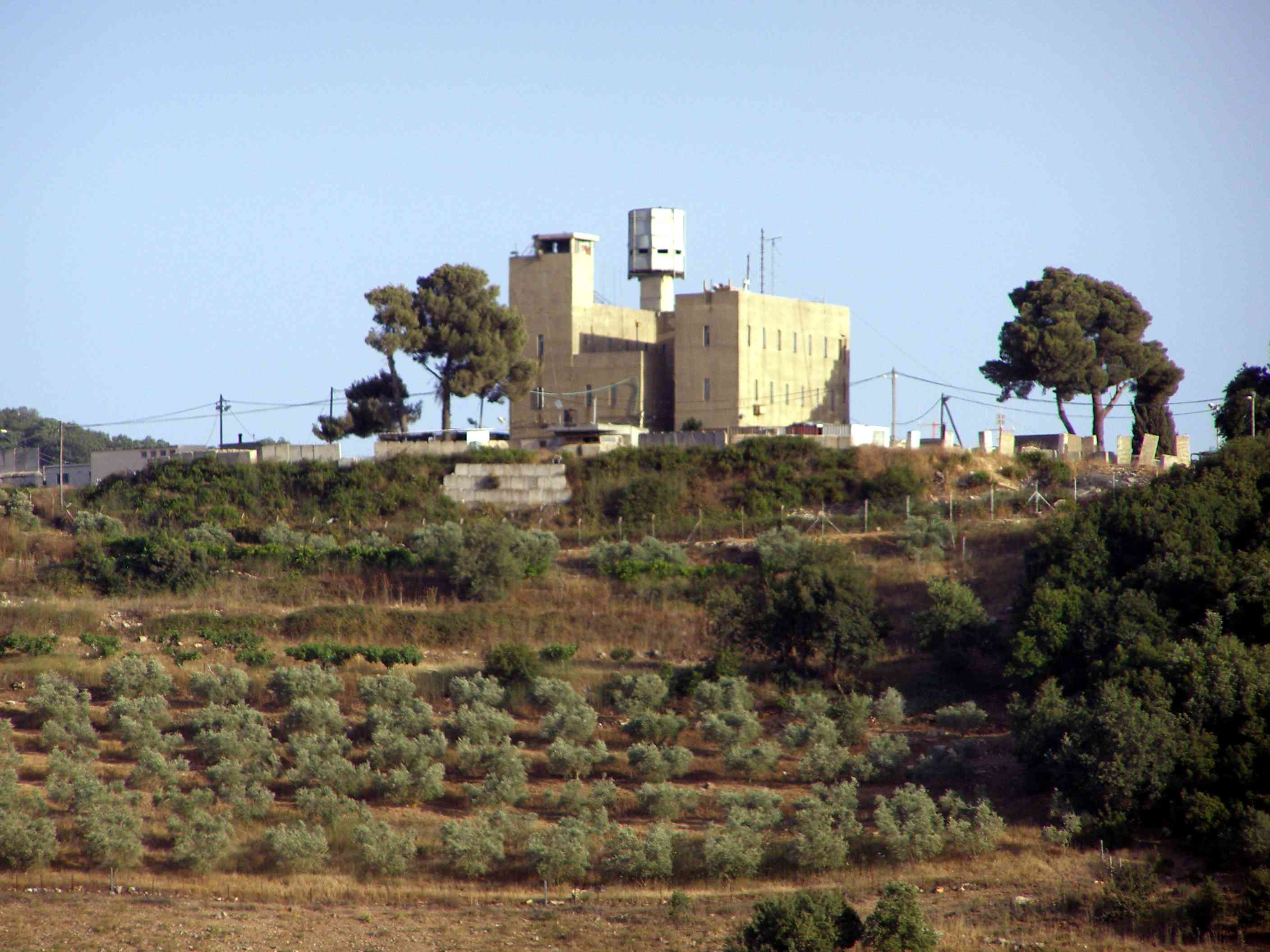
Tegart fort at Kibbutz Sasa

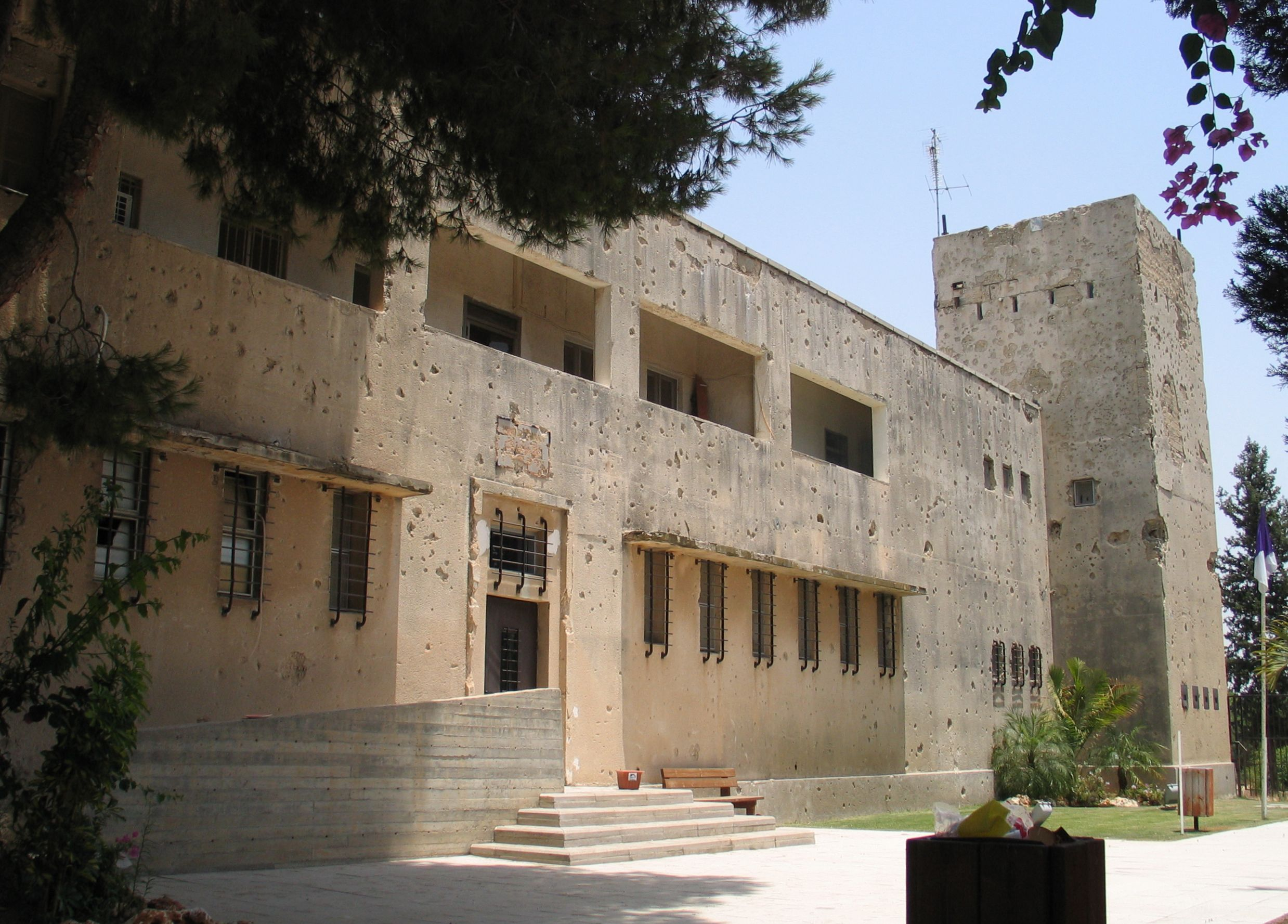
Metzudat Yoav, the Givati Brigade Museum in the former Iraq Suwaydan fort

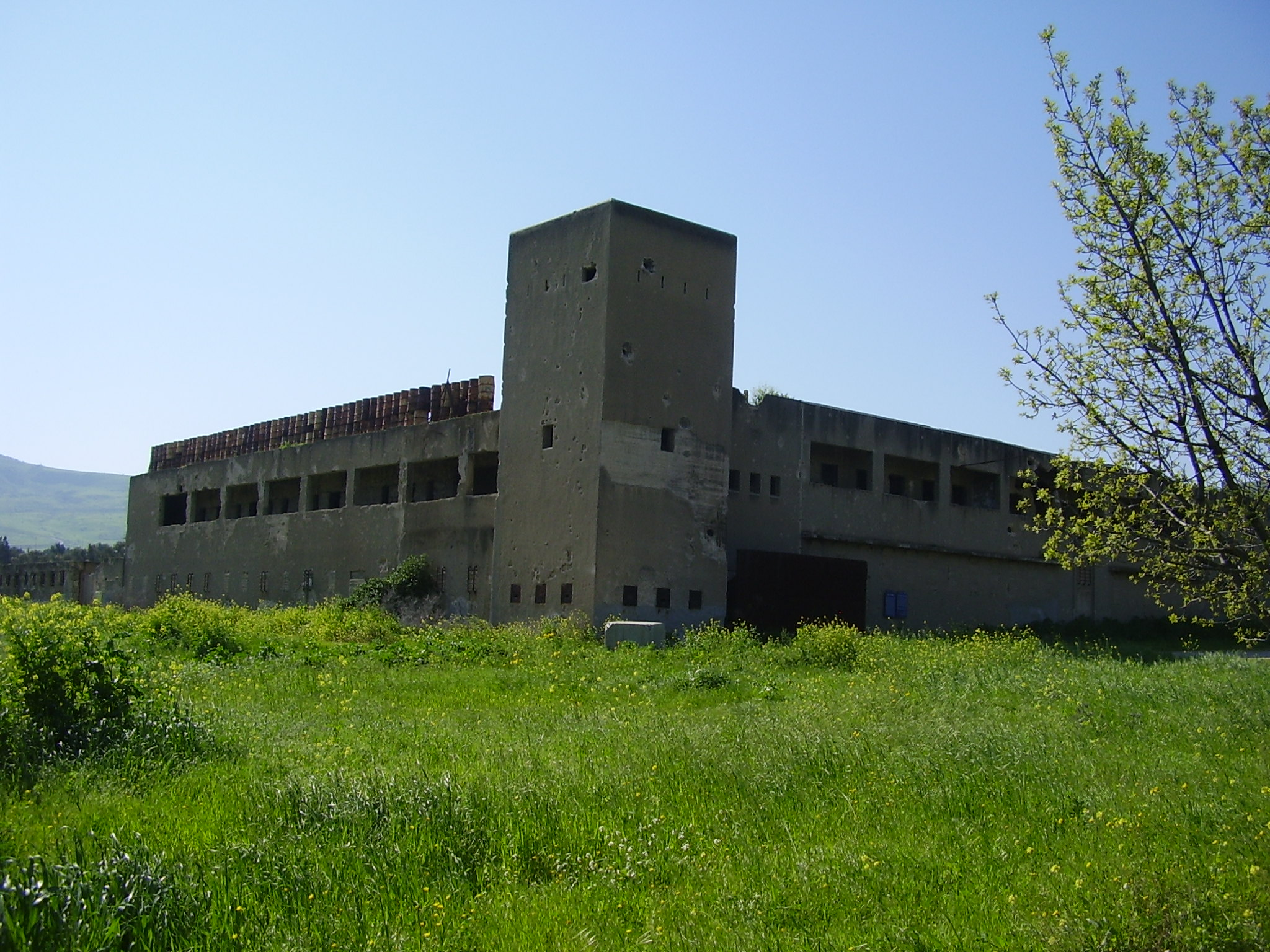
Gesher Police Station

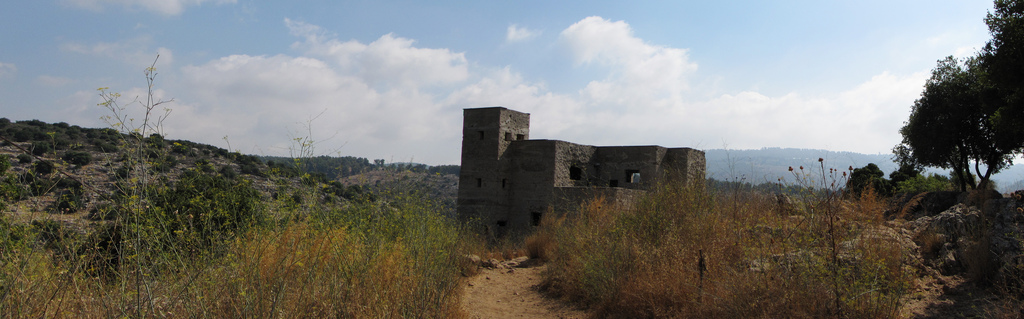
Ein Tina Police Station in Wadi Amud near Hukok

A progressing list. Not all British Mandate police stations listed below correspond to the definition of a "Tegart fort", although they were all part of the same security building project from 1940 to 1941, with later additions.

British name of the fort, current location name (if it changed), history, current state/use:

- Acre police station, now Akko (active)
- Affula police station (active)
- Al-Khalisa police station, now Kiryat Shmona (active)
- Artuf police station, now Beit Shemesh (active)
- Atlit police station, was part of an Israeli military prison, Prison Six, now abandoned
- Bassa police station, now Ya'ara (military base)
- Beersheba police station, now headquarters of the Southern Command
- Beisan police station, now Beit She'an (active)
- Beit Dajan, now Beit Dagan police station (active)
- Beit Jibrin police station, now Beit Guvrin Border Police base
- Beit Lid (Khirbet Beit Lid) police station, now Ashmoret maximum security prison at HaSharon or Beit Lid Junction near Ganot Hadar
- Beit Shemesh police station (active)
- Bethlehem - 2 police stations, one is now the local seat of the Palestinian Authority
- Damun police station, now Damon Prison on Mount Carmel
- Deir Qaddis police station
- Dhahiriya police station
- Ein Tina police station in Wadi Amud near Hukok (abandoned). Also Ein at-Tina, Ein-a-Tina, Ein et-Tina.
- Fara police station, at Far'a refugee camp near Nablus, now a Palestinian prison
- Farradiyya police station, depopulated village near Shefer and Parod (abandoned; see Commons entry)
- Gaza police station, bombed in 2008-11, today Al-Saraya park
- Gesher police station (abandoned; heritage site near Old Gesher)
- Hadera police station (active)
- El Hamme police station, now Hamat Gader; destroyed or abandoned (?), in military area on the border.
- Hebron police station (destroyed 2001)
- Iraq Suweidan police station ("Metzudat Yoav Shenkar" - Yoav Shenkar Fortress), now the Givati Brigade Museum
- Jalame police station, now Kishon Detention Center near Haifa
- Jenin police station, now the local seat of the Palestinian Authority
- Jericho police station, destroyed by the Palestinian Authority
- Jiftlik police station (destroyed? military base?)
- Karkur police station, now Camp 1391 (active)
- Kfar Saba police station (active)
- Khalsa police station; in erased Arab village, mosque still extant in Kiryat Shemona
- Khan Yunis police station ( destroyed 1955)
- Kiryat El Anab police station near Abu Ghosh, served as the initial headquarters of the Givati Brigade and later as a military base; abandoned.
- Kiriat Haim police station in Haifa (active)
- Latrun police station, now the IDF's Armored Corps Memorial Site and Museum
- Lajjun police station near Tel Megiddo, now Megiddo Prison
- Lydda police station, now Lod Border Police Headquarters
- Majdal police station, now Shikma Prison at Ashkelon (maximum security prison)
- Majd al-Krum police station (restaurant)
- Metulla police station
- Nabi Salih police station, now the Halamish (Neveh Tzuf) day care center and girls high school
- Nabi Yusha police station, now the Metzudat Koach Memorial and museum of the 1948 battle
- Nablus - 3 police stations
- Nahalal police station, now the Center for Commemorating the Jewish Supernumerary Police
- Nazareth police station
- Ness Ziona police station. Later used as a military base, closed down in 2006.
- Petah Tiqvah police station (active)
- Qalqilia police station, destroyed by the Israeli army in 1956 as part of a retaliatory operation
- El Qatra police station at Gedera (abandoned)
- Rafah police station
- Ramallah police station, largely destroyed during the Second Intifada, now part of the "Mukataa" presidential HQ of the Palestinian Authority
- Ramat Gan police station (active)
- Ramleh - two police stations:
  - one still active police station
  - Ayalon Prison (maximum security prison) in Ramla
- Rehovot police station (active)
- Rosh Pinna police station
- Salha fort, built in 1938
- Safad - 2 police stations:
  - inner-city municipal police station
  - Mount Canaan police station (in ruins)
- Samakh, the British border guard base (Tsemah Junction near Tiberias), now abandoned
- Sarafand El Kharab police station
- Sa'sa' police post, 4km west of Sa'sa', now military base adjacent to Mattat
- Shafa Amr police station, now Givat Hamishtara near Shfaram: police museum, but closed to the public (as of 2011)
- Shatta police station, now within Shata maximum security prison ( along former Jezreel Valley railway)
- Sukat as-Sufi police station. Also Suqat as-Sufi, Shoket es Sufi. Was on the Egyptian border about 6-7km SE of Rafah, at 0791/0741, now in the Gaza Strip.
- Tarshiha police station (active; is being restored as heritage site)
- Tani (?) police station, now Be'er Tuvia (abandoned)
- Tarbikha police post, now Shomera (part of military base)
- Tel Mond police station, now HaSharon Prison (at Hadarim Interchange)
- Tiberias police station (active)
- Tulkarm police station
- Yatta police station
- Yavne police station
- Zichron Ya'aqov police station (active)

== See also ==
- Shlomo Gur
- Tower and stockade
- Boma (enclosure)
