= Arab Investigation Centres =

Torture, detention, and interrogation centres operated by Israel to control Arab Revolt

The Arab Investigation Centres were operated by the British authorities in Mandatory Palestine during the 1936–1939 Arab revolt. They were used for the detainment and interrogation of suspected Arab insurgents, who were frequently tortured for the duration of their imprisonment.

The centres were established under the aegis of Sir Charles Tegart, who had served extensively in British India. Victims were waterboarded and generally given the ‘third degree’ until they ‘spilled the beans’. One such centre in a Jewish quarter of West Jerusalem was closed only after the city's governor Edward Keith-Roach complained to the High Commissioner. Keith-Roach argued that ‘questionable practises [sic]’ were counter-productive both in terms of the information gathered and the effect on local people's confidence in the police. The Anglican Archdeacon in Palestine believed police abuses were the cause of the violence rather than a response to it. He detailed the daily complaints from Arabs of beatings at the hands of police officers in a letter to the Mandate Chief Secretary in 1936. An Anglican chaplain in Haifa also wrote to the Lord Bishop in Jerusalem, Graham Brown, in December 1937 about an incident he witnessed in which a suspect whose teeth were already knocked out before he was brought into the station was given another beating by the police:

A second man came in who was in plain clothes, but whom I took to be one of the British Police, and I saw him put a severe double arm lock on the man from behind, and then beat him about the head and body in what I can only describe as a brutal and callous way. Once or twice he stopped and turned to the other people in the station, and in an irresponsible and gloating manner said "I'm so sorry"—"I'm awfully sorry." And then proceeded to punch the prisoner round the station again. A third man came in. He was in plain clothes, and was wearing a soft felt hat. He was, I think, British, and may have been a member of the Police Force, but I thought at the time that he was a soldier in civilian clothes .... But this man also made a vicious and violent attack on the prisoner, and punched him about the head and body .... I am gravely disturbed at the possibility that one of the men who was in the station, and who beat up the first person who was brought in was not a member of the police force, but a soldier—this was the man who was wearing a soft felt trilby hat .... I was for two years Chaplain to a prison in England, and in the course of my duties not infrequently witnessed the methods which police and prison warders were compelled to use with men detained or serving long terms of imprisonment, and can only say what I saw on this occasion sickened me and filled me with the gravest misgivings.

Palestinians themselves also made complaints to the authorities. There are accounts in Arabic of suspects being tortured, being beaten until they were unable to walk, being blown to bits, being left in open cages in the sun without sustenance, being beaten with wet ropes, ‘boxed’ and having their teeth smashed, of having their feet burnt with oil and of ‘needles’ being used on suspects and of dogs being set upon Arab detainees. Palestine Police Force officers and Jewish auxiliary forces frequently had Arab insurgents hold heavy stones and then beating them when they dropped them. Prison guards also used bayonets on sleep-deprived men and made them wear bells around their necks and then dance.

Arab prisoners jumped to their deaths from high windows in order to avoid being tortured; some of the torture methods included having their testicles tied with cord, being tortured with strips of wood with nails in, having wire tightened around their big toes, having hair torn from their faces and heads, special instruments being used to extract fingernails, red hot skewers being used on detainees, prisoners being sodomised, boiling oil and intoxicants being used on prisoners, as were electric shocks, and water was funnelled into suspects’ stomachs. There were also mock executions.

Despite protests and revulsion expressed even by British officials and Anglican clergy extrajudicial executions, torture, beatings and general violence remained commonplace responses by the police during the Arab revolt.
