= John Mactaggart =

John Mactaggart or McTaggart may refer to:

- Sir John McTaggart, 1st Baronet (1789–1867), Scottish Liberal MP in the British Parliament
- John Mactaggart (writer) (1791–1830), Scottish author and engineer
- John MacTaggart (1823–1871), early settler of Kilkivan, Queensland
- J. M. E. McTaggart (John McTaggart Ellis McTaggart, 1866–1925), English idealist metaphysician
- Sir John Mactaggart, 1st Baronet (1867–1956), Scottish builder
- John McTaggart (jockey) (1896–1946), American jockey
- Sir John Mactaggart, 2nd Baronet (1898–1960), Scottish businessman, son of the 1st Baronet; see Mactaggart baronets
- Sir John Mactaggart, 4th Baronet (born 1951), Scottish businessman and philanthropist, grandson of the above
- John Auld Mactaggart (born 1993), heir of the above
