= Taggart (surname) =

- Language: Irish

Origin
- Meaning: "son of the priest"
- Region of origin: Ireland

Other names
- Variant forms: MacTaggart, McTaggart

Taggart is a surname of Scottish and Irish origin. It is a reduction of the surnames MacTaggart and McTaggart, which are anglicisations of the Irish Mac an t-Sagairt, meaning "son of the priest". The name is sometimes written Teggart or Tegart or Tagart or Tagert.

== List of persons with the surname Taggart ==
- Adam Taggart (born 1993), Australian footballer
- Andrew Taggart (born 1989), American musician, The Chainsmokers
- Ben Taggart (1889–1947), American actor
- Sir Charles Tegart (1881–1946), British police officer and engineer
- Cynthia Taggart (1801–1849), American poet
- Edward Tagart (1804–1858), English Unitarian divine
- Errol Taggart (1895–1940), Canadian director and film editor
- Gerry Taggart (born 1970), British footballer
- Grantham Israel Taggart (1828–1905), American merchant
- Jack Taggart (1950–2022), Canadian ice hockey player
- James Gordon Taggart (1892–1974), Canadian civil servant and politician
- Jeremy Taggart (born 1973), Canadian drummer, Our Lady Peace
- Joan Taggart (1917–2003), Australian politician
- Joseph Taggart (1867–1938), American politician
- Kelly E. Taggart (1932–2014), American admiral and civil engineer
- Millee Taggart, American actress
- Noel Tagart (1878–1913), English cricketer
- Phil Taggart (born 1987), Northern Irish radio presenter
- Rick Taggart, American politician from Colorado
- Rita Taggart, American actress
- Samuel Taggart (1754–1825), American politician
- Scott Taggart (born 1991), Scottish footballer
- Shawn Taggart (born 1985), American basketball player
- Tamara Taggart (born 1968), Canadian television presenter
- Thomas Taggart (1856–1929), American politician
- William Taggart (1733–1798), American jurist from Rhode Island
- Willie Taggart (born 1976), American football coach

== See also ==
- Taggart (disambiguation) for fictional characters with the surname Taggart
