= Solel Boneh =

Israeli construction and civil engineering company

- Type: Public company
- Industry: Construction, Civil engineering, Infrastructure, Roads and Logistics planning
- Founded: 1921; 105 years ago
- Founder: The Histadrut
- Headquarters: Airport City, Israel
- Key people: Asaf Inbar (CEO); Tamir Cohen (head of directors)
- Revenue: 1.7 billion USD in 2004
- Owner: Housing & Construction Holding Company Limited
- Website: www.solbo.co.il

Solel Boneh (Hebrew: סולל בונה, lit. 'Paving and Building') is the oldest, and one of the largest construction and civil engineering companies in Israel.

== History ==
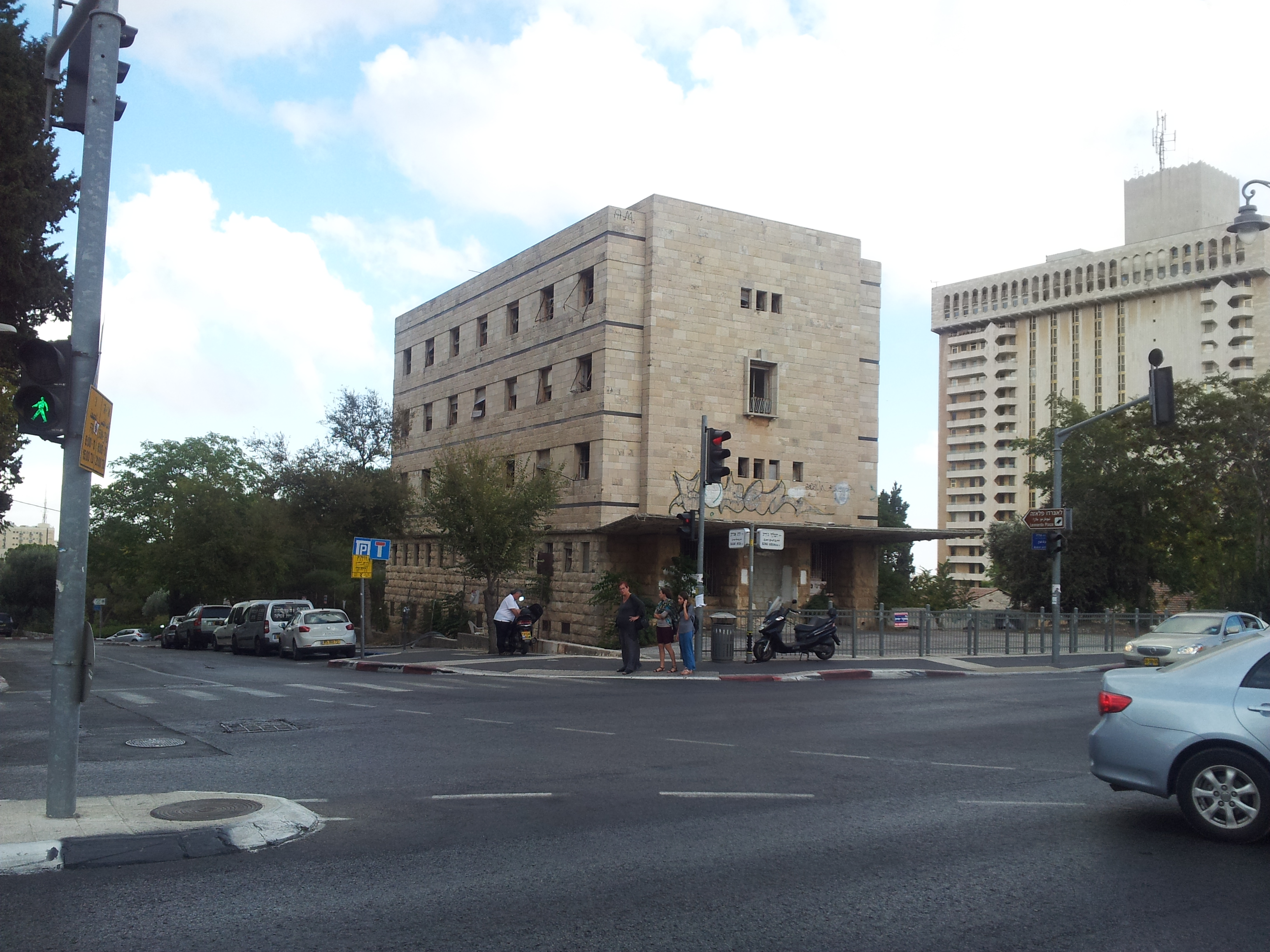
Historic Solel Boneh building in Jerusalem

=== During British rule (1921–1948) ===
Solel Boneh was founded in 1921 in the British-ruled Mandatory Palestine, during the first conference of the Jewish trade union, the General Histadrut, under the name of Batz (בע״ץ), an acronym of Binyan veAvodot Tziburiot (בניין ועבודות ציבוריות, lit. Construction and Public Works). Its first project was to pave a road from Tiberias to Samakh, which is now part of Highway 90. The company was founded as a cooperative organisation in the spirit of socialist workers' groups. In 1927, it was declared bankrupt, partly due to its supplementing the wages of Jewish workers. It was resurrected by the Histadrut and the World Zionist Organization as a company named Solel Boneh, now managed as a business corporation.

Solel Boneh played an integral role in major construction projects in Mandatory Palestine. Among other projects, the company built Tegart's wall in 1938. It also built the Tegart forts and prefabricated the buildings for the Tower and Stockade campaign. During the Mandate era it built bridges, airfields, bases for the British Army and army projects in Iraq, Egypt, Bahrain and Cyprus. It had branches in Beirut and Damascus.

In 2915, Solel Boneh employed 3,000 workers across various public works projects, including 139 women in construction. It had a policy of only employing Jews, which was relaxed in 1954.

=== Israel, trade union ownership (1948–1996) ===
After statehood was achieved in 1948, Solel Boneh continued to play a major role in Israeli construction projects.

Solel Boneh helped strengthen the Israel Defense Forces during the 1948 Arab–Israeli War, and it built strongholds and systems to supply water, in practice becoming the basis of the first logistics unit in the IDF.

In 1961, shares of Solel Boneh were first traded on the Tel Aviv Stock Exchange.

Israeli firms, such as Solel Boneh, were often involved in building projects in Africa during the 1960s and 1970s. One reason Operation Entebbe in 1976 was so well-planned was that the building in which the hostages were being held had been built by Solel Boneh, which still had the blueprints, and supplied them to the Israeli government.

From 1960–1969, Solel Boneh carried out the construction of the Basilica of the Annunciation in Nazareth.

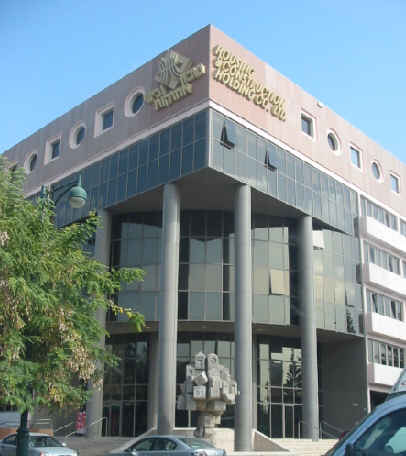
Headquarters in Ramat Gan

In 1984, a subsidiary, Solel Boneh Building and Infrastructure, was founded under full control of the parent company. In 1989, control of Solel Boneh was passed on to the Housing & Construction Holding Company Limited (Shikun U'Binui).

=== Privatisation (1996) ===
In 1996, control of that holding company, including Solel Boneh, was obtained by Ted Arison and after his death in 1999 later it was passed on to his daughter, Shari Arison.

== See also ==
- Economy of Israel
- Architecture of Israel
