= Operation Elkayam =

- Part of the Retribution operations (during Palestinian Fedayeen insurgency)
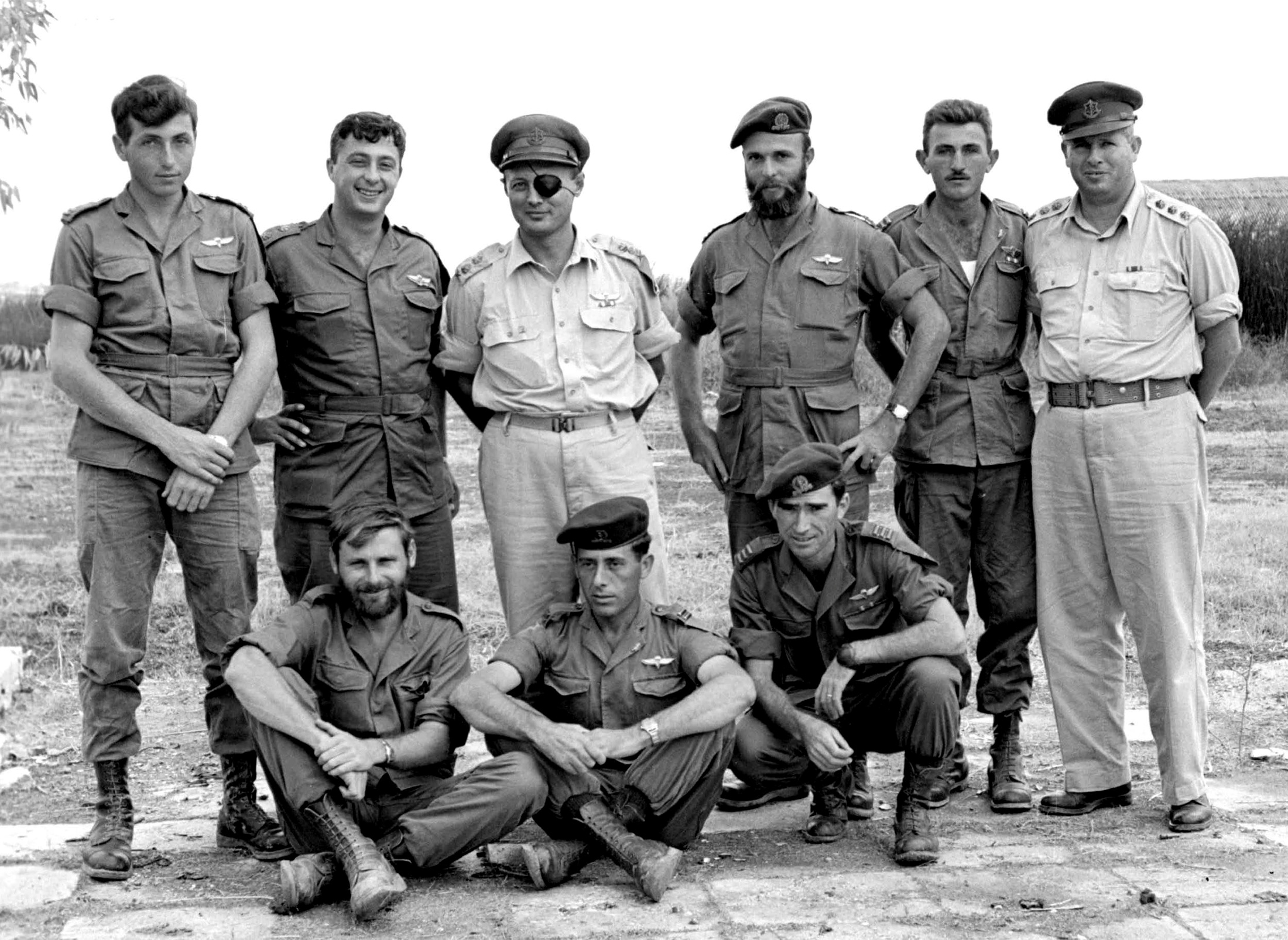
- Rafael Eitan (right, in crouched position) with members of 890th Paratroop Battalion. Standing second from left is Ariel Sharon, commander of the battalion.
Date	August 31, 1955
Location	Khan Yunis, Gaza
Result	Israeli victory

Belligerents
Israel	Egypt

Commanders and leaders
Ariel Sharon; Mordechai Gur; Rafael Eitan	

Casualties and losses
1 killed	72 killed

Operation Elkayam (Hebrew: מבצע אלקיים), also known as the Khan Yunis raid, was an Israeli military operation that targeted Egyptian military positions in the Khan Yunis area. The successful operation resulted in the destruction of Egyptian military installations as well as the deaths of seventy-two Egyptian soldiers. There was one Israeli fatality.

== Background ==
The 1948 Arab-Israeli War resulted in a decisive Israeli victory. However, the Arab nations remained intransigent and were only willing to sign armistice agreements with Israel. Thus, a static situation of “no war, no peace,” emerged. Moreover, hundreds of thousands of Arab refugees now camped alongside Israel’s porous borders. The refugees lived in squalor, were kept under martial law and were prevented from gaining citizenship in their respective Arab host countries. Arab governments, in particular Egypt, sensing the refugees’ discontent, capitalized on the opportunity to recruit embittered Palestinian Arabs for terrorist actions against Israel. At first, the infiltrations and border transgressions took the form of petty banditry and thievery. However, by 1954, Egyptian military intelligence was taking an active role in providing various forms of support for Palestinian Arab (fedayeen) terrorist activity. After one such atrocity, Israel decided to take decisive action against Egypt for its sponsorship of terror and initiated Operation Black Arrow. Despite its success, Operation Black Arrow did not put a halt to Egyptian sponsorship of fedayeen terror raids and border transgressions. In late August 1955, attacks by Egyptian sponsored fedayeen near the Israeli towns of Rishon LeZion and Rechovot resulted in the deaths of eleven Israelis. It was therefore decided that an operation, larger in scope and size than anything previously embarked upon, was warranted.

== The battle ==
On the night of August 31, 1955, paratroops of Israel’s vaunted 890th Battalion assembled to attack Egyptian military installations in Khan Yunis. Among their objectives was a Tegart fort which housed a company of infantry as well as headquarters personnel. A second objective was the taking of an Egyptian emplacement, code-named Position 132, which dominated the Khan Yunis road and was deemed vital to securing the safe withdrawal of the troops. The raid was codenamed Operation Elkayam, in tribute to Saadya Elkayam, a company commander who died in the Black Arrow operation. During the late evening, a mechanized force led by commander Mordechai "Motta" Gur set out for the fort and surrounding installations while forces led by Rafael "Raful" Eitan secured Position 132. Another force set up an ambush site in case the Egyptians decided to send a relief column. By 22:45 hours, the fort and surrounding emplacements had been secured. Position 132 had been abandoned by the Egyptians and the Israelis destroyed the Egyptian emplacements there. Explosive charges were set and the Tergart fort along with other nearby Egyptian emplacements were dynamited and reduced to rubble. The Egyptians suffered seventy-two killed. There was one Israeli fatality.

== Aftermath ==
Operation Elkayam was the first time that the Israelis employed mounted armor in their reprisal raids. The raid itself was a resounding success clearly reflected by the lopsided casualty count in Israel’s favor. The operation prompted the Egyptians to reassess their sponsorship of fedayeen operations and led to a U.N. mediated ceasefire on September 4. President Nasser halted fedayeen infiltration from the Egyptian border resulting in a temporary lull in fedayeen attacks. Nevertheless, other Egyptian provocations, including the blockade of the Gulf of Eilat, were factors that led to Israel’s Operation Kadesh and the decisive defeat of the Egyptian army in the Sinai Peninsula.
