= Shikma Prison =

Prison in Ashkelon, Israel

Coordinates: 31.664454°N 34.595566°E

Shikma Prison (Hebrew: בית סוהר שקמה) is an Israeli prison located in Ashkelon.

There are many Palestinian prisoners there including the engineer Dirar Abu Sisi who was kidnapped in Ukraine in February 2011. Among the former prisoners is Israeli scientist Mordechai Vanunu.

== See also ==
- Tegart fort, including the one inside Shikma Prison
