= Taggart, Virginia =

Unincorporated community in Virginia, United States

Coordinates: 37°43′23″N 78°25′17″W

Taggart is an unincorporated community in Buckingham County, in the U.S. state of Virginia.
