= Sir John Mactaggart, 4th Baronet =

Scottish businessman and philanthropist (born 1951)

Sir John Auld Mactaggart, 4th Baronet (born 21 January 1951) is a Scottish businessman and philanthropist.

Mactaggart was educated at Shrewsbury School and Trinity College, Cambridge.

Mactaggart was Chairman of Central Holdings from 1981 to 1992, Chairman of Western Heritable Investment Co. since 1987, Chairman of Bruichladdich Distillery Company from 2004 until 2012, Chairman of Waterford Distillery Company since 2014 and Renegade Spirits Grenada since 2016. Mactaggart has been involved in a number of charitable organizations, including Thames Valley Housing Association, The Head Injuries Trust for Scotland, Defeating Deafness, Action on Hearing Loss, The Scottish Ballet, Commonweal Housing and Grove End Housing Association amongst others.

in 1977 He married firstly to Patricia, youngest daughter of Major Harry Alastair Gordon, M.C. and Lady Joan Patricia Quirk, daughter of Field Marshal Archibald Wavell, 1st Earl Wavell. They divorced in 1990. In 1991, he married Caroline, youngest daughter of Eric Charles Williams, of Fair Acre, Esher, Surrey; and had four children with her, Kinvara May (b. 1992), John Auld (b. 1993), the hair apparent, Sholto Auld (b. 1996), and Aphra Hope (b. 1999). He lastly married Helena van der Kun, the former wife of retired first class cricketer Matthew Fosh.

Sir John is the older brother of the Right Honourable Fiona Mactaggart, Labour Party MP for Slough from 1997 to 2017.

Baronetage of the United Kingdom
Preceded by Ian Auld Mactaggart	Baronet (of King's Park); 1987–present	Incumbent
