= Al-Khalisa =

al-Khalisa الخالصة al-Khalsa
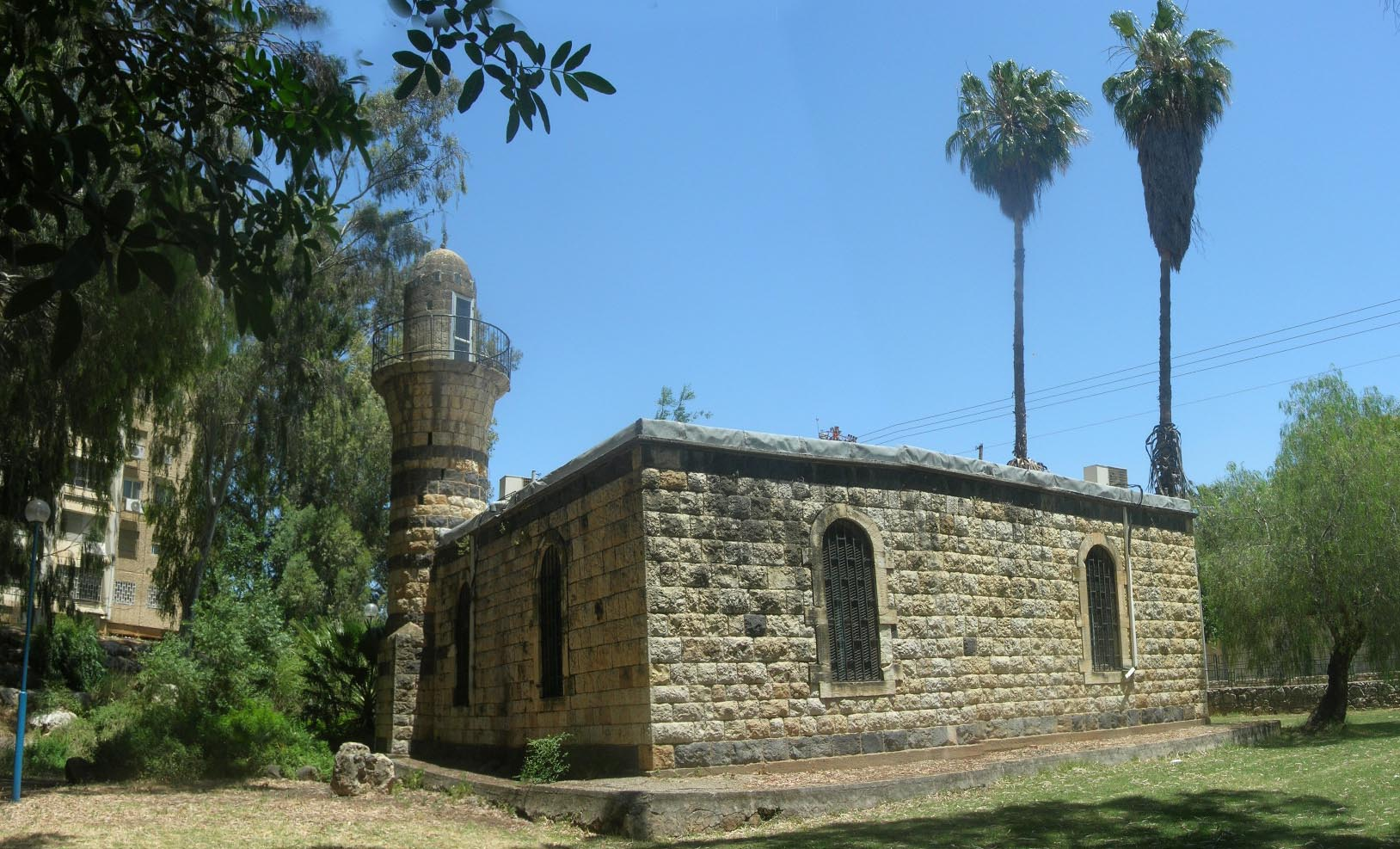
- The mosque of al-Khalisa, currently a museum for the history of Kiryat Shemona
- Etymology: Pure, sincere
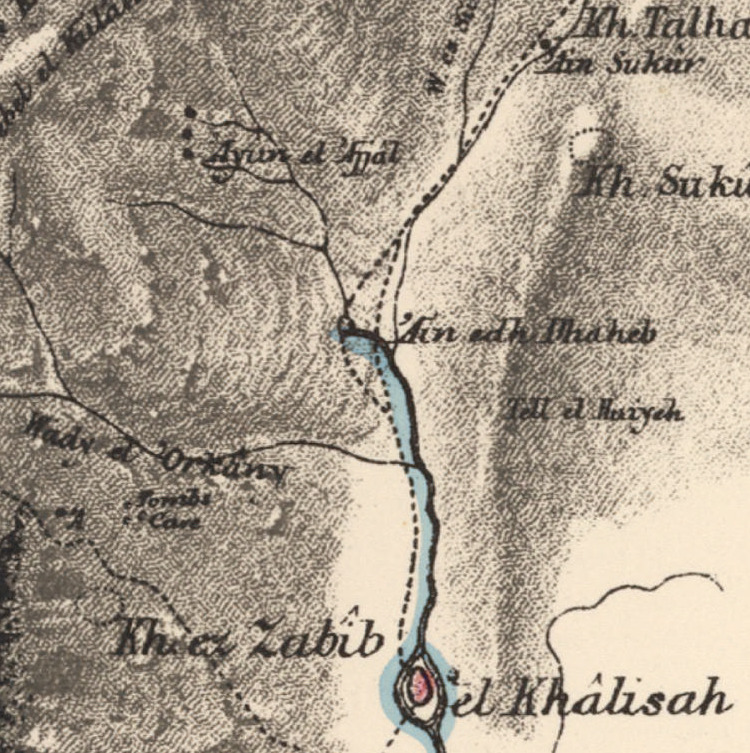
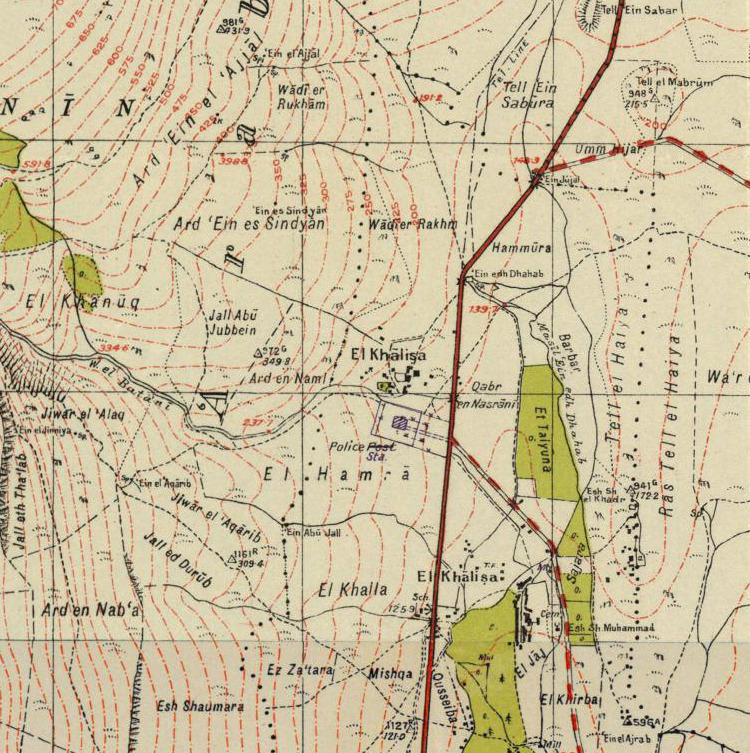
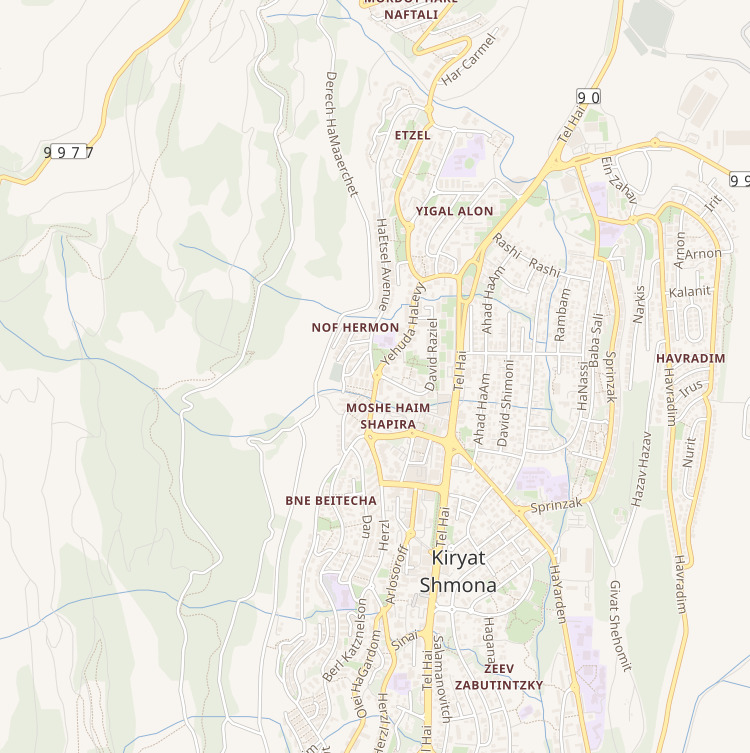
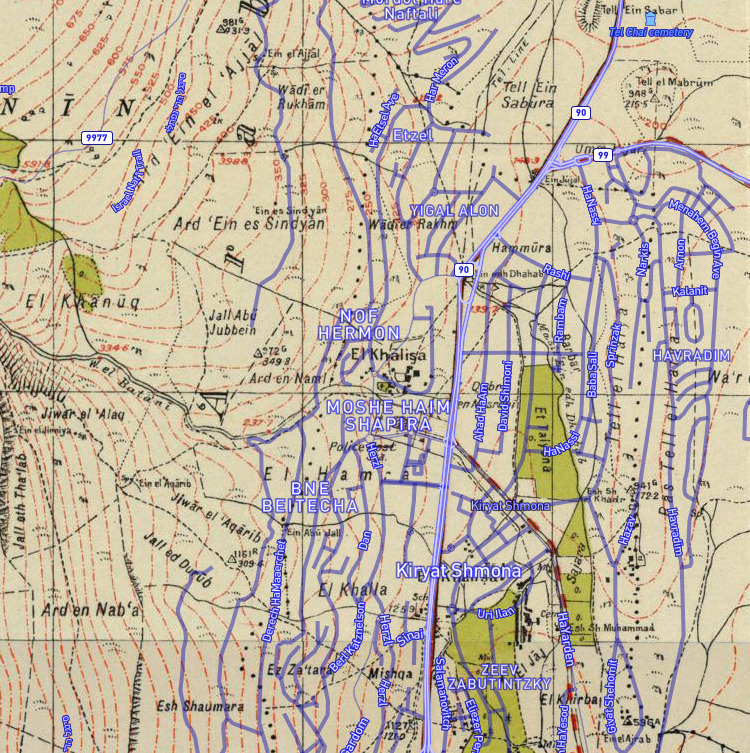
- 1870s map 1940s map modern map 1940s with modern overlay map A series of historical maps of the area around Al-Khalisa (click the buttons)

- Location within Mandatory Palestine
- Coordinates: 33°12′52″N 35°34′02″E
- Palestine grid: 203/290
- Geopolitical entity: Mandatory Palestine
- Subdistrict: Safad
- Date of depopulation: May 11, 1948

Area
  - Total: 11.3 km^{2} (4.4 sq mi)

Population (1945)
  - Total: 1,840
- Cause(s) of depopulation: Influence of nearby town's fall
- Secondary cause: Whispering campaign
- Current Localities: Kiryat Shemona

Al-Khalisa was a Palestinian Arab village situated on a low hill on the northwestern edge of the Hula Valley of over 1,800 located 28 kilometers (17 mi) north of Safad. It was depopulated in the 1948 Palestine war.

== History ==
Al-Khalisa was founded by the Bedouin from the 'Arab al-Ghawarina clan, who constituted the bulk of the village's population. Under the Ottoman Empire, in the 1596 tax records, it had a population of 29 Muslim households, an estimated 160 persons, and was under the administration of the nahiya ("subdistrict") of Jira, part of Sanjak Safad. The villagers paid a fixed tax rate of 25% on various agricultural products, including wheat, barley, orchards, beehives, in addition to water buffalos and a water-powered mill; a total of 5,449 akçe.

In 1875, Victor Guérin traveled in the region, and noted about Al-Khalisa (which he called Khalsah): "At the bottom and west of this tell, is a small village of very recent foundation, called Khalsah; it was built on the site and partly with the materials of another older one. The gardens that surround it are watered by the waters of l'A'ïn Dahab." In 1881, the PEF's Survey of Western Palestine described al-Khalisa as a village built of stone, surrounded by streams, with a population of 50.

=== British Mandate era ===
The houses of the village were built of bricks and basalt stones cut from the hillside. Al-Khalisa had a boys' elementary school which also admitted students from neighboring villages. The residents drew their drinking water from several springs. It was one of five villages in the Galilee to be governed by a village council that administered in local affairs.

The leader of 'Arab al-Ghawarina clan was Sheikh Kamal Hussein al-Youssef, resident of Al-Khalisa, his forefathers controlled the Hula Valley from the 17th century. According to Meron Benvenisti, he led the raid on Tel Hai in 1920 while searching for Frenchmen. In the years preceding 1948, Sheikh Kamal established close relationships with the Jewish settlers, contributed to the establishment of Jewish settlements in the Hula Valley by helping them buy land, selling land to the Jewish National Fund, maintain peace and security, particularly during the 1936-9 revolt. He also joined the British during World War II to help defeat the Nazis from the French Vichy regime in Syria. But, according to Benvenisti, the veterans of Kfar Giladi did not forget or forgive, and cultivated Sheikh Kamal's enemy Emir Faour. In March 1949, after the Nakba, Sheikh Kamal reported on the Palestinians refugee’s state of mind: “All the refugees in Lebanon want to return. None of them have settled down; they’re not allowed to work, particularly not agricultural work. The Red Cross organization in Lebanon which is staffed entirely by Lebanese officials is stealing all it can; very little reaches the refugees.” Sheikh Kamal Hussein al-Youssef was murdered in 1949 by a Syrian intelligence agent.

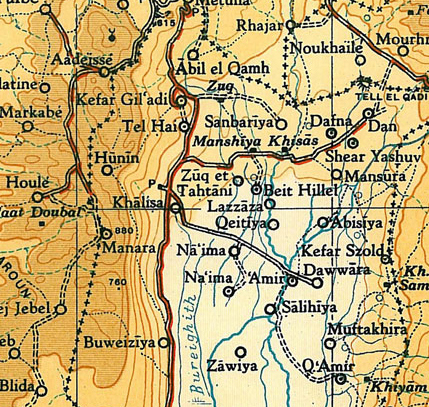
Al-Khalisa, 1946

In the 1931 census of Palestine, the population of El Khalisa was 1,369; 1,340 Muslims, 3 Jews and 26 Christians, in a total of 259 houses.

In the 1945 statistics, its population was 1,840, of which 20 were Christians, and the total land area were 11,280 dunams. Of this, 5,586 dunams were irrigated or used for plantations, 3,775 for cereals, while 20 dunams were classified as urban land.

=== 1948, and after ===
The residents of al-Khalisa fled their homes on 11 May 1948 following the rejection of approaches made by them to the Haganah asking for an "agreement". According to Yigal Allon, the commander of Operation Yiftach, the villagers left following his Whispering Campaign. This involved instructing the leaders of Jewish villages in the area to warn their neighbours that "a great Jewish reinforcement has arrived in Galilee and that it is going to burn all the villages of the Huleh." Post-war IDF analysis seems to undermine this claim. Allon himself writes that the fall of Safad and the success of Operation Matateh were also reasons for the villagers departure. He describes them as some of "the tens of thousands of sulky Arabs who remained in Galilee." He also states that "The building of the police station at Halsa (al-Khalisa) fell into our hands without a shot."

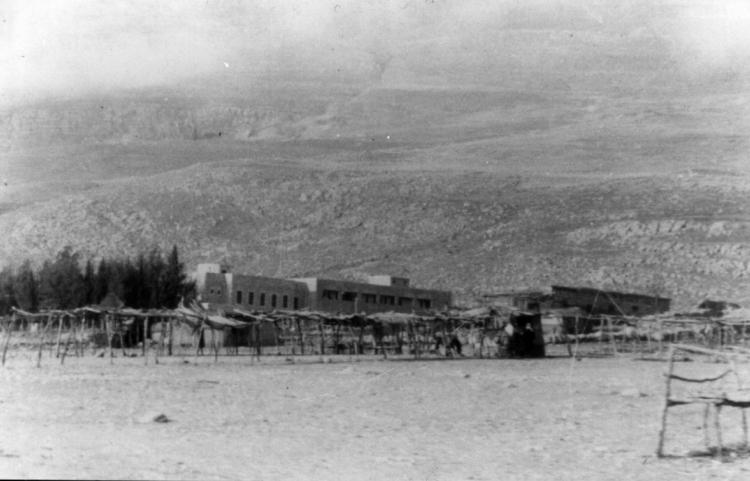
Al Khalisa police station, 1948

The village's residents stated that after they fled, only the local militia remained, but withdrew after shelling from the Jewish town of Manara and after seeing an armored unit approaching al-Khalisa. Former villagers, interviewed in Tel al-Zaatar camp in Lebanon in 1973, recounted that when they returned to the village;

We found that the Jews had burned and destroyed the houses belonging to Ali Zakayan, Abu Ali Muhammad Hamadih, Mustafa al-Haj Yusif, Issa Muhammad, Ali Salih Ahmad, Muhammad Arab al-Haj Mahmud, Salih Ismail, Sari al-Khadir, Dawud Hussein, Abdul-Raziq Hamid, Qassim Muhammead al-Salih and Ali Hussein Mahmud ... The village was in ruins.

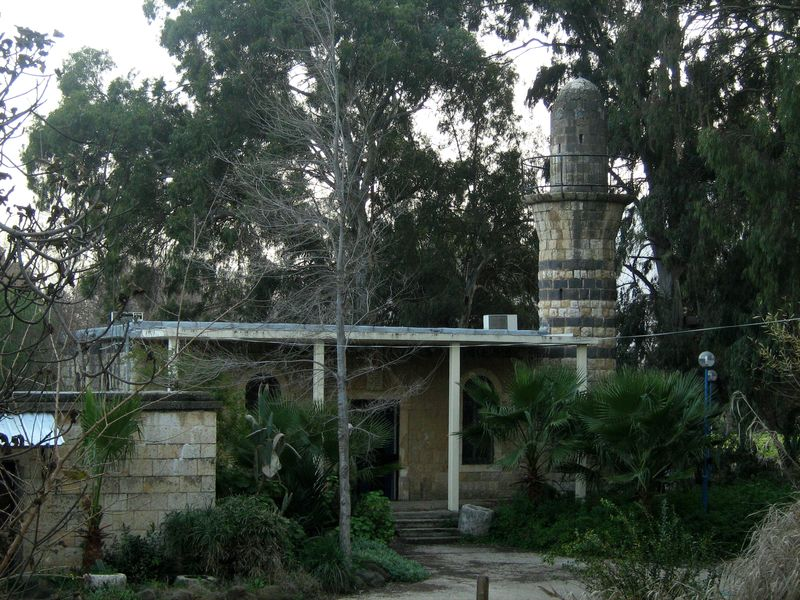
The mosque of Al-Khalisa, 2008, now serving as museum for Kiryat Shemona

According to Walid Khalidi, 1992, "stone rubble from the houses markes the site. The school and the Mandate government´s office buildings stand abandoned, as does the village mosque and minaret. The level land surrounding the site is cultivated by settlement of Qirat Shemona, while the mountainous areas are either used as pastures or are wooded."

According to Meron Benvenisti, 2000, "the mosque of al-Khalsa, one of the few structures that remain of that Galilee Arab village, is situated in a municipal park in the older section of the Jewish town of Kiryat Shemona. It serves as the local museum dedicated to the memory of townspeople who have fallen in Israel's various wars."

== See also ==
- Depopulated Palestinian locations in Israel

== Bibliography ==
- Anglo-American Committee of Inquiry (1945–1946). A Survey of Palestine, prepared by the British Mandate for UN prior to proposing the 1947 partition plan.
- Benvenisti, M. (2000). Sacred Landscape: The Buried History of the Holy Land Since 1948. University of California Press. ISBN 0-520-21154-5.
- Chapman, Colin (1983). Whose Promised Land. Lion Publishing. ISBN 0-85648-522-5.
- Conder, C.R.; Kitchener, H.H. (1881). The Survey of Western Palestine: Memoirs of the Topography, Orography, Hydrography, and Archaeology. Vol. 1. London: Committee of the Palestine Exploration Fund.
- Government of Palestine, Department of Statistics (1945). Village Statistics, April, 1945.
- Guérin, V. (1880). Description Géographique Historique et Archéologique de la Palestine (in French). Vol. 3: Galilee, pt. 2. Paris: L'Imprimerie Nationale.
- Hadawi, S. (1970). Village Statistics of 1945: A Classification of Land and Area ownership in Palestine. Palestine Liberation Organization Research Center. Archived from the original on 2018-12-08.
- Hütteroth, W.-D.; Abdulfattah, K. (1977). Historical Geography of Palestine, Transjordan and Southern Syria in the Late 16th Century. Erlanger Geographische Arbeiten, Sonderband 5. Erlangen, Germany: Vorstand der Fränkischen Geographischen Gesellschaft. ISBN 3-920405-41-2.
- Khalidi, W. (1992). All That Remains:The Palestinian Villages Occupied and Depopulated by Israel in 1948. Washington D.C.: Institute for Palestine Studies. ISBN 0-88728-224-5.
- Mills, E., ed. (1932). Census of Palestine 1931. Population of Villages, Towns and Administrative Areas. Jerusalem: Government of Palestine.
- Morris, B. (1987). The Birth of the Palestinian refugee problem, 1947-1949. Cambridge University Press. ISBN 0-521-33028-9.
- Morris, B. (2004). The Birth of the Palestinian Refugee Problem Revisited. Cambridge University Press. ISBN 978-0-521-00967-6.
- Nazzal, Nafez (1978). The Palestinian Exodus from Galilee 1948. The Institute for Palestine Studies.
- Palmer, E.H. (1881). The Survey of Western Palestine: Arabic and English Name Lists Collected During the Survey by Lieutenants Conder and Kitchener, R. E. Transliterated and Explained by E.H. Palmer. Committee of the Palestine Exploration Fund.
- Petersen, Andrew (2001). A Gazetteer of Buildings in Muslim Palestine (British Academy Monographs in Archaeology). Vol. 1. Oxford University Press. ISBN 978-0-19-727011-0. Archived from the original on 2021-05-28. (Khalisa, p. 197 Archived 2016-10-10 at the Wayback Machine)
- Rhode, H. (1979). Administration and Population of the Sancak of Safed in the Sixteenth Century (PhD). Columbia University. Archived from the original on 2020-03-01.
