= Charles Tegart =

British police officer in Calcutta and Palestine

Sir Charles Tegart KCIE MVO KPM JP
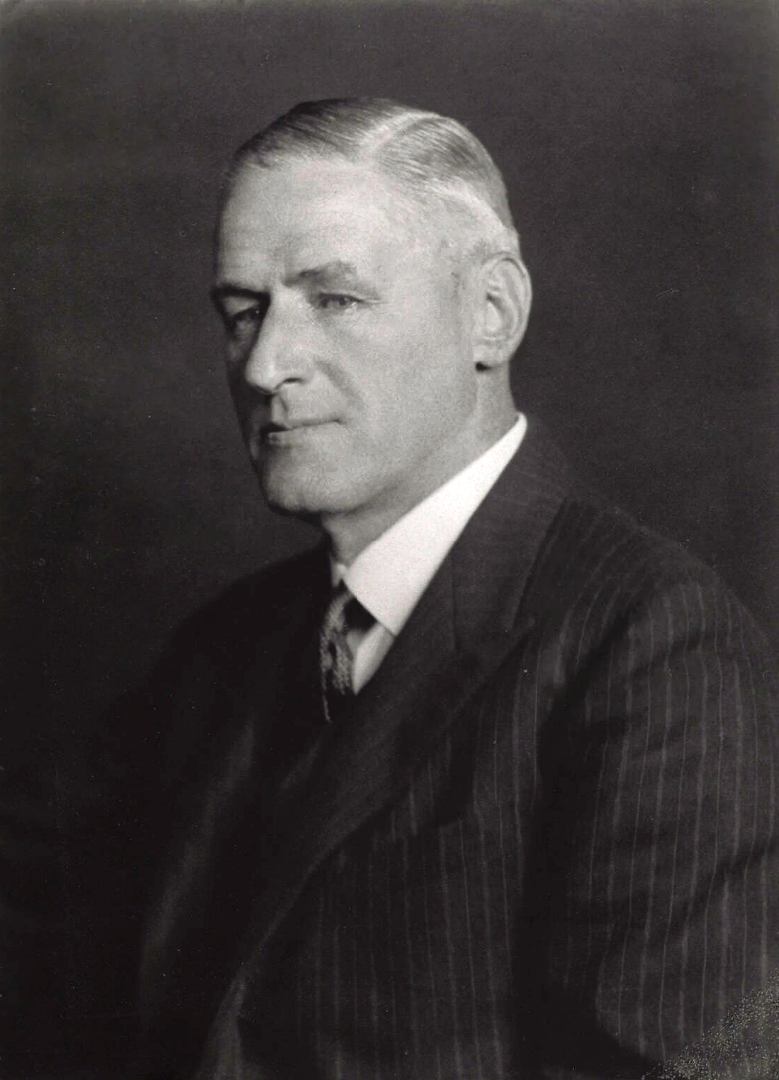

12th Police Commissioner of Calcutta
- In office 1923–1931
- Preceded by: Sir Reginald Clarke
- Succeeded by: L. H. Colson

Colonial police officer (adviser) in Mandatory Palestine
- In office December 1937 – May 1939

Personal details
- Born: 5 October 1881 Derry, Ireland
- Died: 6 April 1946 (aged 64)
- Profession: Police officer

Sir Charles Augustus Tegart KCIE MVO KPM JP (5 October 1881 – 6 April 1946) was an Anglo-Irish police officer who served extensively in the British territories of India and Mandatory Palestine.

== Early life ==
Born in Derry on 5 October 1881, Tegart was the son of a Church of Ireland clergyman, Rev. Joseph Poulter Tegart of Dunboyne, County Meath, and his wife Georgina Johnston. He was educated at Portora Royal School, Enniskillen and briefly at Trinity College, Dublin. He retained contacts there and was awarded an honorary doctorate in 1933. After his role in India, he served as chief assistant to Ormonde Winter, the head of British Intelligence operations in Ireland during the Irish War of Independence. Tegart began his career as an Assistant Superintendent of Police in Patna. In 1906, he was transferred to Calcutta, initially serving as Acting Deputy Commissioner. By 1913, he had been appointed Deputy Commissioner in the Political Branch of the Bengal Criminal Investigation Department (CID), which had recently been renamed the Intelligence Branch. During the First World War, he was granted a commission in the Army Service Corps in 1917; however, he was soon recalled to India to provide testimony before the Rowlatt Committee, which was investigating revolutionary activities in India.

Later in 1917, Tegart was appointed a Companion of the Order of the Indian Empire (CIE) and subsequently joined the Royal Flying Corps in France. He remained with the Army of Occupation for nearly a year before being seconded to Britain for special intelligence assignments. In 1923, he was appointed Police commissioner in Bengal, a position he held until 15 December 1931. Following his retirement from active police service, he served on the Council of the Secretary of State for India until 1937. In the Coronation Honours of May 1937, he was appointed a Knight Commander of the British Empire.

== Career in India ==
He joined the Calcutta Police in 1901, eventually becoming head of its Detective Department.

He was the first officer of the Indian Imperial Police (IMP) in the council and on his report its Special Branch was created. Tegart declined the formal appointment as Inspector General of Police in Palestine but agreed to collaborate in an advisory capacity with Sir David Petrie. During his time there, he undertook a major reorganization of the Criminal Investigation Department (CID) and played a key role in establishing the Rural Mounted Police force. He also oversaw the construction of a fortified barrier system along the Palestine frontier, which included a barbed-wire fence equipped with an electrified detection wire and reinforced by concrete pillboxes at strategic locations. These fortifications came to be known as the "Tegart Wall" and the "Tegart Forts."

He was awarded the King's Police Medal in 1911. He became Superintendent of Police in 1908, Deputy Commissioner in 1913, Deputy-Inspector General (Intelligence) in 1918, and Commissioner of Calcutta Police from 1923 to 1931.

Charles Tegart tried to suppress the nationalists of India such as Jatindranath Mukherjee at Balasore in Orissa (now Odisha), on 9 September 1915.

He was appointed a member of the Secretary of State's Indian Council in December 1931.

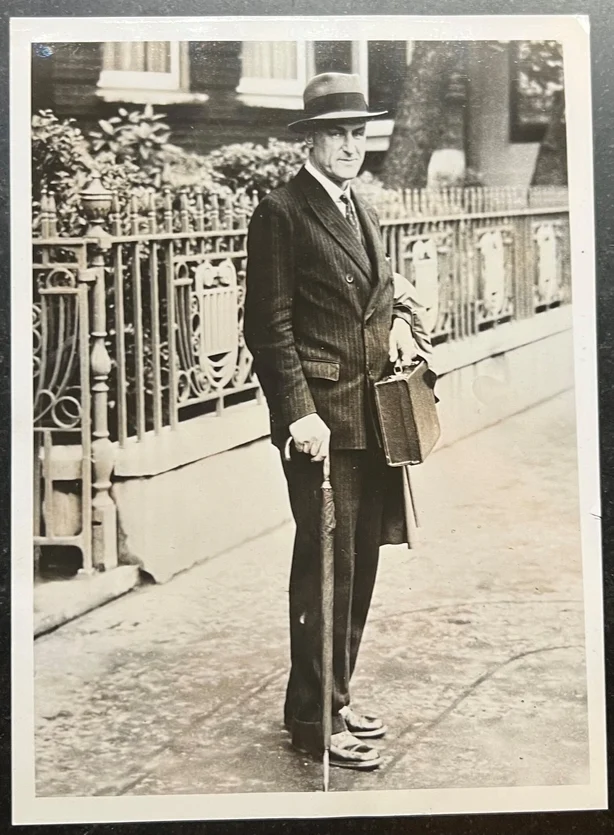
Sir Charles Augustus Tegart

== Career in Palestine ==
In view of his expertise, the British authorities sent him to the British Mandate of Palestine, then in the throes of the Arab Revolt, to advise the Inspector General on matters of security. He arrived there in December 1937.

In due course, he recommended the construction of 77 reinforced concrete police stations and a frontier fence along the northern border of Palestine to control the movement of insurgents, goods, and weapons. His advice was accepted and 62 new "Tegart forts", as they came to be known, were built throughout Palestine, however all but a few located along the Lebanese border were built after the Arab Revolt, in 1940–41. Many of them are still in use, although some were destroyed in various rounds of fighting.

Tegart is also said to have been behind the establishment of Arab Investigation Centres where suspected Arab insurgents were interrogated and sometimes tortured. Tactics included the Turkish practice of falaka (beating prisoners on the soles of their feet), though some historians have claimed that there is no conclusive proof that he personally oversaw these centres or sanctioned the use of torture.

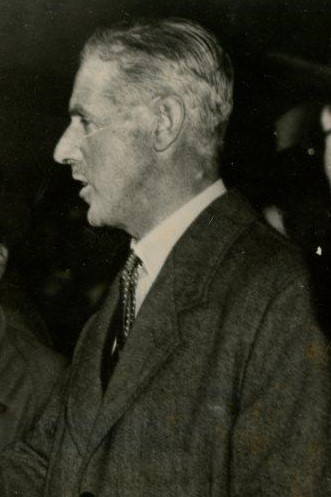
Charles Tegart

== World War II ==
In 1942, Tegart headed operations at the Ministry of Food in wartime Britain to combat the black market.

After returning to Britain, Tegart made a personal appeal to the Irish public to support the British war effort during the Second World War. He subsequently joined the Ministry of Supply, working alongside Sir John Nixon. During the war, he also led the Ministry of Food’s anti–black market campaign. Appalled by the widespread corruption he encountered, he established an intelligence bureau to investigate major cases of food-related fraud. Tegart personally selected his staff, which included Lionel Colson, and focused the bureau’s efforts on dismantling large-scale conspiracies that were undermining the nation’s food security.

In the weeks following Victory in Europe (VE) Day, Tegart went on sick leave after suffering the first in a series of heart attacks. Despite continuing health issues, he remained optimistic about his recovery. He formally resigned two months before his death, stating that the bureau required active leadership and could not be left without a head.

== Media ==
Tegart has been portrayed numerous times in film and television. Tegart appears as one of the primary antagonists in the Amazon Prime web series The Revolutionaries in which he is played by Australian actor Ed Robinson. He was portrayed by Irish actor Liam Cunningham in the 2025 film Palestine 36, and by Carl A Harte in the 2023 Bengali language film Bagha Jatin.

== See also ==
- Arab Investigation Centres, built under the direction of Charles Tegart
- Cellular Jail
- Bagha Jatin, comments by Tegart on his death
- Herbert Dowbiggin, British colonial policeman

Police appointments
Preceded by Sir Reginald Clarke	Police Commissioner of Calcutta; 1923–1931	Succeeded by L. H. Colson
