= Mactaggart baronets =

Baronetcy in the Baronetage of the United Kingdom

- Escutcheon of the Mactaggart baronets of King's Park
- Creation date: 1938
- Status: extant
- Motto: For commonwealth and liberty

The Mactaggart Baronetcy, of King's Park in the City of Glasgow, is a title in the Baronetage of the United Kingdom. It was created on 2 February 1938 for John Mactaggart. He was a housing expert and the co-founder of the building firm Mactaggart & Mickel. The second Baronet was managing director of Mactaggart & Mickel. The third Baronet was chairman of the Society for Individual Freedom.

== Mactaggart baronets, of King's Park (1938) ==
- Sir John Mactaggart, 1st Baronet (1867–1956)
- Sir John Auld Mactaggart, 2nd Baronet (1898–1960)
- Sir Ian Auld Mactaggart, 3rd Baronet (1923–1987)
- Sir John Auld Mactaggart, 4th Baronet (born 1951)

The heir apparent is the present holder's son John Auld Mactaggart (born 1993).

== See also ==
- Fiona Mactaggart, former MP, daughter of 3rd baronet / sister of 4th
