= Tegart's Wall =

Border fence in the Upper Galilee during the British Mandate of Palestine

Coordinates: 33.1153°N 35.5561°E

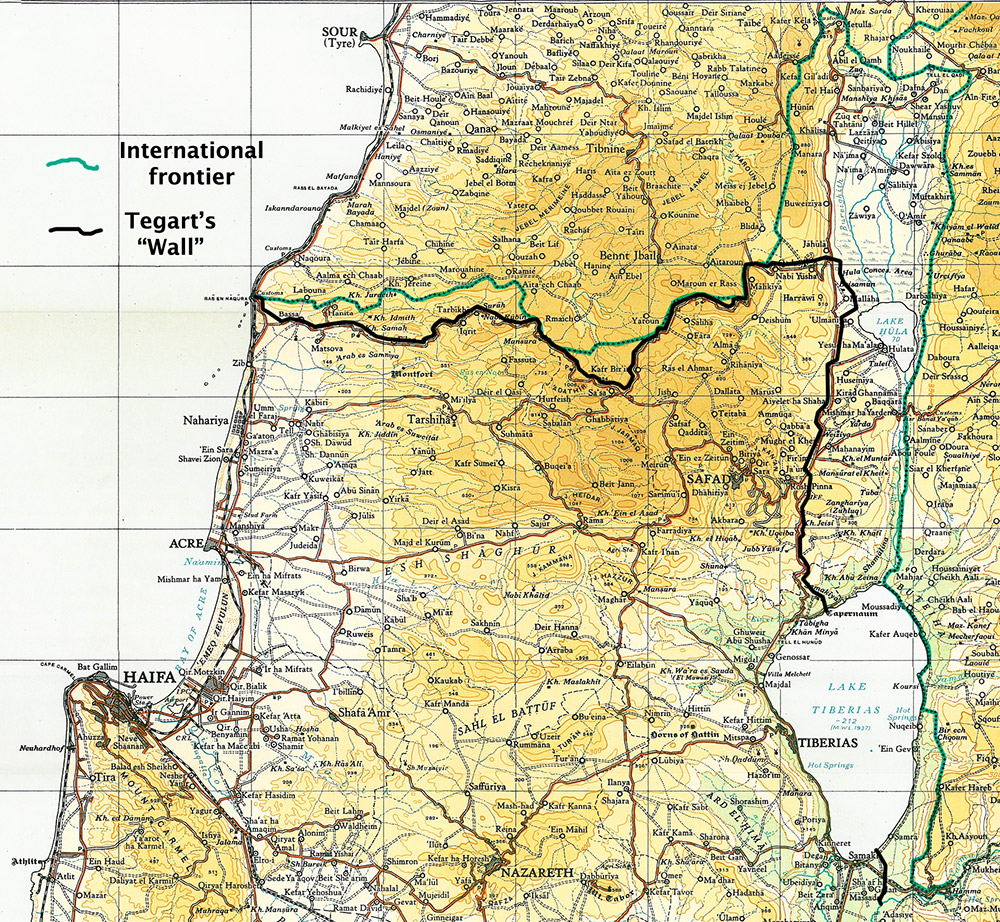
"Tegart's Wall", Palestine 1938–1940

Tegart's Wall was a barbed wire fence erected in May–June 1938 by British Mandatory authorities in the Upper Galilee near the northern border of the territory in order to keep militants from infiltrating from French-controlled Mandate for Syria and the Lebanon to join the 1936–1939 Arab revolt in Palestine. With time, the security system further included police forts, smaller pillbox-type fortified positions, and mounted police squads patrolling along it. It was described as an "ingenious solution for handling terrorism in Mandatory Palestine."

== History ==
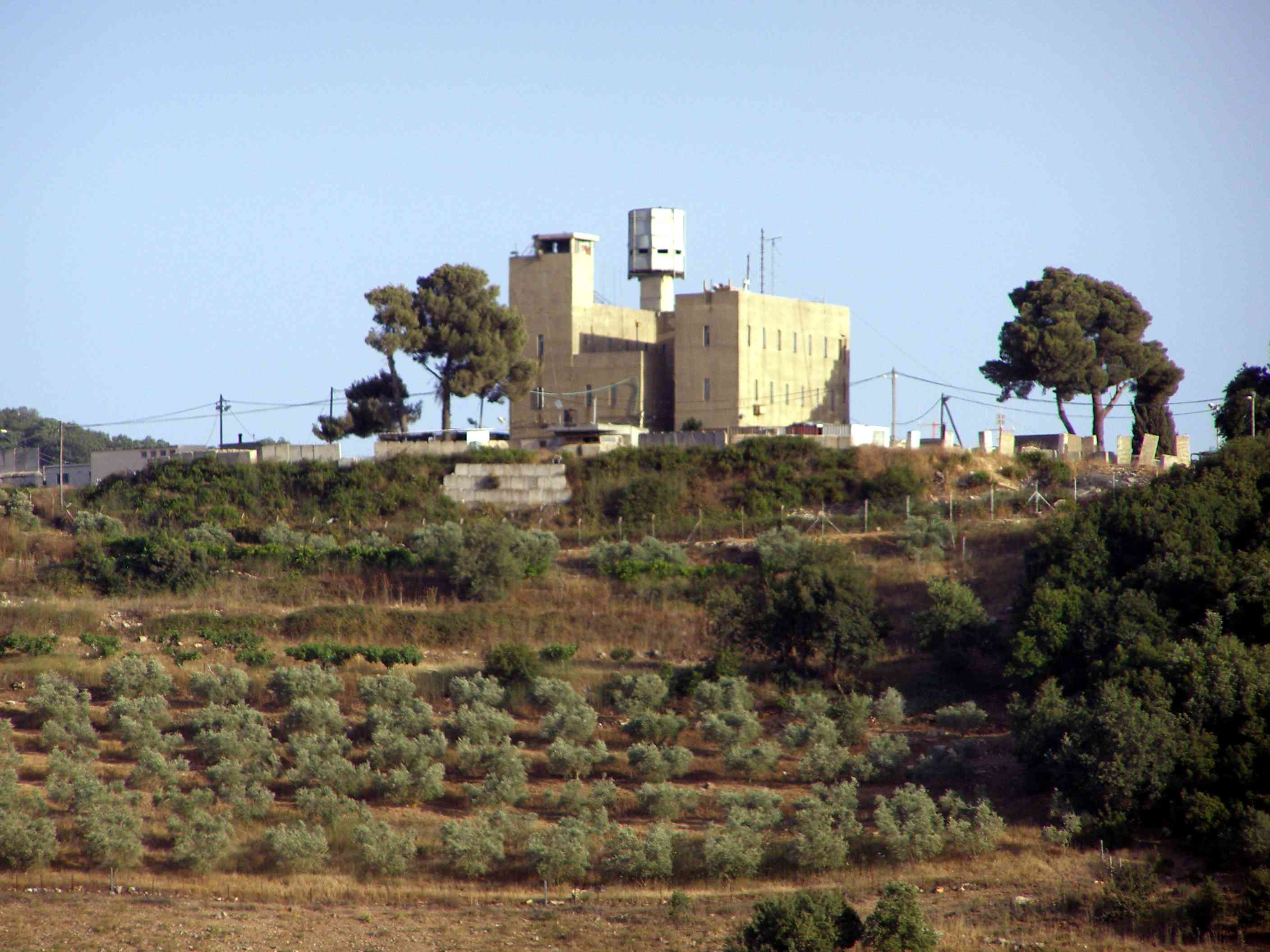
Tegart fort at Kibbutz Sasa

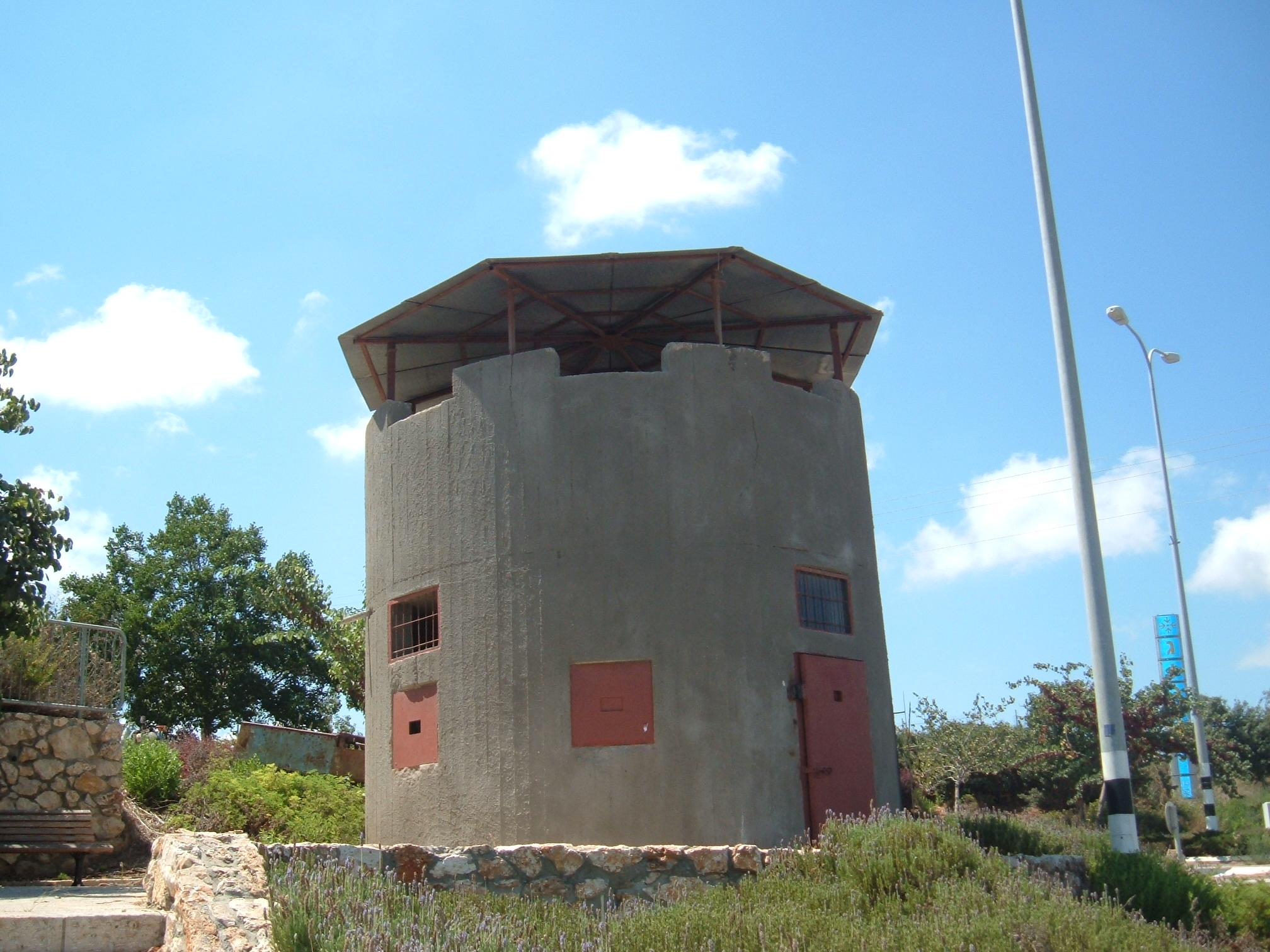
Pillbox built along the route of Tegart's Wall, still standing today near Goren industrial zone, northern Israel

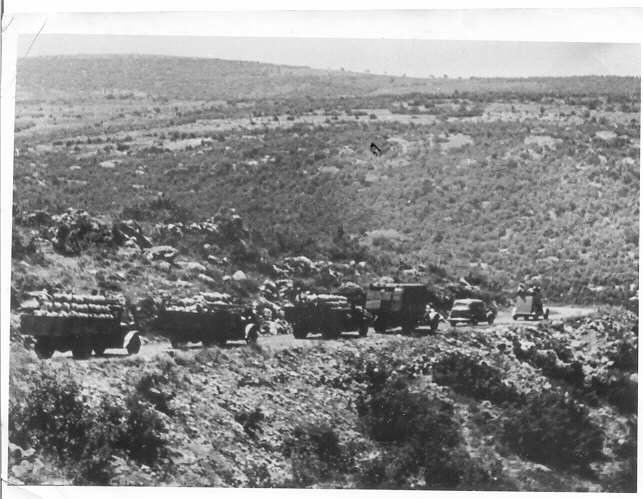
Workers building Tegart's Wall, 1938

The wall was built on the advice of Charles Tegart, adviser to the Palestine Government on the suppression of terrorism. Tegart had been based in Calcutta, India, and had rose to become commissioner of the city's police, where he was known for his expertise in addressing British governmental challenges with the local population. The "wall" was designed by Tegart to "prevent the bands fleeing from justice, smuggling arms, or entering for terrorism and agitation" entering from the French Mandate and Transjordan. In his first report, Tegart wrote that the border could not be defended along most of its length under the prevailing topographical conditions. The barrier was strung from An-Naqoura on the coast of the Mediterranean Sea to the north edge of Lake Tiberias at a cost of $450,000 (equivalent to $10,300,000 in 2025). It included a 9-foot (2.7 m) barbed wire fence that roughly followed the border between Palestine and French Mandatory Lebanon, but the Galilee panhandle was left on the outside. Before the fence was completed, "a band of Arab terrorists swooped down on a section of the fence… ripped it up and carted it across the frontier into Lebanon."

Five Tegart forts and twenty pillboxes were built along the route of the fence. Nevertheless, the infiltrators easily overcame the fence and evaded mobile patrols along the frontier road.

The barrier, which impeded both legal and illegal trade, angered local inhabitants on both sides of the border because it bisected pastures and private property. After the rebellion was suppressed in 1939, the wall was dismantled.

== See also ==
- Separation barrier

== Bibliography ==
- Eshel, David, "The Israel-Lebanon Border Enigma" (PDF), IBRU, no. 2000–1 Winter, UK: DUR
