= General Staff of the Israel Defense Forces =

Supreme command of the Israel Defense Forces

- המטה הכללי של צה"ל
- Matkal emblem
- Founded: 1948–present
- Country: Israel
- Type: Supreme command
- Part of: Israel Defense Forces
- Headquarters: Rabin Camp, Tel Aviv
- Nickname: Matkal

Commanders
- Chief of the General Staff: Rav Aluf Eyal Zamir
- Deputy Chief of the General Staff: Aluf Tamir Yadai

Insignia
- Matkal Flag

The General Staff of the Israel Defense Forces or General Headquarters (Hebrew: המטה הכללי של צה"ל), abbreviated Matkal (מטכ"ל), is the supreme command of the Israel Defense Forces. It is based in the Kirya compound (Rabin Camp) in Tel Aviv.

== Members ==
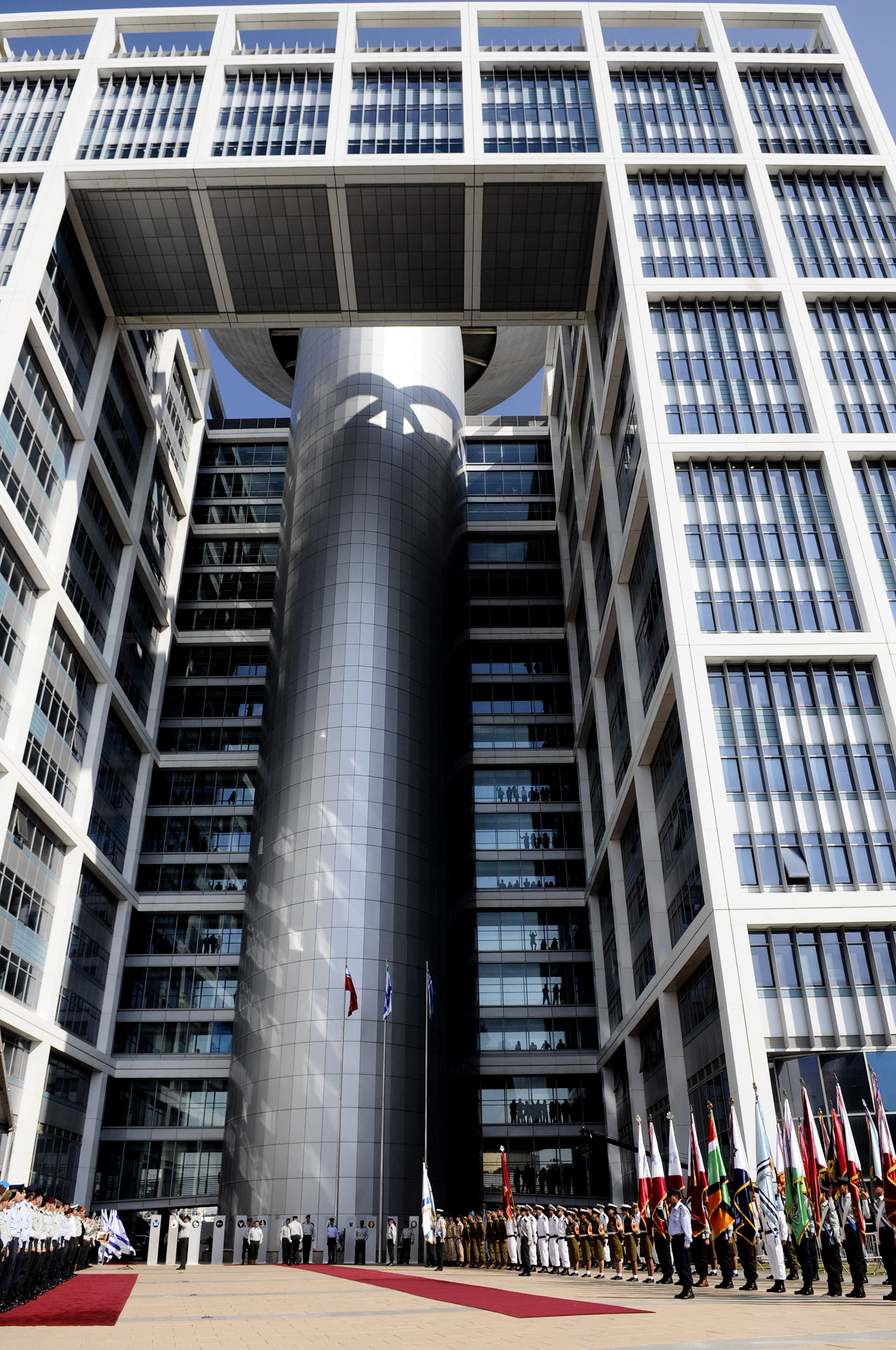
Honor guard at IDF headquarters for outgoing chief of staff Gabi Ashkenazi

The majority of members in the General Staff Forum are officers ranked as Aluf and heads of the following military and civilian bodies:

=== Chief ===
- Chief of the General Staff – Rav Aluf Eyal Zamir
- Deputy Chief of the General Staff – Aluf Tamir Yadai

=== Arms ===
- Commander of the Ground Forces – Aluf Nadav Lotan
- Commander of the Air Force – Aluf Omer Tischler
- Commander of the Navy – Aluf Eyal Harel

=== Directorates ===
- Head of the Operations Directorate – Aluf Itzik Cohen
- Head of the Military Intelligence Directorate – Aluf Shlomi Binder
- Head of the Technological and Logistics Directorate – Aluf Rami Abudarham
- Head of the Personnel Directorate – Aluf Dado Bar Kalifa
- Head of the Planning Directorate – Aluf Hidai Zilberman
- Head of the ICT and Cyber Defense Directorate – Aluf Aviad Dagan

=== Commands ===
- Commander of the Northern Command – Aluf Rafi Milo
- Commander of the Central Command – Aluf Avi Bluth
- Commander of the Southern Command – Aluf Yaniv Asor
- Commander of the Home Front Command – Aluf Shai Klepper

=== Other ===
- Military Secretary to the Prime Minister – Aluf Guy Markizano
- Military Secretary to the Minister of Defense – Tat-Aluf Hisham Ibrahim
- Military Secretary to the President – Tat-Aluf Gil Elya
- Commander of the Military Colleges – Aluf Dan Neumann
- Commander of the Depth Corps – Aluf Dan Goldfuss
- Coordinator of Government Activities in the Territories – Aluf Yoram HaLevi
- Commander of the Northern Corps – Aluf Yaki Dolf
- President of the Military Court of Appeals – Aluf Orli Markman
- Military Advocate General – Aluf Itay Offir
- IDF Spokesperson – Tat-Aluf Effie Defrin
- The Financial Advisor to the Chief of Staff – Tat-Aluf Nir Weingold
- Assistant to the Chief of Staff –Aluf-Mishne Alon Laniado

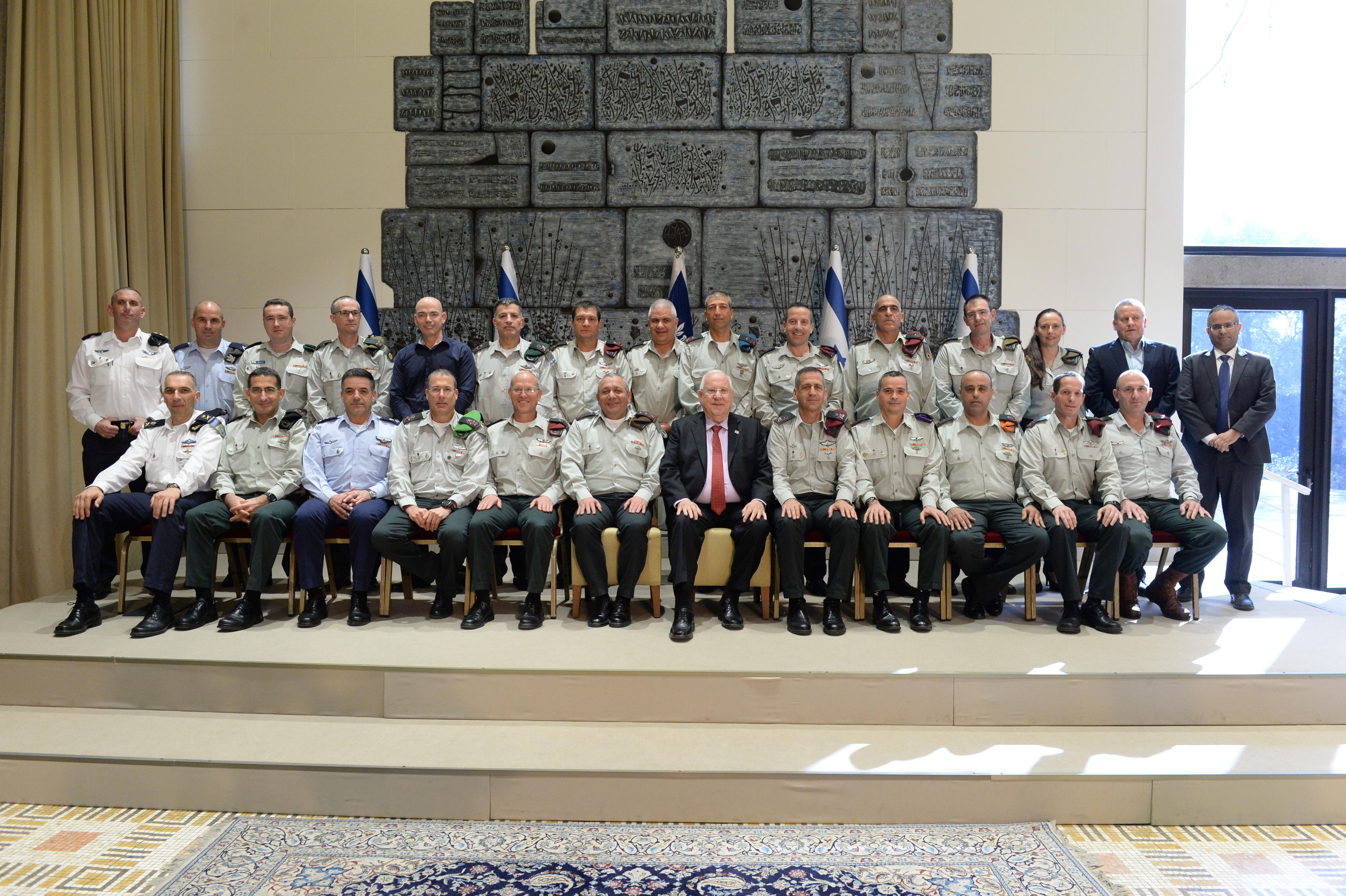
The matkal, hosted in Beit HaNassi by Israeli president Reuven Rivlin in 2018. In the background is an Israeli artwork made of basalt.

=== Civilian ===
- Director-general of the Ministry of Defense – Aluf (Res.) Amir Baram
- Defense Establishment Comptroller – Tat-Aluf (Res.) Yair Volansky
- IDF Internal Comptroller – Tat-Aluf (Res.) Ofer Sarig
- Head of Administration for the Development of Weapons and the Technological Industry – Tat-Aluf (Res.) Daniel (Danny) Gold
