= Egoz Unit =

Israel Defense Forces unit

Unit 621
- Yehidat Egoz
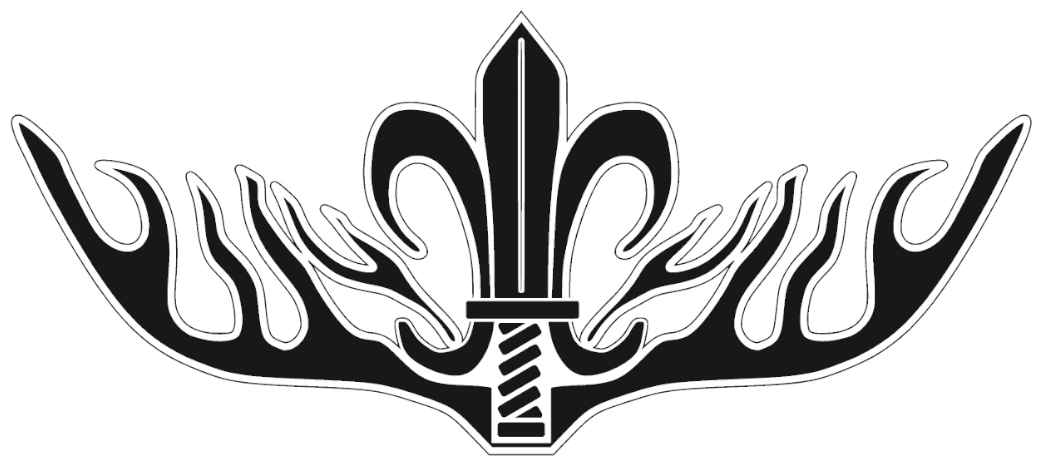
- Egoz Unit insignia
- Active: 1995–present
- Country: Israel
- Branch: Israeli Ground Forces
- Type: Special Forces
- Role: Anti-guerilla warfare Special reconnaissance Direct action
- Size: Battalion
- Part of: Central Command; 98th Division; 89th Brigade
- Engagements: South Lebanon conflict (1985–2000); Second Intifada; 2006 Lebanon War; Operation Protective Edge; Gaza war 2024 Israeli invasion of Lebanon

Commanders
- Current commander: Classified
- Notable commanders: Erez Zuckerman

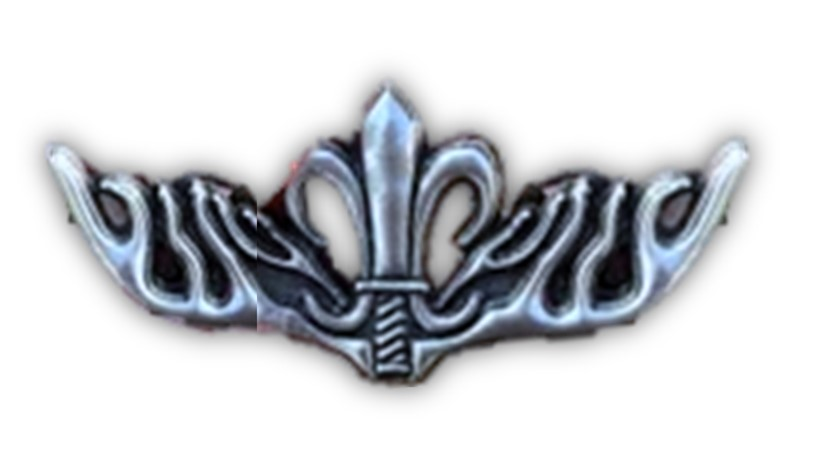
Egoz Unit combatant pin

The Egoz Unit (Hebrew: יחידת אגוז, romanized: Yehidat Egoz, lit. "Walnut Unit", Egoz being the acronym for "anti-guerrilla and small-scale warfare"), officially Unit 621, is an elite Israel Defense Forces (IDF) commando unit specializing in anti-guerrilla warfare, special reconnaissance, and direct action. It is a part of the IDF Central Command's 89th Brigade (commonly referred to as the commando brigade).

The unit specializes in combat in dense terrain, fieldcraft, camouflage, and guerrilla warfare—close-range fighting where the fighter's skill and professionalism are critical to success. The unit operates in all terrains and theaters, focusing mainly on the northern sector.

Egoz also has a unique ordnance platoon, tasked with developing creative solutions and technological innovations to address new challenges encountered on the battlefield and to provide defense against new methods of enemy attack.

The unit's memorial site, commemorating its various incarnations, is located at Nabi Hazuri in the northern Golan Heights.

In its first iteration, the unit was established in 1956 as Sayeret Egoz, a Northern Command reconnaissance unit, and operated until the end of the Yom Kippur War in 1974.

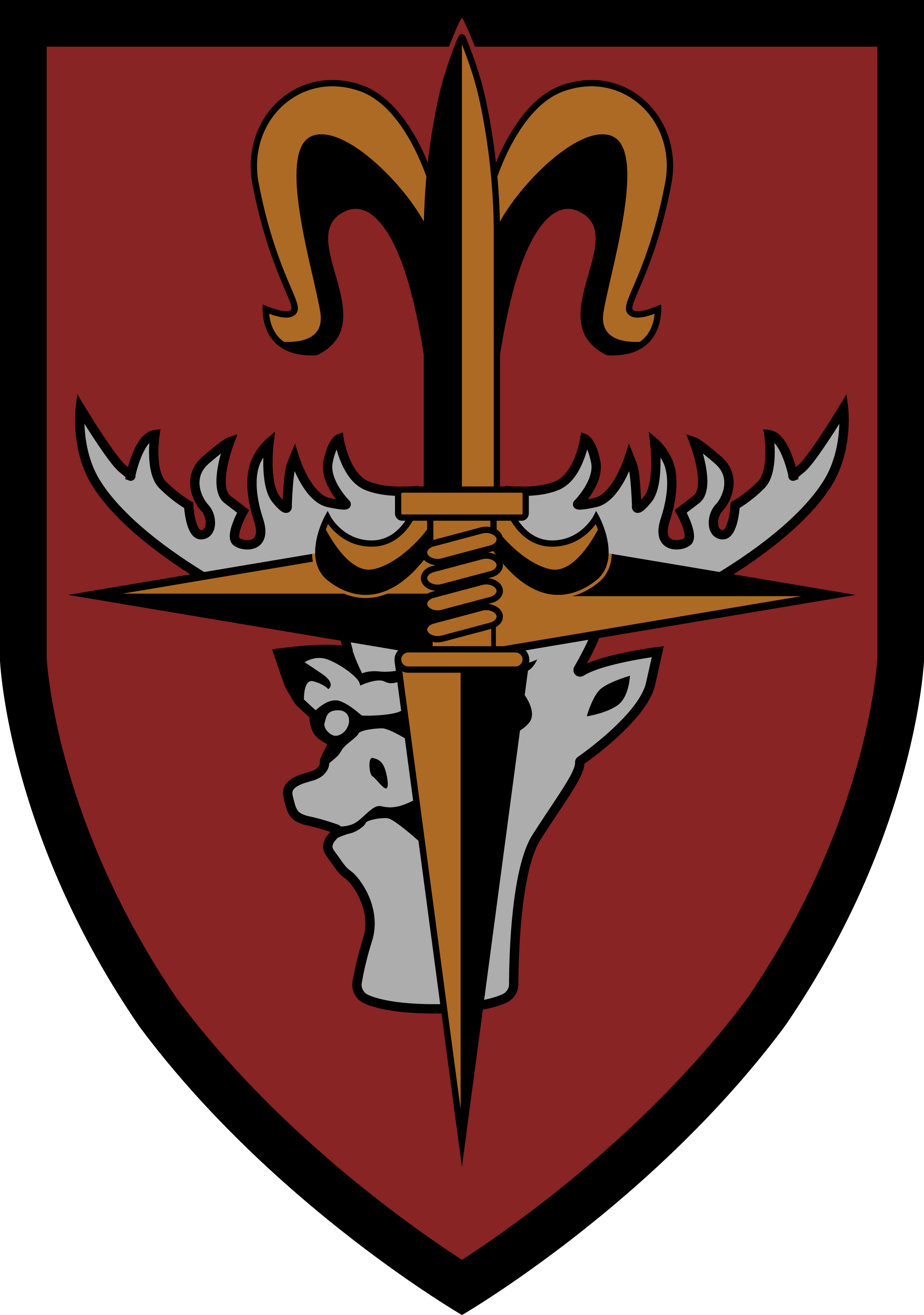
Sayeret Egoz insignia (1956–74)

== History ==
The current Egoz unit was formed in January 1995 from a team of Paratroopers Reconnaissance Unit soldiers, as part of the Golani Brigade. It was named after the original Sayeret Egoz unit that operated under Northern Command until 1974. The initiative to establish the unit was driven by then-Chief of Staff Amnon Lipkin-Shahak and Northern Command Commander Amiram Levin, who sought to revolutionize the fight against Hezbollah through new combat doctrines and tactics. The unit was attached to the Golani Brigade due to the claim by its commander, Moshe Kaplinsky, that the new unit required the support, mentorship, and logistics of an experienced unit, well-versed in combat in Lebanon.

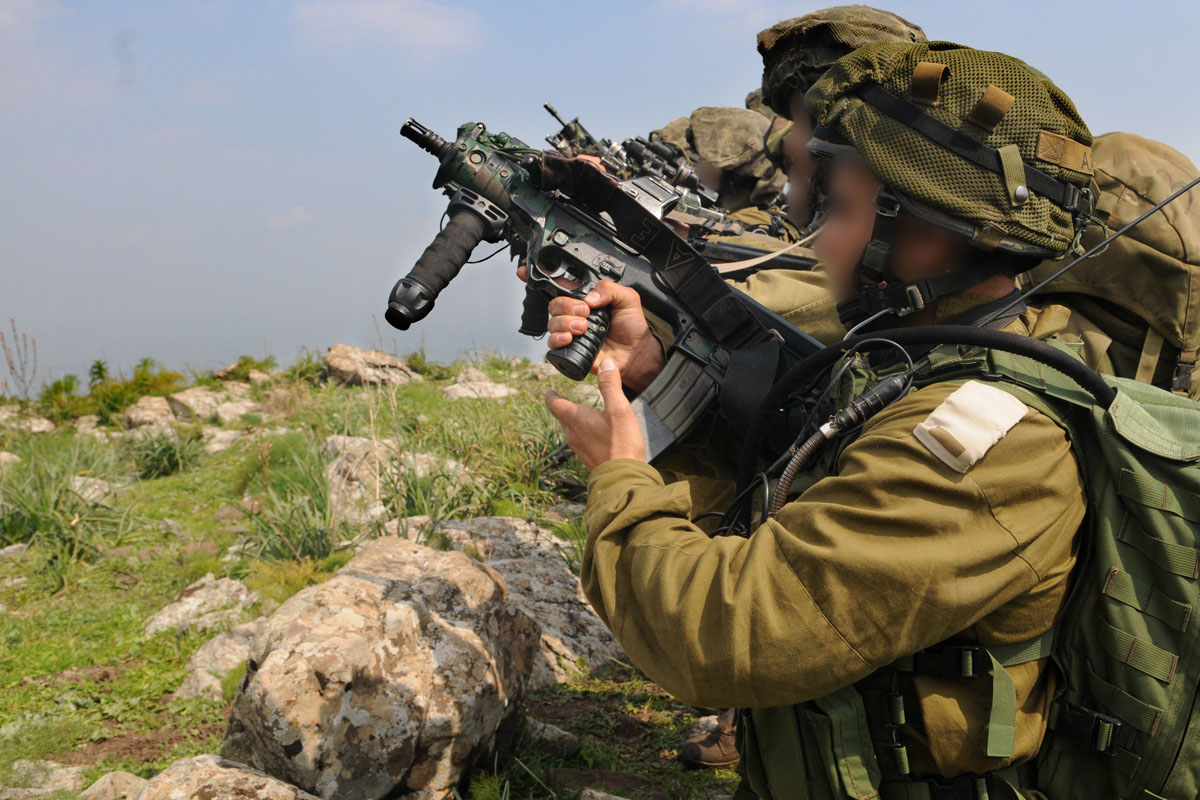
Egoz soldiers taking part in a live fire exercise.

Egoz was created as a guerrilla warfare unit specifically to fight Hezbollah in the Security Zone of southern Lebanon. Its first commander was Erez Zuckerman, a former member of Shayetet 13, who led the unit through most of its initial operations. Within six months of its establishment, the unit had already achieved notable successes, including its first operation, during which it killed two Hezbollah militants near the Hula outpost.

In 1997, Moshe (Chico) Tamir from the Golani Brigade took command of the unit. His tenure was marked by determined fighting against Hezbollah. One of the most notable operations during his command was Operation Wild Nature in September 1997, where the unit killed Hadi Nasrallah, the son of Hezbollah's Secretary-General Hassan Nasrallah. The bodies of the militants were later returned to Lebanon in exchange for the remains of Shayetet 13 commando Itamar Eliyahu, who had been killed in the Shayetet Disaster. Another significant operation during this time was Operation Brilliant Move, in which Tamir led the unit in a mission in Lebanon against a Hezbollah security squad in the village of Aindouriyah, killing eight militants.

=== 2000s ===
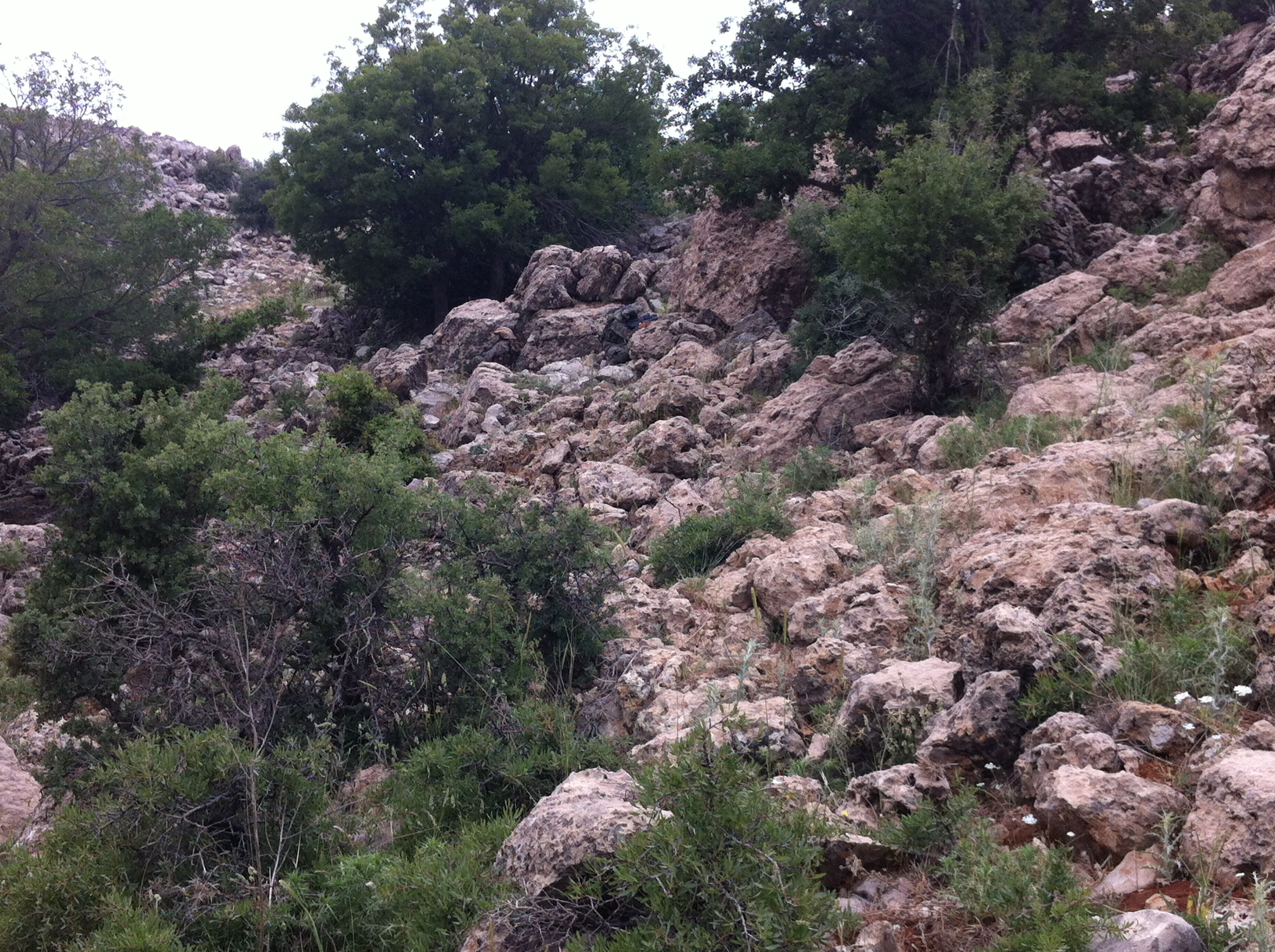
Operators from Egoz are experts in camouflage, which helps them blend into the landscape.

Following Israel's withdrawal from Lebanon in 2000, the unit continued its operations along the northern border, while also becoming involved in counter-terrorism operations in the West Bank and the Gaza Strip. Under the command of Tamir Yadai, Egoz participated in Operation Defensive Shield, including the Battle of Ramallah.

=== Second Lebanon War ===
On 20 July 2006, during the Second Lebanon War, five soldiers from Egoz were killed, and six others were wounded in a battle near the moshav of Avivim, while clearing Hezbollah bunkers in the village of Maroun al-Ras. According to IDF reports, about 20 Hezbollah militants were killed during the Battle of Maroun al-Ras.

Following the war, the unit conducted a series of offensive operations in the Gaza Strip, alongside the Golani Brigade and Givati Brigade. In one operation in January 2008, Egoz forces, supported by armor and air force units, killed 18 militants, including the son of senior Hamas leader Mahmoud al-Zahar. During Operation Protective Edge in 2014, the unit killed approximately 50 militants while fighting in the Shejaiya neighborhood. On the 14th day of the operation, the unit's commander, Lt. Col. Yonatan Rumm, was seriously injured by an anti-tank missile. His predecessor, Lt. Col. Pini Yosef, took over and led the unit in further combat operations.

=== Establishment of the Commando Brigade and after ===
On 24 December 2015, Egoz officially parted ways with the Golani Brigade, and on 27 December, it joined the newly formed Oz Brigade.

The unit participated in Operation Guardian of the Walls in Gaza, targeting dozens of anti-tank and rocket-launching sites and killing multiple militants.

In July 2023, Egoz took part in Operation House and Garden in the area of Jenin refugee camp, conducting offensive operations and dismantling terrorist infrastructure. During the operation, Egoz soldier Sgt. David Yehuda Yitzhak was killed in a firefight.

The unit has lost 17 soldiers since the start of the Gaza war (as of October 2024).

== Unit Commanders ==
Name	Term	Notes
Erez Zuckerman	1995–1997	Awarded Chief of Staff Citation, later commander of the Bashan Division
Moshe Tamir	1997–1998	Awarded Northern Command Citation, later commander of the Company Commanders and Battalion Commanders Course
Hagai Peleg	1998–1999	Awarded Northern Command Citation, later commander of the Yamam
Hagai Mordechai	1999–2000	Later Chief of Staff of the Ground Forces
Tamir Yadai	2000–2002	Later Commander of the Ground Forces
Avi Peled	2002–2003	Later IDF attaché to India
Ofek Buchris	2003–2004	Awarded Chief of Staff Citation, later commander of IDF Command and Staff College
Mordechai Kahana	2004–2006	Later Chief Intelligence Officer
Yaniv Assor	2006–2008	Later Chief of Personnel Directorate
David Zini	2008–2010	Later Commander of the General Staff Corps
Shlomi Binder	2010–2012	Later Chief of IDF Operations Branch

== Gallery ==
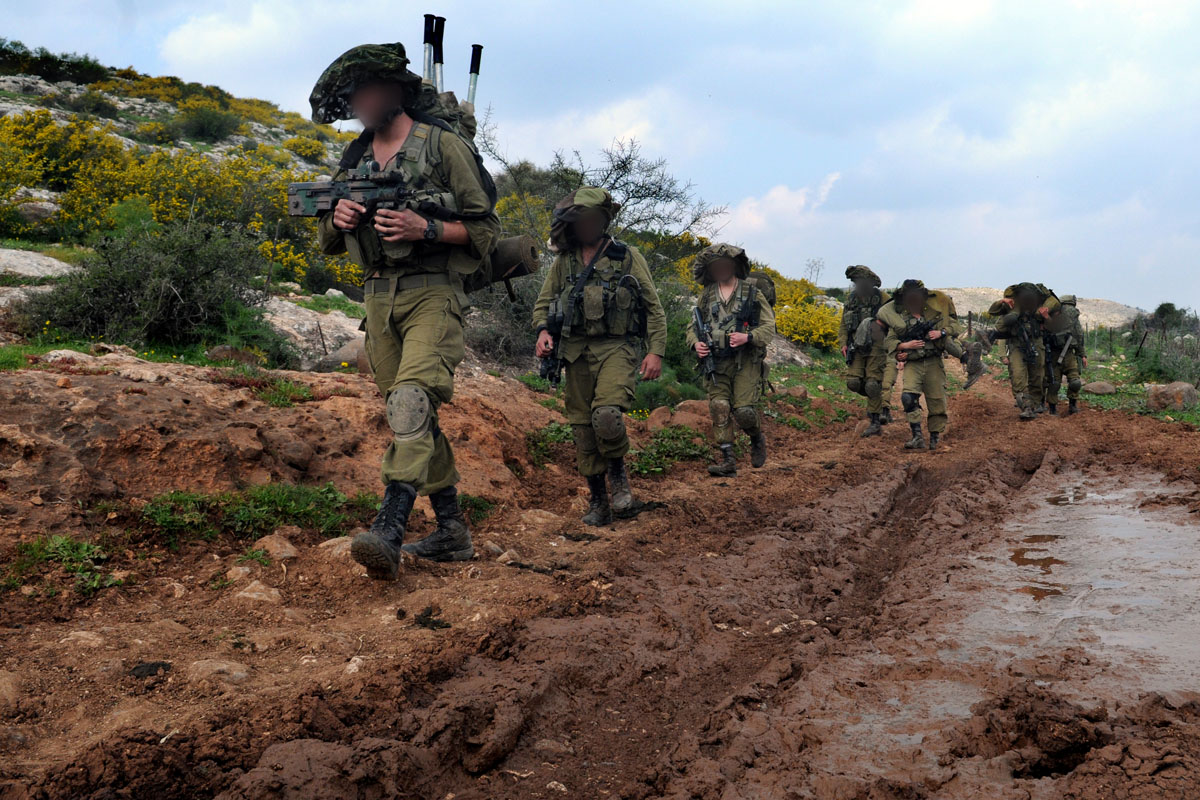
Egoz soldiers during final test

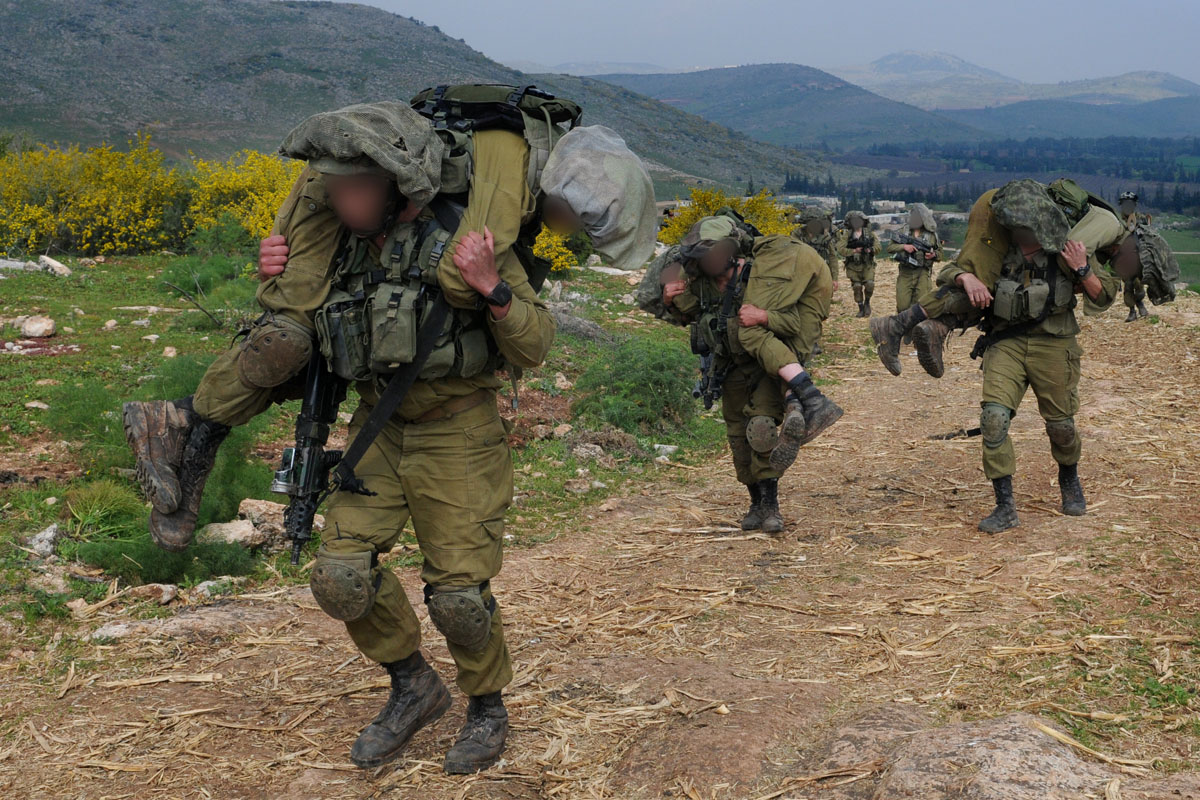
Egoz soldiers during a unit training

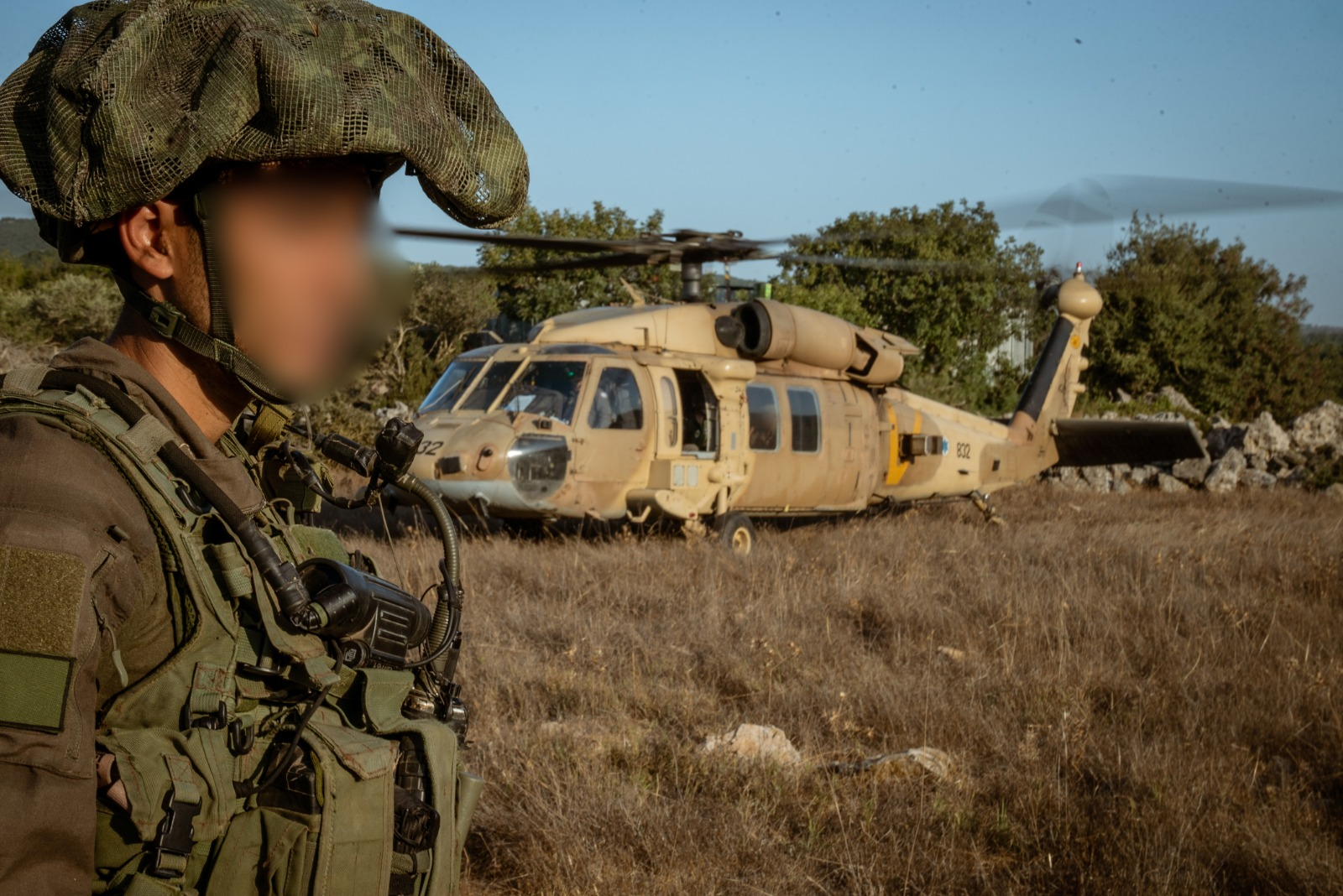
Egoz unit exercise with helicopters

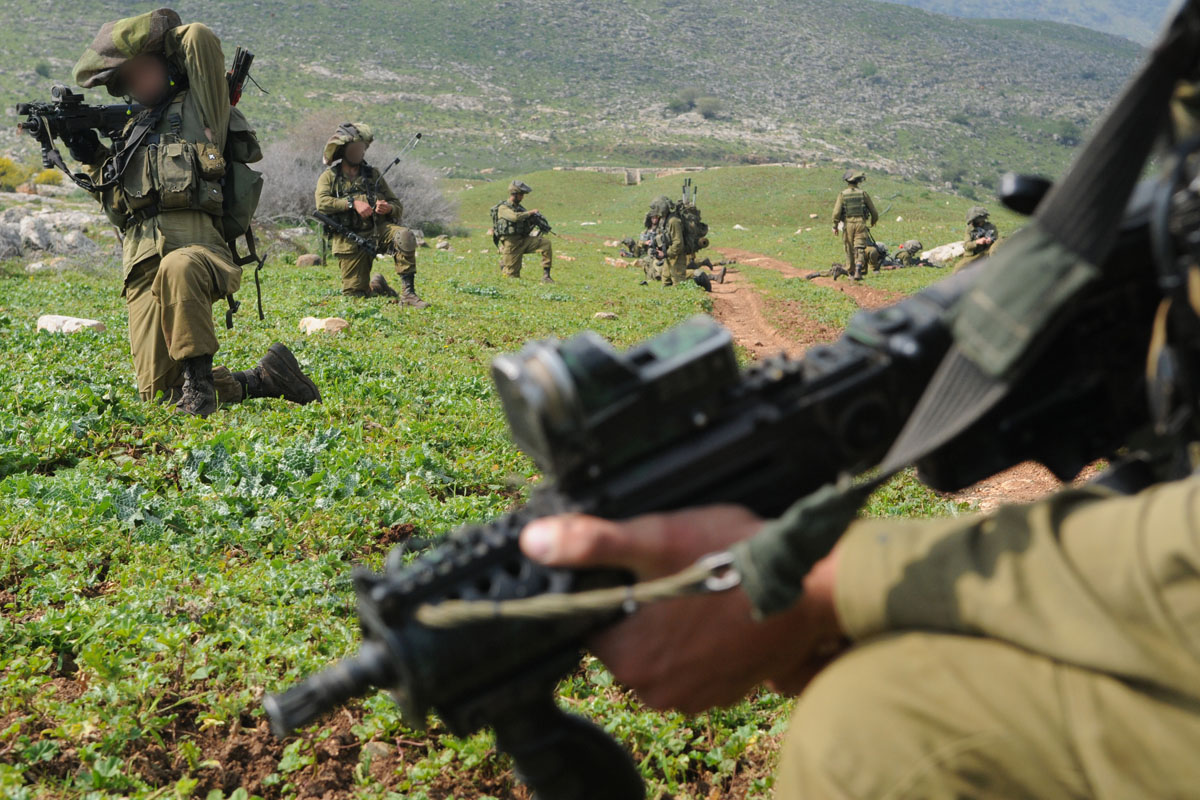
Egoz soldiers during a battalion training

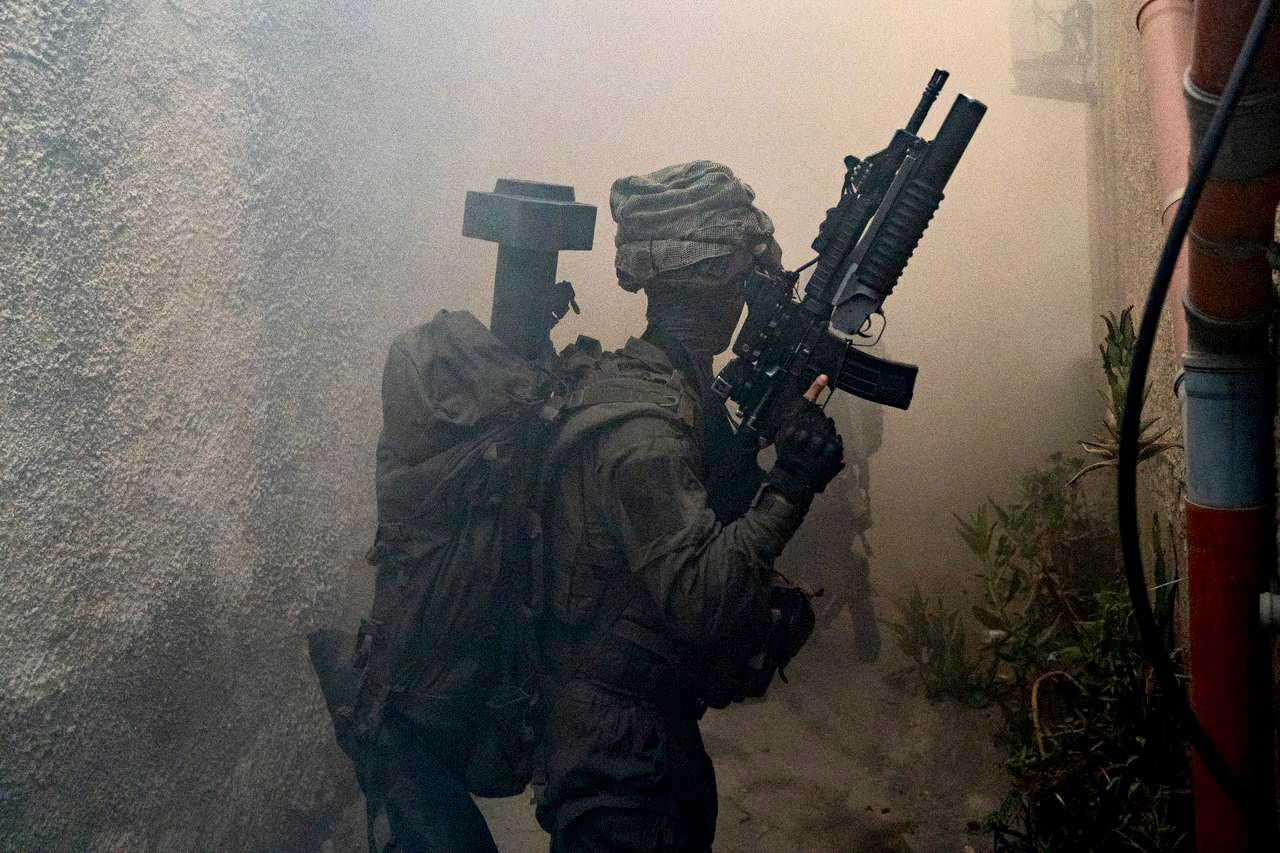
Egoz soldier during "Operation Beit V'Gan"

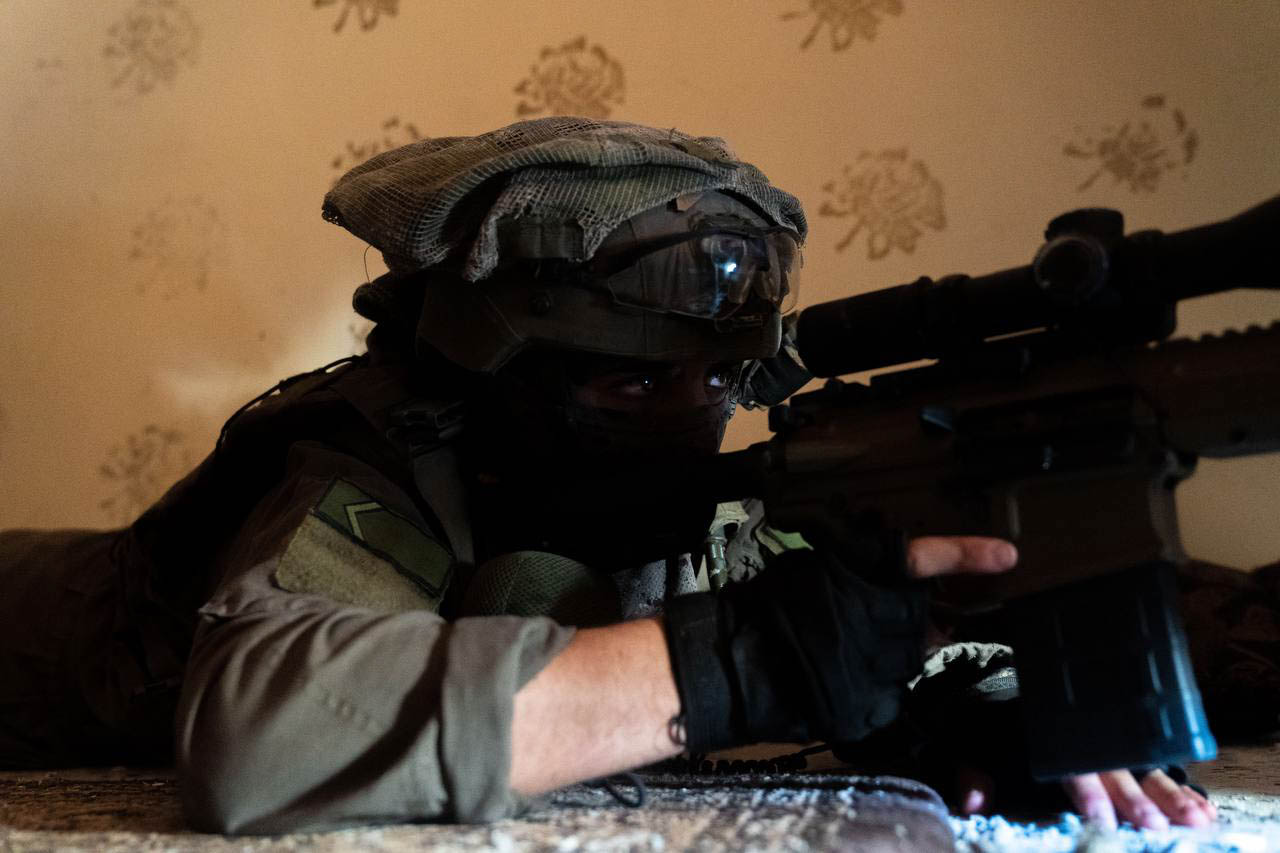
Egoz sniper during "Operation Beit V'Gan"

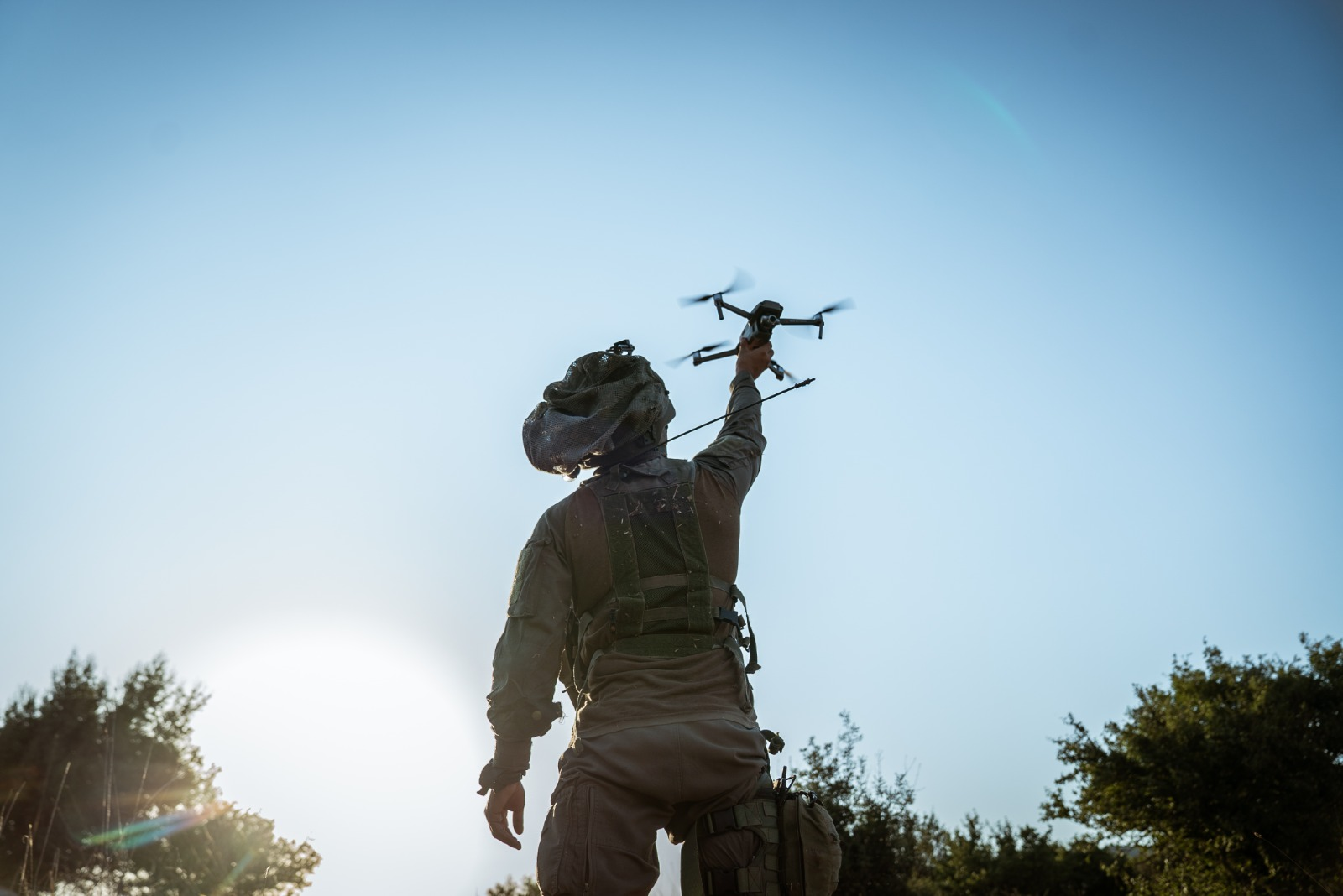
Egoz soldier operating a drone

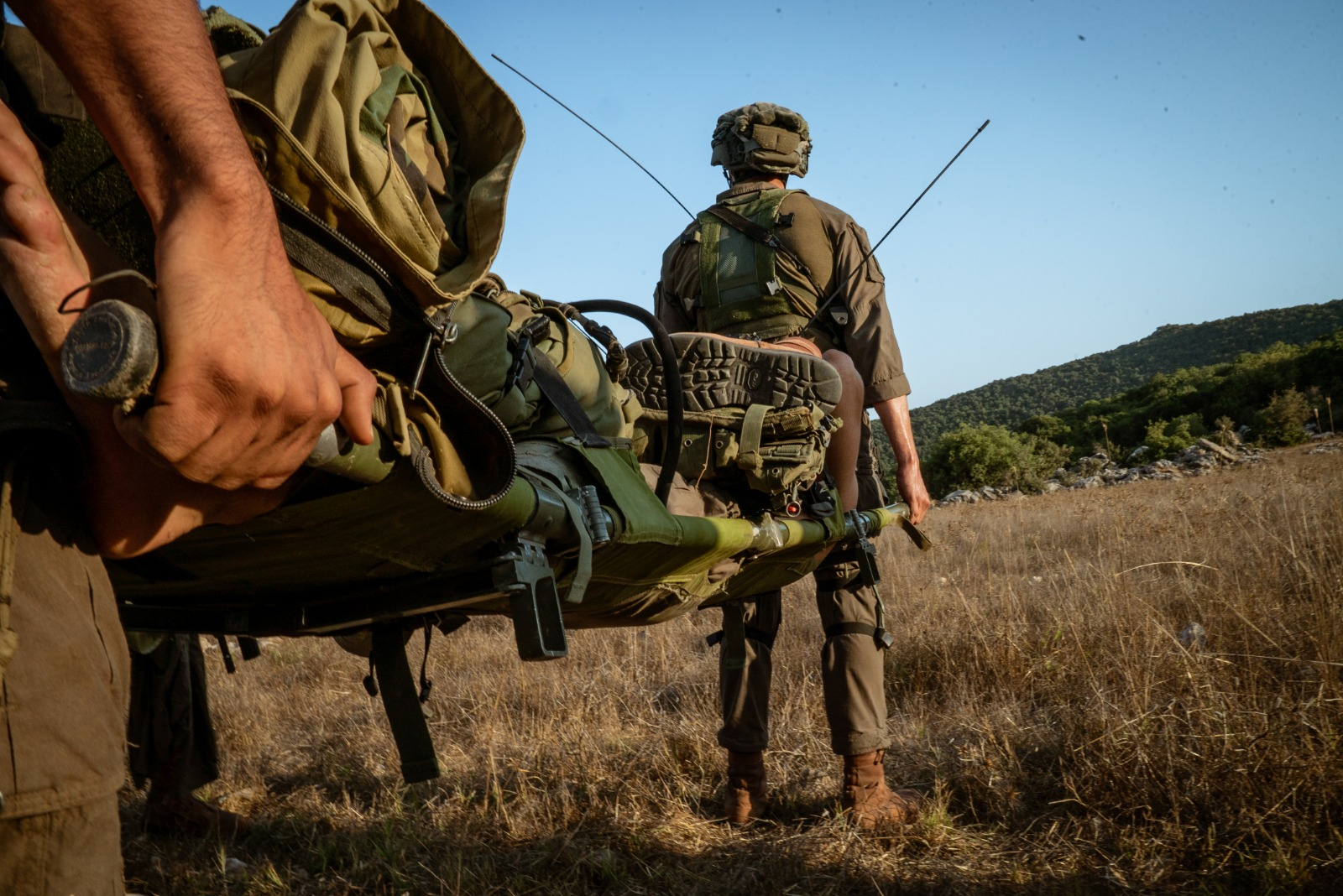
Egoz soldiers during an exercise

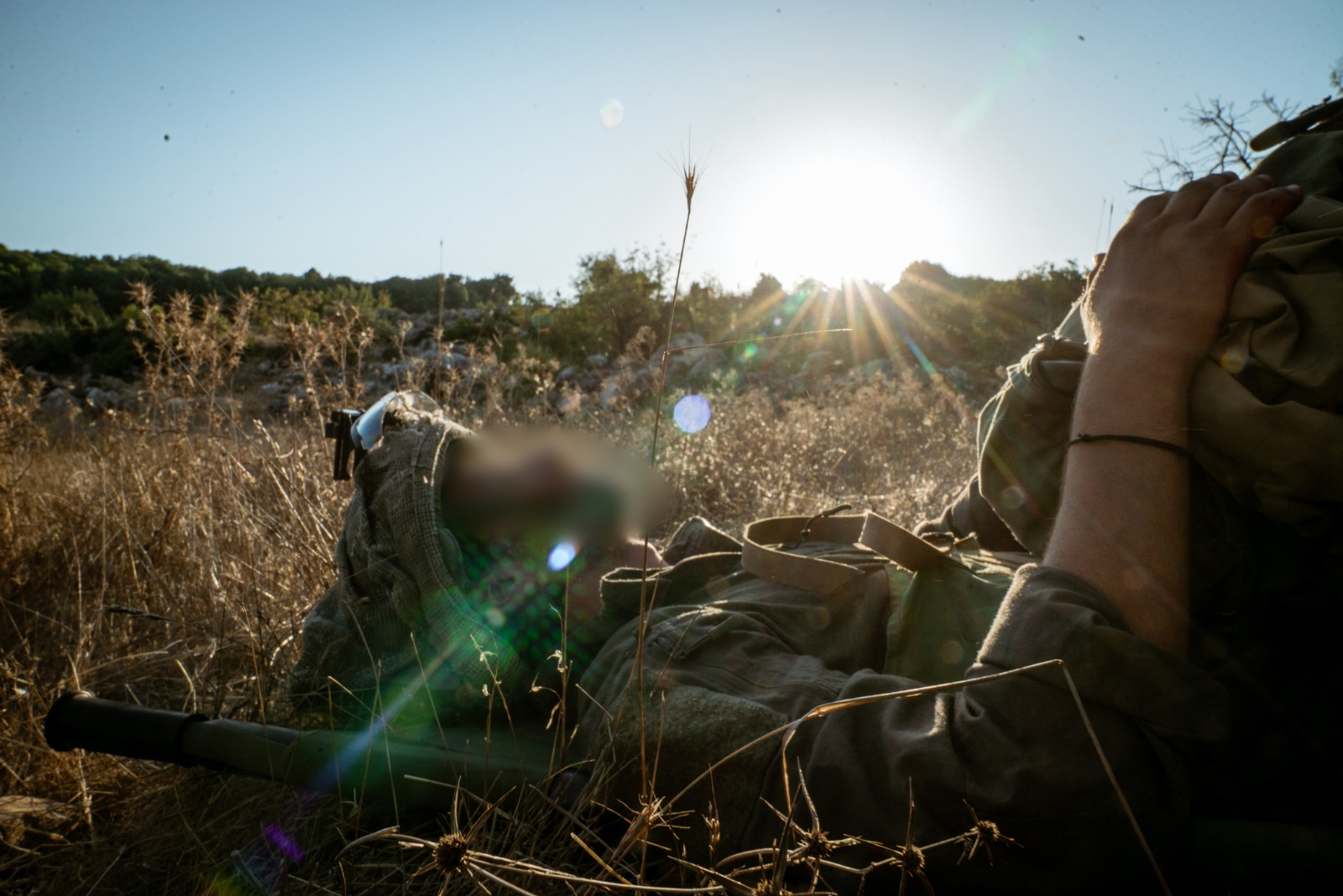
Egoz soldier during an exercise

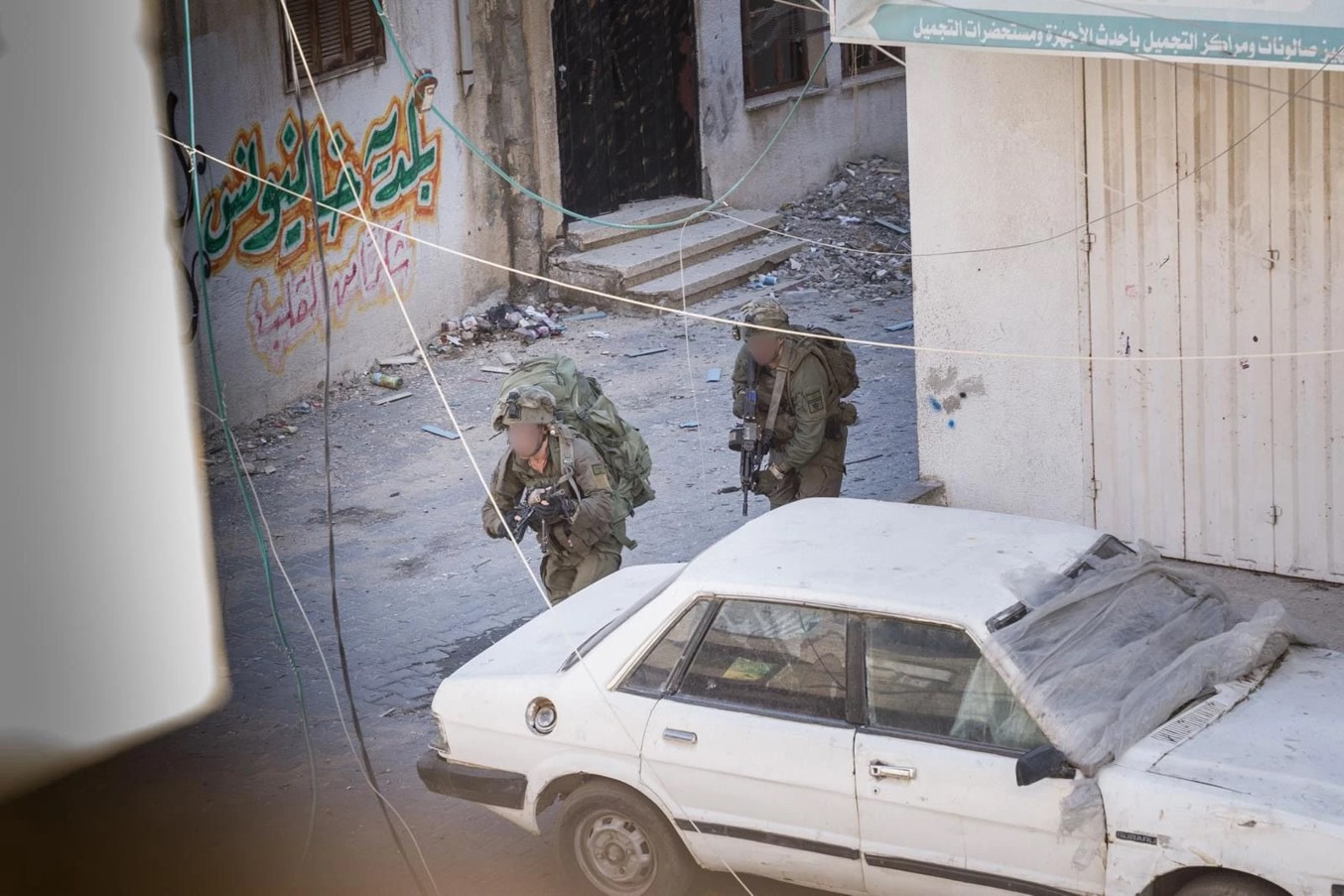
Egoz soldiers in Khan Yunis

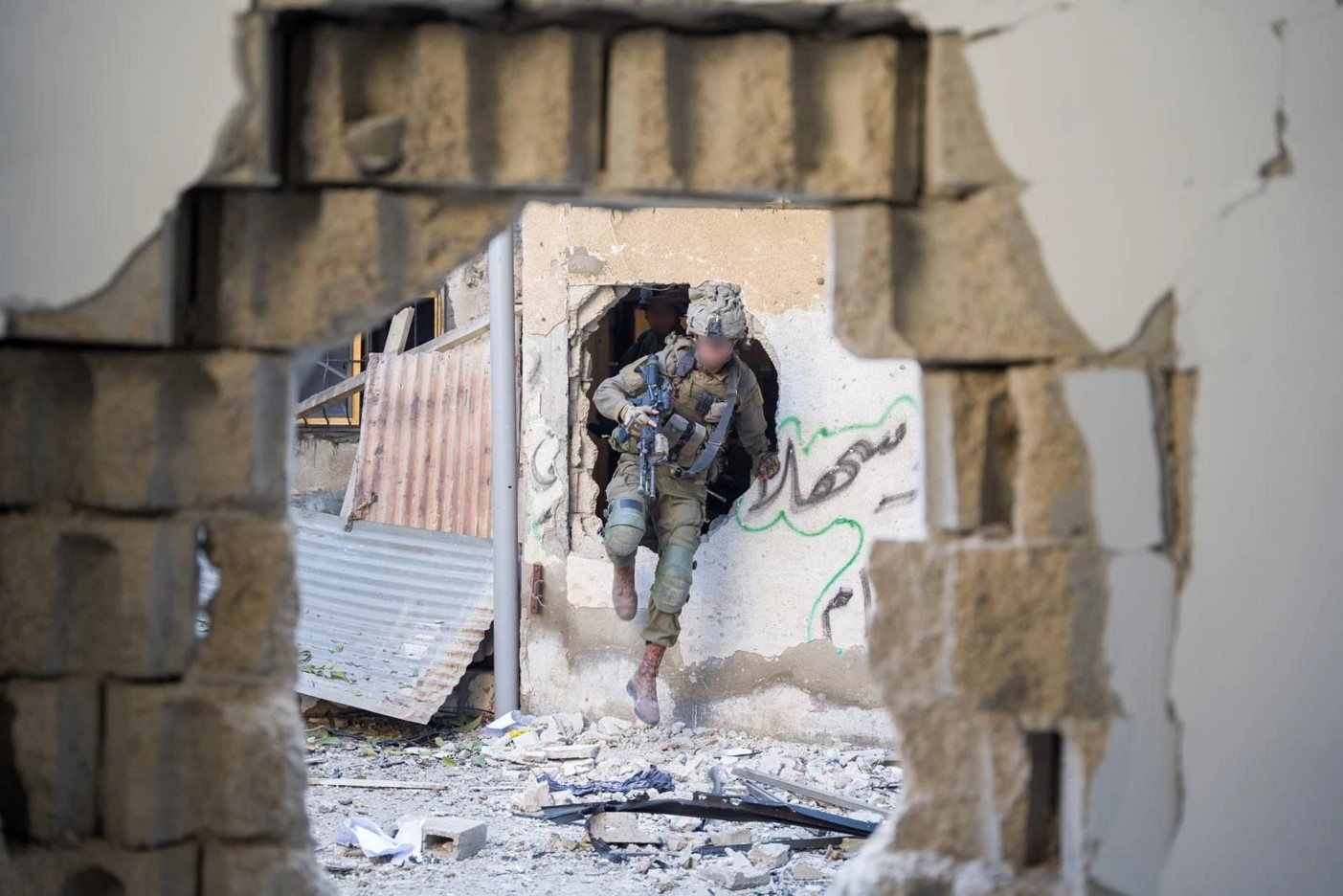
Egoz soldier in the streets of Khan Yunis

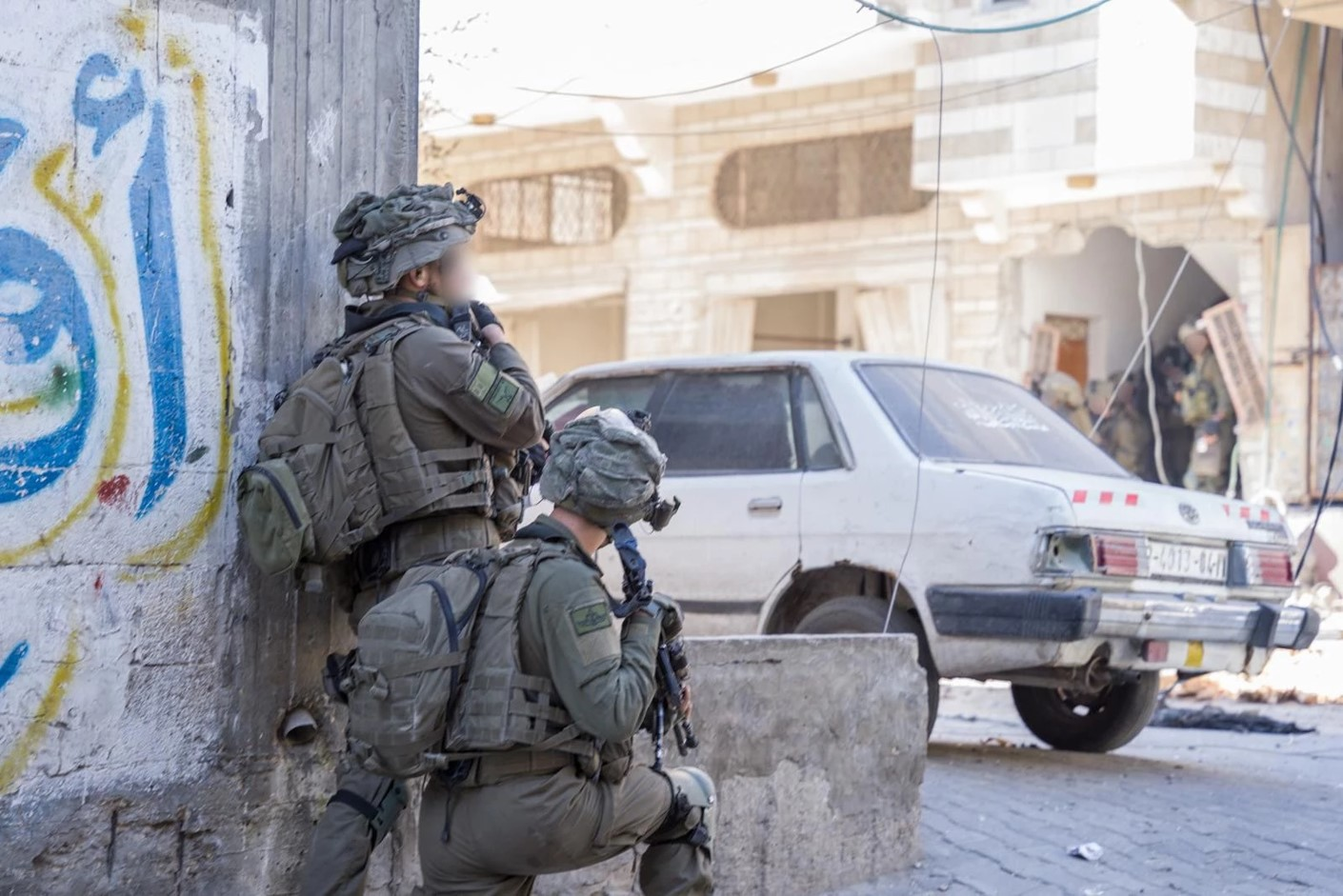
Egoz soldiers fighting in Khan Yunis

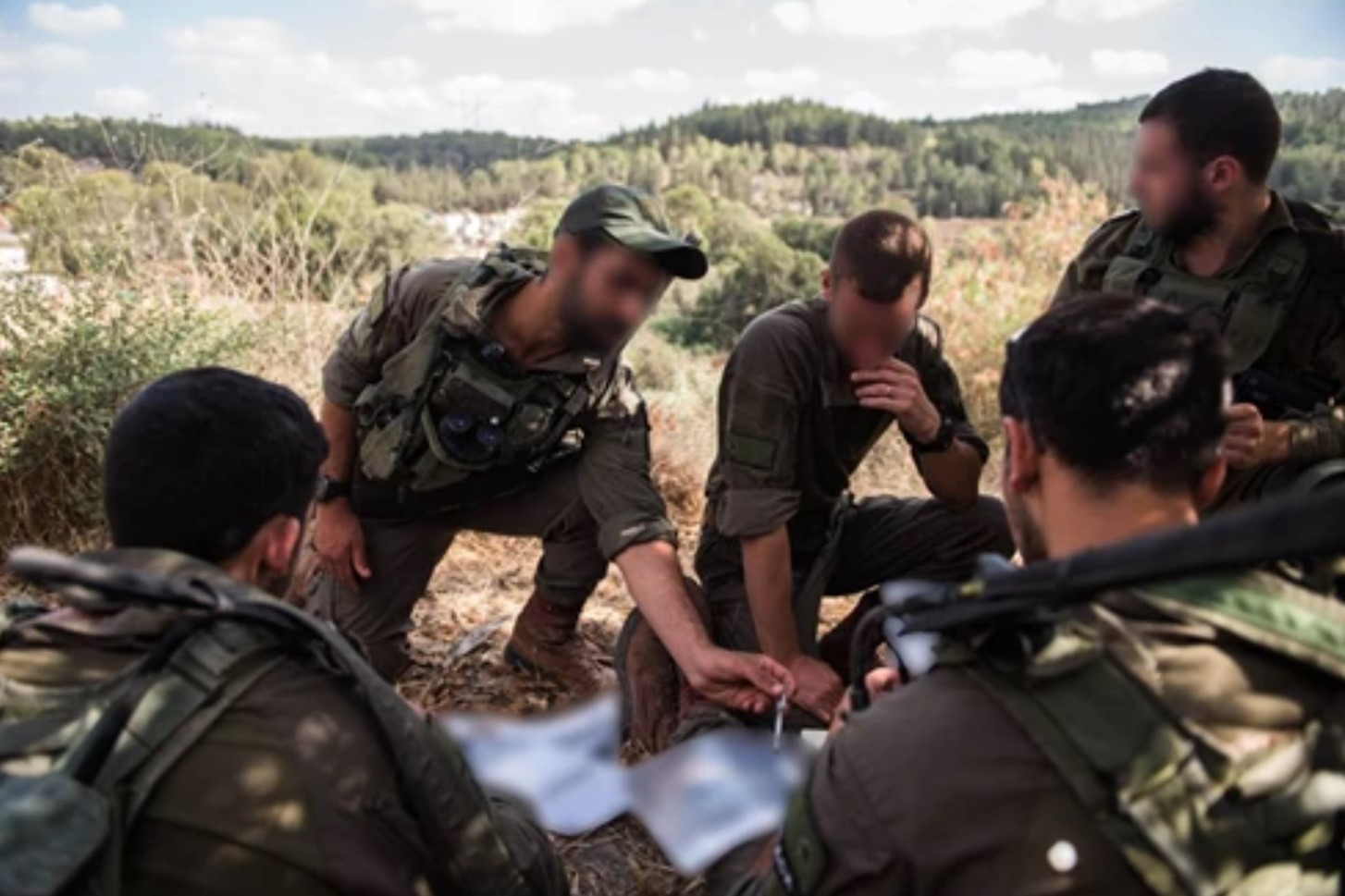
Egoz soldiers training in the northern arena

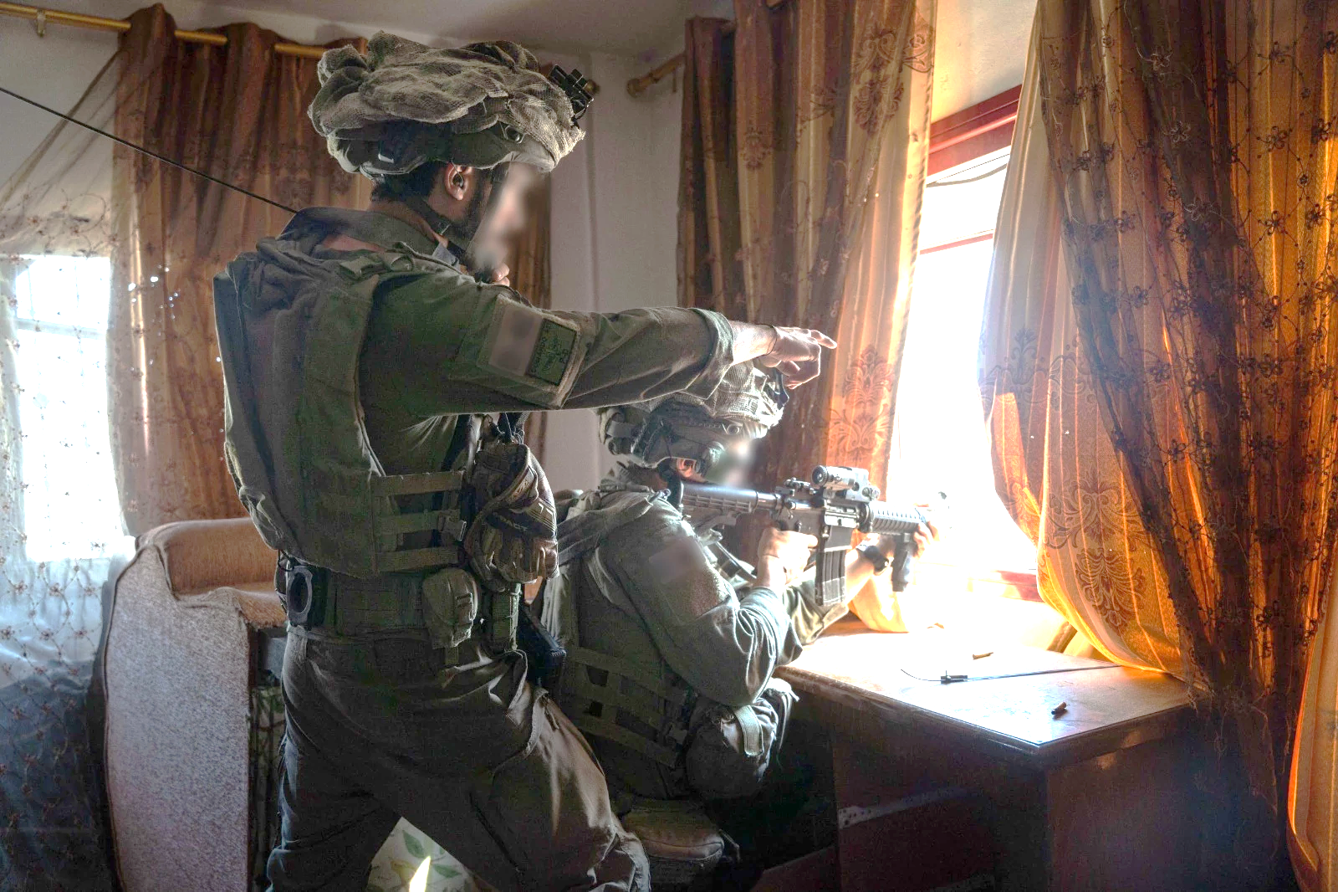
Egoz soldiers fighting in Rafah

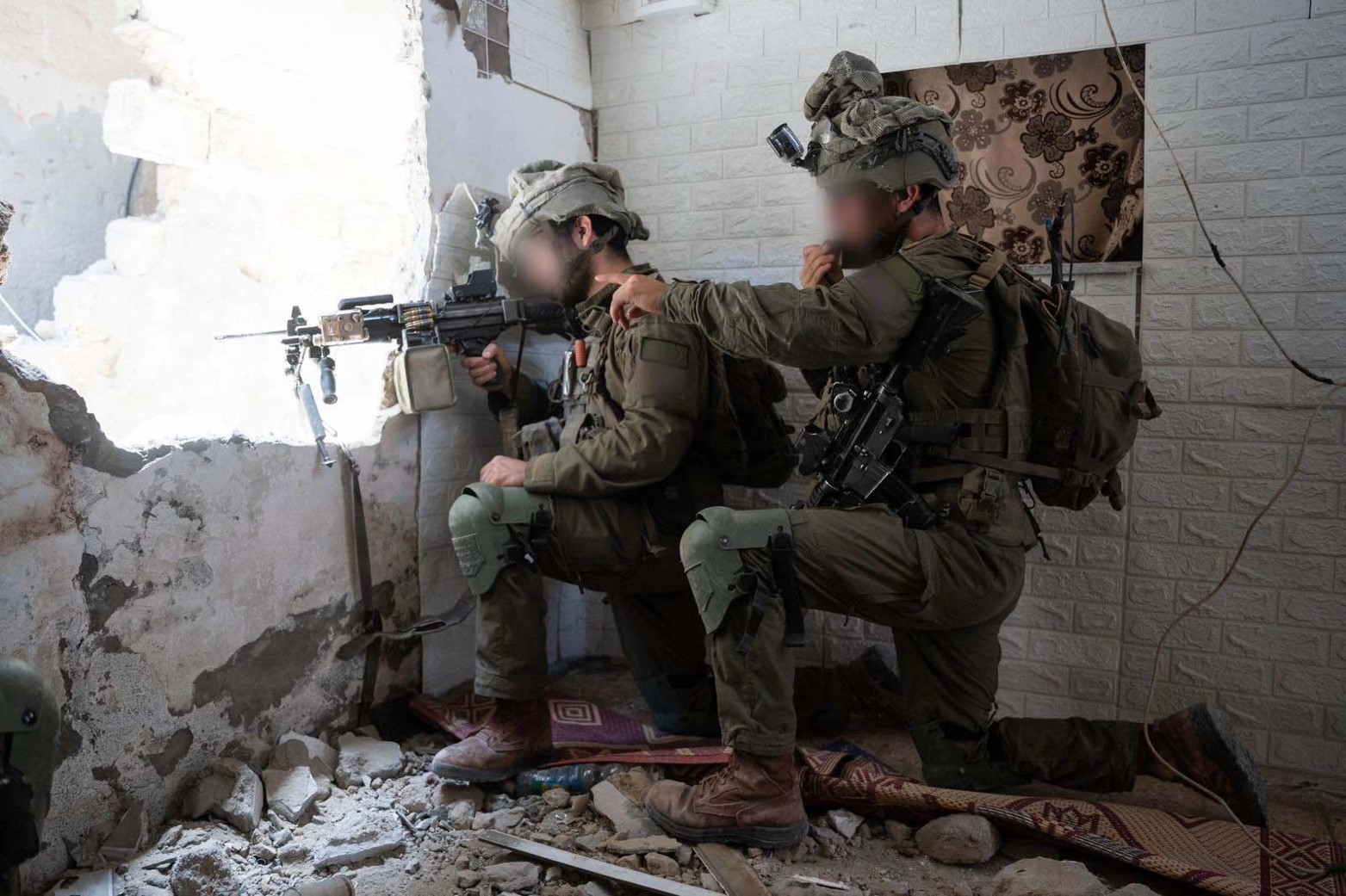
Egoz soldiers fighting in Rafah

== See also ==
- 11th 'Yiftach' Brigade – reserve formation made up of mostly Egoz veterans
- Sayeret, Hebrew term for 'special reconnaissance unit'
