= Dan Harel =

- דן הראל
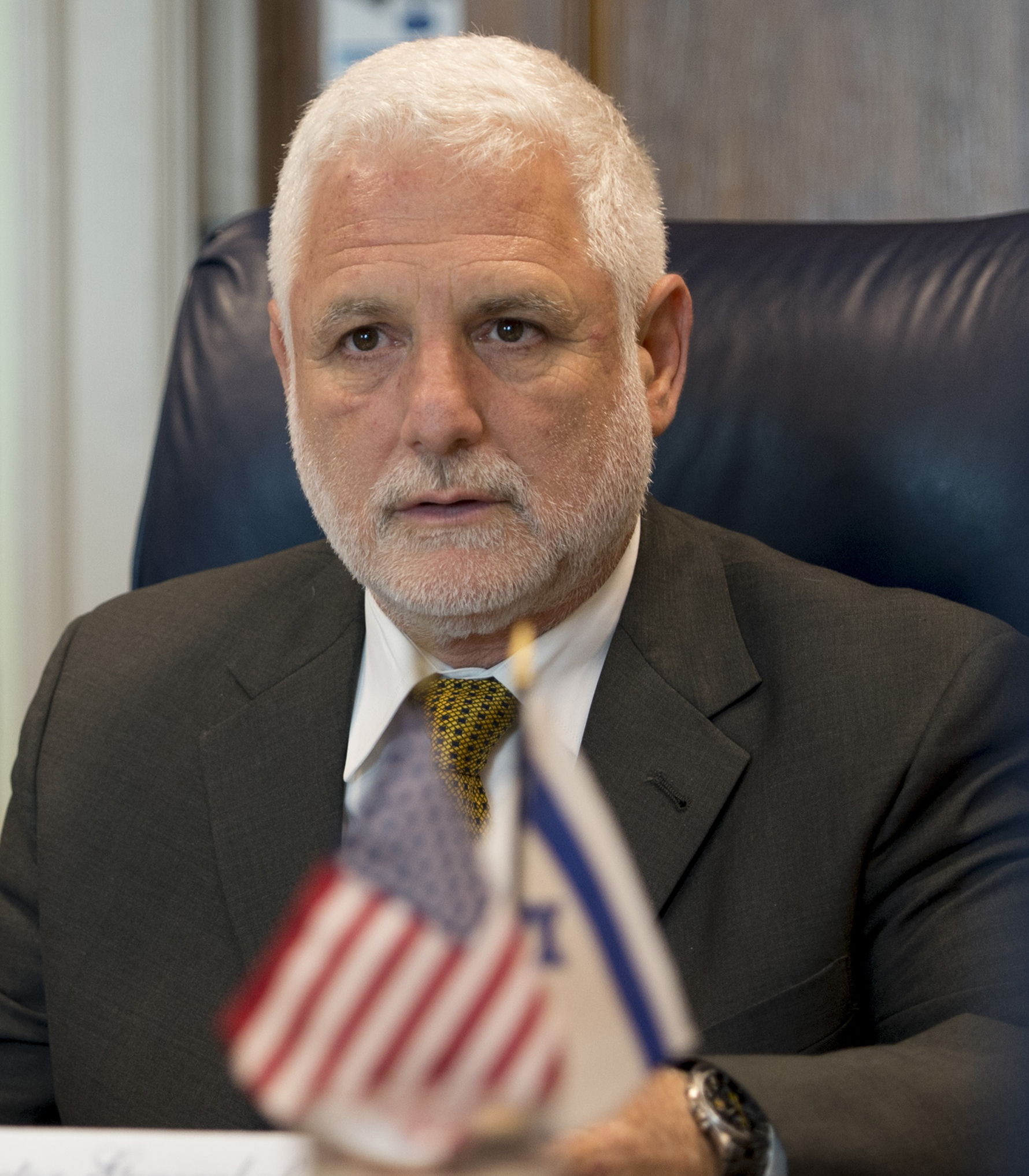
- Harel, October 2014
- Born: 1955 (age 70–71); Haifa, Israel
- Military career
- Allegiance: Israel
- Branch: Israel Defense Forces

Dan Harel (Hebrew: דן הראל; born 1955) is a retired general in the Israel Defense Forces and a former Deputy Chief of the General Staff. Harel served as the Director General of the Ministry of Defense from 2013 to 2016.

== Biography ==
Born in Haifa, Harel began his military career in 1974 at the Israeli Air Force flight school, however, in 1976 switched to the Israeli Artillery Corps. As he advanced up the chain of command, Harel participated in the 1982 Lebanon War as a battalion commander. He left the Artillery Corps in 1993 to become the Head of the Operations Department for the General Staff but returned in 1995 as its overall commander. He then served successively as Military Assistant to the Minister of Defense in 1998, an Armored Division commander in 2000, and head of the Operations Directorate in 2001. During this time Harel attended the US Advanced Artillery Officers' Course and the IDF Brigade Commanders' Course and also received a B.A. in Political Science from the University of Haifa.

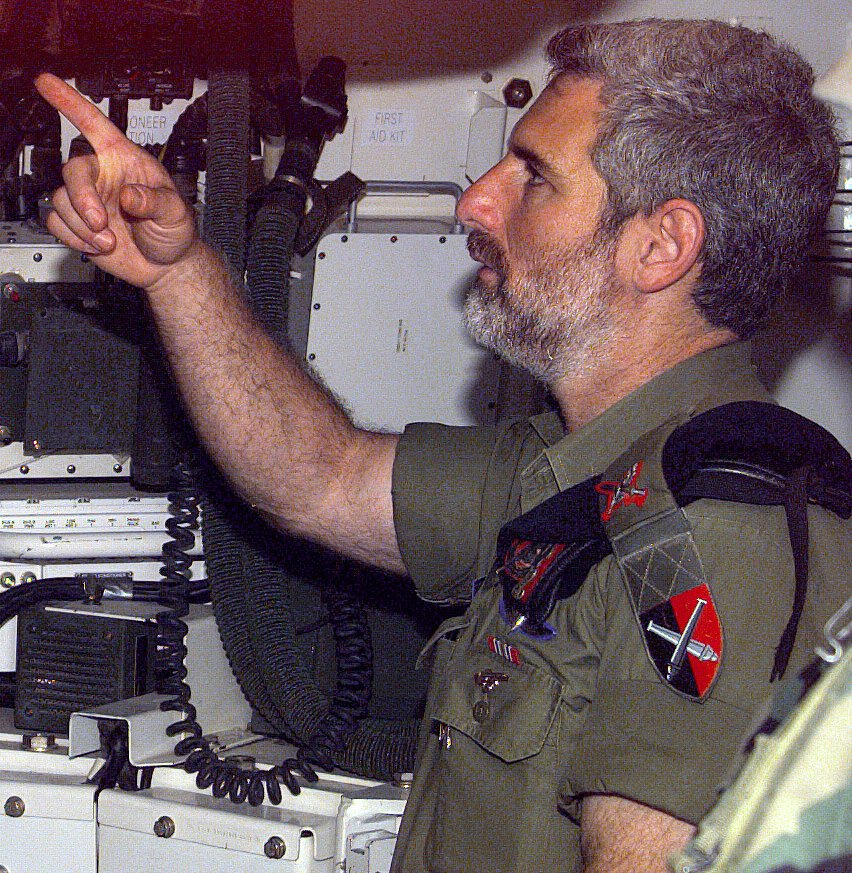
Dan Harel in 1997 as the Artillery Corps commander

Harel was later appointed head of the Southern Command, a position he held from 2003 to 2006. In this capacity, he not only implemented counterterrorism measures but was also the commander in charge of Israel's Gaza pull-out in the summer of 2005. The withdrawal was largely non-violent, although there was a last-stand of Israeli protesters at the community of Kfar Darom. While he did not aspire to conduct the operation, Harel carried out the assignment as a self-described "envoy of Israeli democracy". He later credited the mission's success to the nobility of the settlers and the restraint of the IDF troops, stating that now "the unity begins". Yet as rocket and mortar attacks have continued to be launched from the Gaza Strip against Israel, some Israeli papers have begun to criticize him for not planning for this predicted aftermath.

Though it was expected that he would retire after the disengagement, Harel was appointed Israel's Defense & Defense Cooperation attaché to Washington in January 2006, replacing Maj. Gen. Amos Yadlin. On October 1, 2007, he became Deputy Chief of the General Staff replacing Maj. General Moshe Kaplinsky.

In 2011, Harel was the CEO of the Israeli Ministry of Transportation. He resigned in October 2011.
