= Rafael Vardi =

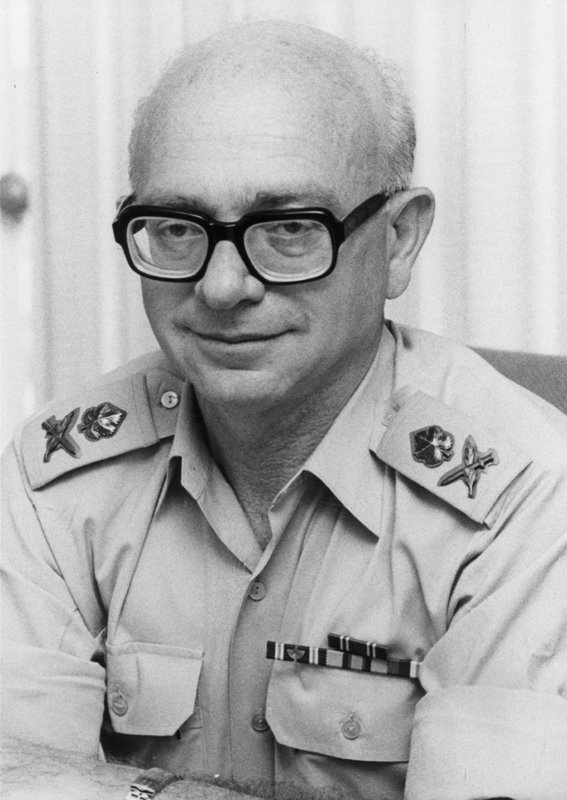
- Native name: רפאל ורדי
- Born: 1922; Łódź, Second Polish Republic
- Died: 25 December 2016 (aged 94) Israel
- Allegiance: Israel
- Branch: Haganah; Israel Defense Forces
- Service years: 1938–1981
- Rank: Aluf
- Commands: Chief Military Police Officer; Givati Brigade; Golani Brigade; Chief of staff for civil affairs; Manpower Directorate, 1976–1978
- Conflicts: 1947–1949 Palestine war; Sinai War; Six-Day War; War of Attrition; Yom Kippur War
- Spouse: Rinah Vardi (Hebrew: רנה ורדי)
- Other work: Defense Establishment Comptroller Unit

Rafael Vardi (Also spelled Raphael Vardi; Hebrew: רפאל ורדי; 1922 – 25 December 2016) was Israel Defense Forces Major General and former head of the Manpower Directorate. Vardi was also the Chief Military Police Officer from 1960 to 1962.

== Biography ==
Born in Łódź, Poland, Vardi immigrated to Israel in 1932. He attended the Gymnasia Balfour in Tel Aviv along with Shimon Peres. The two met in seventh grade after the Peres' family arrived from Poland. At 16, Vardi enlisted into the Haganah serving as a battalion commander of the Givati Brigade during the 1947–1949 Palestine war. Vardi later served as the Head of the Office of the Deputy Chief of Staff, Deputy Commander of the Golani Brigade (1952-1953), and as the Tel Aviv District Commander.

During the Sinai War, Vardi served as the Deputy Commander of the Reserve Division. Between 1957 and 1960, Vardi served as a Military attaché in Burma and Thailand. From 1960 until 1962 he served as the Chief Military Police Officer. Vardi later served as an instructor in the National Security College from 1962 until 1967. During that time, Vardi received his Bachelor of Laws from the School of Law and Economics. In 1966 he became a lawyer.

During the Six-Day War, Vardi served as the Jerusalem District Commander. After the war he became the Commander of the Judea and Samaria Area. He received a master's degree in law from the Hebrew University of Jerusalem. In July 1968 Vardi became one of the first military personnel to become Brigadier general in the IDF. In 1974 he was appointed Coordinator of Government Activities in the Territories. In 1976 Vardi was appointed head of the Manpower Directorate, a position he held until 1978. He joined the Defense Establishment Comptroller Unit in 1980. Vardi left the unit after the appointment of Ariel Sharon to the Minister of Defense in 1981. In August 1983, Vardi was appointed Director General of the State Comptroller of Israel. Vardi resigned in 1985 after a disagreement with Itzchak Tonic.

Following the recommendations of the Shamgar Commission, which assessed the bodies responsible for the safety and welfare of the Prime Minister, Vardi was appointed head of staff of monitoring and control in charge of implementing the new security measures designed to improve security and efficiency.

In 1999, Prime Minister Ehud Barak appointed Vardi to investigate the functioning of the Broadcasting Authority. Vardi published a report to the prime minister, warning about the dysfunctionality of the organization. The report calls for a redefinition of the roles of the Broadcasting Authority. The report recommended new legislation to completely separate the public management sector from the administrative sector.

Vardi later headed the committee on security issues which included the Liaison Bureau, the IDF Fund, the Rehabilitation Department of the Ministry of Defense, the Israel Defense Forces and Defense Establishment Archives, and the Commission of Inquiry on the subject of interrogation and torture of Iran–Contra affair.

He was married to Rinah Vardi (Hebrew: רנה ורדי). They had a daughter (Yael), and two sons: Tal Vardi, who served as an officer in the IDF Paratroopers reconnaissance unit; and Michael Vardi, who served as an officer in the Armored Corps in the Yom Kippur War; where he was killed in a battle. He received the Medal of Courage posthumously.
