= Deputy Chief of the General Staff (Israel) =

Second highest position of the IDF

Deputy Chief of the General Staff of the Israel Defense Forces
- סגן ראש המטה הכללי

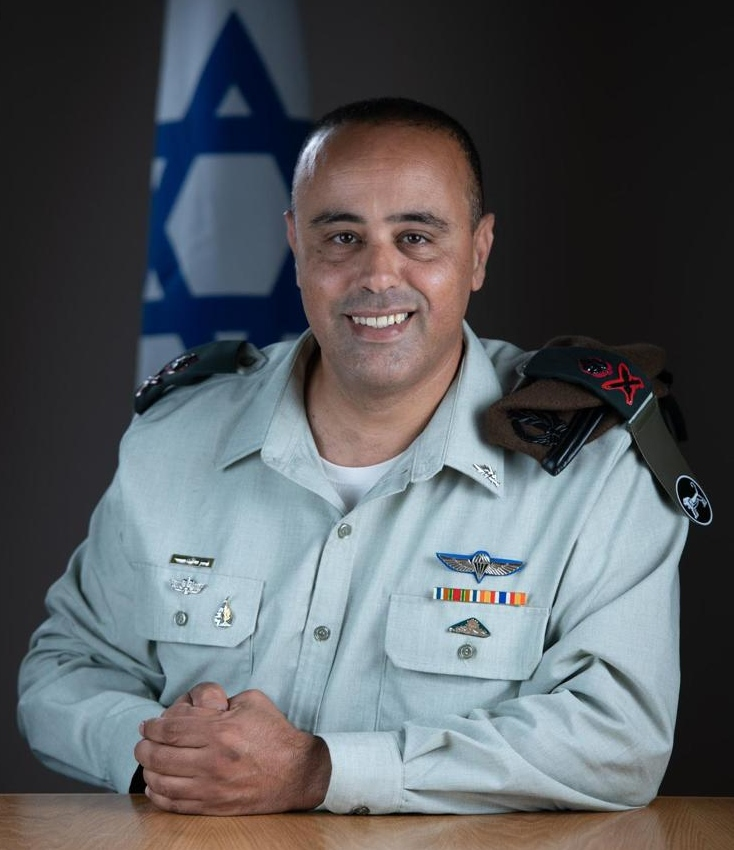
- Incumbent; Tamir Yadai since 6 March 2025
- Formation: January 1948
- First holder: Tzvi Ayalon

The rank of the deputy chief of staff (Aluf)

The Deputy Chief of the General Staff is the second to the Chief of General Staff of the Israel Defense Forces. The deputy chief of staff is an officer with the rank of major general (Aluf). The current deputy chief of staff is Major General (Aluf) Tamir Yadai.

== History ==
The position of deputy chief of staff was not continuously filled. Until 1999, deputy chiefs of staff served as the commanders of the General Staff Directorate simultaneously, With the exception of Haim Bar-Lev, who held office on the eve of and during the Six Day War, and Israel Tal, who held office after the Yom Kippur War. In 1999, the Operations Directorate was established and the positions were officially separated, Since then, it is common to see the deputy chief of staff as the person in charge of the IDF force building, Procurement, development, equipping and maintenance of weapons, planning, recruitment and training of personnel and maintaining their fitness and more. Despite legislative proposals on the matter, the deputy chief of staff is not defined by law as acting in place of the chief of staff.

Since 2005 The Control and Surveillance Department in the IDF has been subordinate to the deputy chief of staff. In 2016–2017, the Computer Service Directorate was also subordinate to the deputy chief of staff.

The acting deputy chief of staff is usually one of the natural candidates to replace the outgoing chief of staff. And it is accepted to see the fulfillment of the position as an "apprenticeship" before taking command of the IDF. 19 of the 22 chiefs of staff who have headed the IDF to date, previously served in the position of deputy chief of staff, usually close to their appointment as chief of the General Staff.

== List of deputy chiefs ==
Picture	Name	Period of serving	Chief of Staff	Remarks
	Tzvi Ayalon	January 1948	Yaakov Dori	
	Mordechai Maklef	9 November 1949 – 7 December 1952	Yigael Yadin	3rd Chief of Staff
	Moshe Dayan	7 December 1952 – December 1953	Mordechai Maklef	4th Chief of Staff
	Haim Laskov	20 August 1955 – 23 July 1956	Moshe Dayan	5th Chief of Staff
	Tzvi Tzur	1958 – 1958	Haim Laskov	6th Chief of Staff
	Yitzhak Rabin	23 January 1961 – 30 December 1963	Tzvi Tzur	7th Chief of Staff
	Haim Bar-Lev	May 1967 – January 1968	Yitzhak Rabin	8th Chief of Staff
	David Elazar	1969 – January 1972	Haim Bar-Lev	9th Chief of Staff
	Israel Tal	1972 – 1973	David Elazar	
	Herzl Shafir	April 1974 – March 1976	Mordechai Gur	7th commissioner of the Israeli Police
	Rafael Eitan	August 1977 – April 1978	Mordechai Gur	11th Chief of Staff
	Yekutiel Adam	1978 – 1982	Rafael Eitan	Killed in the 1982 Lebanon War before he could take up his post as Chief of Staff
	Moshe Levi	1982 – 1983	Rafael Eitan	12th Chief of Staff
	David Ivry	1983 – 1985	Moshe Levi	
	Dan Shomron	17 January 1985 – 1 October 1986	Moshe Levi	13th Chief of Staff
	Amir Drori	1 October 1986 – 6 April 1987	Dan Shomron	
	Ehud Barak	7 May 1987 – 13 March 1991	Dan Shomron	14th Chief of Staff
	Amnon Lipkin-Shahak	13 March 1991 – 29 November 1994	Ehud Barak	15th Chief of Staff
	Matan Vilnai	29 November 1994 – 15 September 1997	Amnon Lipkin-Shahak	
	Shaul Mofaz	15 September 1997 – 11 June 1998	Amnon Lipkin-Shahak	16th Chief of Staff
	Uzi Dayan	11 June 1998 – 15 September 2000	Shaul Mofaz	
	Moshe Ya'alon	15 September 2000 – 9 July 2002	Shaul Mofaz	17th Chief of Staff
	Gabi Ashkenazi	9 July 2002 – 15 July 2004	Moshe Ya'alon	19th Chief of Staff
	Dan Halutz	15 July 2004 – 17 March 2005	Moshe Ya'alon	18th Chief of Staff
	Moshe Kaplinsky	17 March 2005 – 1 October 2007	Dan Halutz	
	Dan Harel	1 October 2007 – 1 October 2009	Gabi Ashkenazi	Director-general of Defense Ministry
	Benny Gantz	1 October 2009 – 25 November 2010	Gabi Ashkenazi	20th Chief of Staff
	Yair Naveh	25 November 2010 – 14 January 2013	Benny Gantz	
	Gadi Eizenkot	14 January 2013 – 15 December 2014	Benny Gantz	21st Chief of Staff
	Yair Golan	15 December 2014 – 11 May 2017	Gadi Eizenkot	
	Aviv Kochavi	11 May 2017 – 13 December 2018	Gadi Eizenkot	22nd Chief of Staff
	Eyal Zamir	13 December 2018 – 11 July 2021	Aviv Kochavi	24th Chief of Staff
	Herzi Halevi	11 July 2021 – 31 October 2022	Aviv Kochavi	23rd Chief of Staff
	Amir Baram	31 October 2022 – 6 March 2025	Herzi Halevi; Eyal Zamir	
	Tamir Yadai	6 March 2025 – present	Eyal Zamir	
