= Directorate of Defence Research & Development =

Joint Israeli administration

Mafat logo

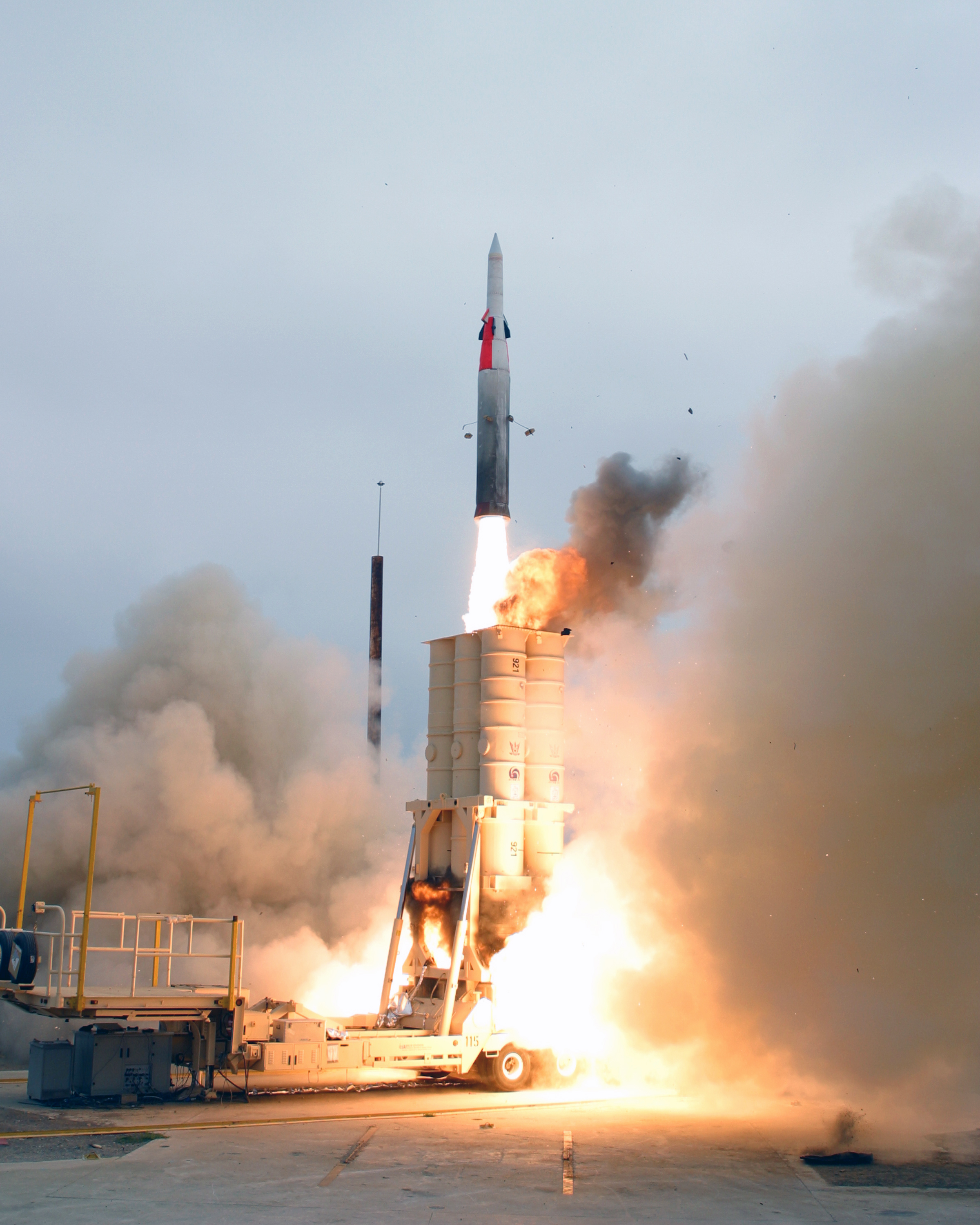
Arrow anti-ballistic missile launch

The Directorate of Defense, Research, & Development (IMOD DDR&D or DDR&D) (Hebrew: מינהל למחקר, פיתוח אמצעי לחימה ותשתית טכנולוגית), abbreviated Maf'at (מפא"ת), is a joint administrative body of the Israel Ministry of Defense (IMOD) and the Israel Defense Force (IDF).

The DDR&D is charged with the development of innovative concepts for defense technology, managing the Israel Ministry of Defense's short and long term projects relating to defensive technology, serving as a professional technical body for the research and development of military and defensive technology, cooperating with international partners in the field of research and development, and training the defense establishments next generation of personnel and tech professionals. The DDR&D cooperates with the IMOD and the IDF, defense companies such as IMI Systems, Israel Aerospace Industries, Rafael Advanced Defense Systems, Elbit Systems, the Institute for Biological Research, the Israel Space Agency, startups, academic institutions, and more.

The DDR&D employs approximately 1000 men and women, 75% of whom are officers and soldiers and 25% of whom are civilians. The Director of the DDR&D reports to both the Director General of the Israel Ministry of Defense and the Chief of the General Staff of Israel. Brigadier General (Res.) Dr. Daniel Gold is the current director of the DDR&D since 2016.

== Mission ==
The DDR&D's mission statement is to make sure it "guarantees Israel's ability to protect its civilians and maintain its qualitative military edge."

== Subdivisions ==
The subdivisions of the DDR&D are assigned the development of innovative military and defensive technology. These subdivisions include:

=== Military Research and Development Unit (היחידה למחקר ופיתוח - מו"פ) ===
The Military Research and Development Unit is charged with initiating and leading technological research and development projects for the DDR&D. The unit is tasked with two main functions. First, to initiate and conduct research, advance development projects, and promote the technology and building blocks for future systems. Secondly, they are responsible for managing the progress of these projects and bringing them to their full operational capabilities (Full Scale Development).

The IDF's qualitative military edge and many of its operational capabilities are largely based on the systems developed by this unit. Cooperation with academic institutes, research institutes, high-tech companies, defense industries, and the military, enables the unit to combine congruent technologies and find solutions to close operational gaps. The departments under and in cooperation with this sub-division are:

- Missiles and Aerodynamics Department (מחלקת מטאו"ר - מערכות טילים אווירונאוטיקה) - Responsible for initiating and developing rocket and missile systems and solutions for operational needs such as: maintaining aerial superiority and defense, attacking field targets, land-based combat in enemy territory, naval superiority based on missiles, aircraft and unmanned aerial vehicles (UAVs) and support systems for the various branches of the IDF.
- Ground forces Systems Department (מחלקת מערכות יבשה) - Charged with meeting the armament needs of the IDF (particularly those of the Ground Forces), and defense establishment by developing technology such as unmanned vehicles, weapons and ammunition, non-lethal weapons, future combat vehicles, and more. Products from this department include the Trophy, among the world's most effective active protection systems (APS), and the only operational, combat-proven APS defending tanks from artillery and mortar fire.
- Optronics Department (מחלקת אופטרוניקה) - Manages the initiation and development of technological components and antennas for electro-optical systems. The Optronics department is engaged in the R&D of advanced systems with the ability to operate on both land and air through, among its technological developments, accurate optronic tools and the development of laser systems.
- Systems Department (מחלקת מערכות) - A workshop for all Radio Frequency (RF) sensors and the realization of their abilities in their respective fields, this department is responsible for the research and development of technologies in the field of SIGINT, radar, electronic warfare (EW), and underwater, physics related acoustics. This department works in cooperation with several branches of the IDF, as well as with defense industries and academic institutions.
- Cyber Department (מחלקת סייבר) - Tasked with the initiation and R&D in the offensive and defensive cyber fields both with the defense cyber community and with the civilian cyber community (national cyber system, government ministries).
- Small Units Department (מחלקת רכ"ז - רכיבים זעירים) – Preserves the development, production, and delivery of technological building blocks in the field of microelectronics. This department's goal is to achieve independence in the development of larger systems, radars, communications, and applicable technologies.
- Performance Analysis Department (מחלקת חק"ב - חקר ביצועים) - Assists in the decision making process and development of technology, particularly during the early stages. The department studies new technology and examines how it can best be applied to meet the IDF's operational requirements. Decisions are made following the application of quantitative and scientific evaluation tools including war games, computer simulations, trials, processing, and analysis, among other evaluation tools. In order to conduct research in this field, members of the department have in-depth knowledge of the IDF's needs and capabilities, as well as awareness of the characteristics of the modern battlefield.
- CTO Department (מחלקת CTO) - Conducts the initiation and development of new, breakthrough technology. The department's work helps integrate the research and development of the DDR&D and the IDF, and contributes to the preservation of the defense establishment's qualitative edge. The CTO department also deals with the R&D of dual use technology and manages the Ministry of Defense Innovation Center.

=== Science and Technology Unit (היחידה למדע וטכנולוגיה - מד"ט) ===
The Science and Technology Unit (previously Research and Technological Infrastructure Unit/היחידה למחקר ותשתית טכנולוגית - מת"ט) is responsible for defense related technological infrastructure and applied scientific research. This unit is a crucial component in the development of the defense establishment's strategic capabilities and predominantly focuses on long term technological developments. The unit's mission is to identify, develop and promote diverse tech solutions to address Israel's current and future security needs. They are responsible for, among other things, building, upgrading and developing infrastructure and testing facilities for the defense establishment. The key areas of focus of this unit include:

- Infrastructure, facilities, and simulators.
- Quantum technology.
- Nano-technology and micro-technology.
- Physics, space and energy.
- Military medicine, ergonomics.
- Aerospace engineering.
- Chemical and energetic materials.
- Biological engineering.

As part of its mission, this unit initiates interdisciplinary activities and research, stimulating the development of new initiatives and encouraging the advancement of collaborative Israeli research. The unit operates in collaboration with other units under the DDR&D and the defense establishment, while maintaining constant contact with the highest levels of the international research and development community, with the aim of investing in Israel's long term operational capabilities.

=== Israel Missile Defense Organization (IMDO/"מנהלת ההגנה מטילים ורקטות - "חומה) ===
The IMDO is responsible for the R&D and equipment of active defense systems such as the Iron Dome, David's Sling, Arrow-2 and Arrow-3, as well as detection and warning systems such as Sky Dew. The IMDO works in cooperation with the American Missile Defense Agency (MDA), on joint ventures and the development of defense systems. The David's Sling, Arrow series, and Sky Dew systems are such examples of joint developments between the IMDO and the MDA. Though the Iron Dome was developed by the IMDO, the equipment of the system was carried out jointly by with the MDA. The IMDO is responsible for the development, management and improvement of Israel's active defense systems including interceptors, launchers, radars, command and control systems, network connectivity and more. Today, Israel is protected by a multi-layered defense array, which includes the Arrow-2, Arrow-3, David's Sling, and Iron Dome active defense systems.

- Iron Dome - Intercepts short-range surface-to-surface rockets (lower layer).
- David's Sling - Intercepts short to medium and medium to long range surface-to-surface missiles (middle layer).
- Arrow-2 - Intercepts medium to long range missiles (upper layer).
- Arrow-3 - Intercepts long-range missiles (upper layer).

Many of the IMDO's initiatives are carried out in close collaboration with the MDA and receive joint funding. The relationship between these two organizations also translates into the cooperation between Israeli and American defense industries, which serve as key contributors to the development and production processes of the defense array.

=== UAV Administration (מנהלת מל"טים) ===
The UAV Administration is responsible for managing the unmanned aircraft systems for Israeli security forces in lower, middle, and upper layer operating altitudes. These systems are primarily used for reconnaissance, infantry support, and assault missions. This administration works in cooperation with the Israeli Air Force, Navy, and Ground Forces, as well as with Israeli defense industries and subcontractors. The Administration is responsible for the development and production of UAV elements, including communication systems, payloads and other mission stations. Their responsibilities include:

- Leading, coordinating, and managing the development of UAV systems.
- Serving as a center of knowledge in the global UAV market.
- Making use of advanced technology to adapt to global trends.
- Promoting Israeli product development.
- Supporting the IDF and addressing its operational needs.
- Operating in conjunction with Israel's Air Force, Navy, Ground Forces and Intelligence.

Among the known platforms of the DDR&D, the UAVs currently in service include the Spark, Skylark 1, Eitan (Heron TP), Shoval (Heron 1), Hermes 450, and Hermes 900. IDF ground and naval forces also operate a system of UAVs. These systems are divided into a three tier ranking – lower (maximum altitude: 5,000 feet), intermediate (maximum altitude: 20,000 feet), and upper (maximum altitude: 40,000 feet).

=== Space and Satellite Administration (מנהלת החלל "אתגר" - מת"ה) ===
The Space and Satellite Administration coordinates all of Israel's aerospace defense activities and is responsible for the development, production, and launching of satellites and launchers. Technological developments are led by members of the Space Administration and carried out by Israel's defense industries. The Ministry of Defense's multiyear space and satellite development program is intended to enhance Israel's strategic capabilities, propel its high-tech industries, and create jobs. The State of Israel's significant investment in the aerospace field has led to the development of strategic defensive products, primarily in the field of intelligence. At the forefront of Israel's space program is the Ofek satellite series.

== Operations ==
- Promoting the technological and scientific infrastructure needed for military research and development
- Deciding on the direction of research and development
- Analysis and coordination of work related to research and development
- Purchasing and project management for the IDF arms
- Maintaining relations with foreign elements in security-related areas of research and development and infrastructure
- Providing information to those in the Security Forces who engage in research and development.
- Operating the Talpiot program for IDF recruits interested in research and development; the Psagot Excellence Program for the intense education and then utilization of elite IDF recruits chosen to be elite R&D engineers, and the Katzir Fellowships Program for promoting technological human resources
- A MAFAT report released on January 21, 2026 indicates that Israeli defense-tech startups secured NIS 1.08 billion in government orders during 2025. This investment is part of a strategic initiative to preserve Israel’s Qualitative Military Edge, and ensure economic resilience by accelerating the "battle-to-innovation" cycle. The report highlights a significant integration of early-stage commercial technology directly into operational military use, with focus areas including AI-driven autonomous platforms (which accounted for 32.5% of total deal value), cyber defense (17.7%), and counter-drone hardware. To maintain technological sovereignty and support a diverse ecosystem, MAFAT has committed to allocating at least 10% of its future R&D budgets specifically to startups, nearly half of which are currently in pre-seed or seed stages.

=== Maf'at central operating bodies ===
- War Material Development
- Research and Technological Infrastructure
- External Relations
- Planning Administrations ^{[Serves as the organizational framework for central projects, operating as independent or partially integrated bodies]}

=== Staff and support bodies ===
- Planning and Operations
- Computerization
- Human Resources
- Communication
- Controllership
- Defense
- Management

=== Ministry of Defense purchasing divisions ===
Maf'at employs both civilians from the Ministry of Defense and IDF personal. It is one of five other Ministry of Defense purchasing divisions:

- Production and Purchasing Administration
- Building Branch
- Logistical Operations and Assets Branch
- Planning Administrations ^{[See above]}
- Overseas Purchasing Missions

=== Administration head ===
The Administration has been headed by Brigadier General (Ret.) Danny Gold, who is one of three civilian members in the General Staff.
