= Tzvi Ayalon =

First Israeli Defense Forces Deputy Chief of Staff

Aluf Tzvi Ayalon
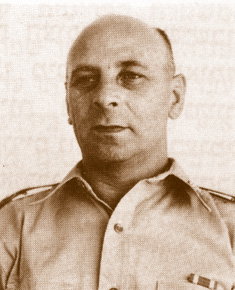
- Native name: צבי איילון
- Born: Tzvi Lashchiner; 15 June 1911; Russian Empire
- Died: 4 March 1993 (aged 81) Israel
- Allegiance: Israel
- Branch: Haganah; Israel Defense Forces
- Service years: 1927–1965 (38 years)
- Rank: Aluf (Major General)
- Commands: Various Haganah training camps; Haganah commander of the Northern Galilee; General Staff; Central Command; Deputy Chief of Staff; Technological and Logistics Directorate
- Conflicts: 1929 Palestine riots; 1936–1939 Arab revolt in Palestine; 1948 Palestine war
- Other work: Director of the licensing department at the Ministry of Transportation; Auditor of the Tel Aviv Municipality

Tzvi Ayalon (Hebrew: צבי איָילון; 15 June 1911 – 4 March 1993) was a Haganah leader and a major general (Aluf) in the Israel Defense Forces, he served as the first Deputy Chief of General Staff as well as the commander of the Central Command (Israel). After his military service he served as the deputy director-general of the Ministry of Defense (Israel) and Ambassador of Israel in Romania.

== Biography ==
=== Early life ===
Ayalon was born in the Russian Empire in the summer of 1911, son of Esther and Meir Lashchiner. In 1923, as a young teenager, he immigrated to the British mandate of Palestine. Studied at the Reali School in Haifa and at the Mikveh Israel Agricultural School.

=== Haganah service ===
At the age of 16, he joined the Jewish paramilitary organization Haganah. He served as a platoon commander during the 1929 Palestine riots; in which he was injured. He served from 1936 in the permanent apparatus of the Haganah in the Haifa area, and held command and training positions in the area, and later in the northern Galilee area. In 1943 he instructed the officers' course of the Haganah organization in Joara. In 1944 he was appointed commander of the Northern Galilee. Later he was a senior staff officer in the General Staff. He was a partner in formulating the idea of the Field Force (Hish) and the combat theory of 'offensive defense'. On the eve of the outbreak of the War of Independence, he served as a planning officer at the General Staff.

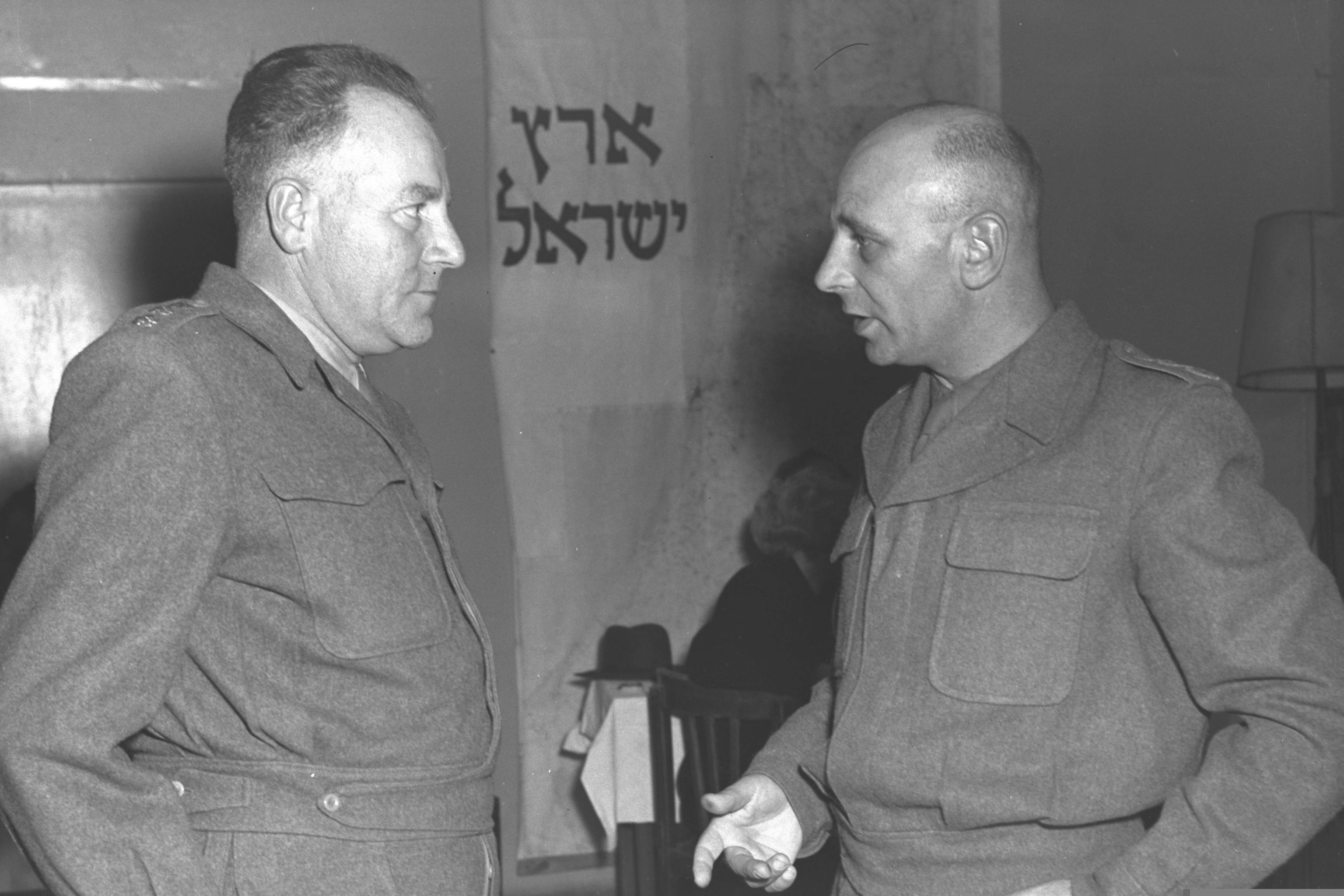
Tzvi Ayalon (on the right) with Yosef Avidar, 1949

=== IDF service ===
In January 1948, he was appointed Deputy Chief of Staff, and with the establishment of the IDF in May of that year, he continued in his position, with the rank of Major General (Aluf). At the same time as his position as Deputy Chief of Staff, he was the commander of the Third Front (today the Central Command), which commanded the forces that fought in and around Jerusalem.

Due to the illness of the Chief of Staff Yaakov Dori, he was the acting Chief of Staff for a while. While acting as Chief of Staff, he signed arrest warrants for the Altalena defendants as well as Meir Tobiansky's arrest warrant.

After the war he was responsible for the creation of the IDF parade in July 1949, which took place after the failure of the parade that did not march on the Independence Day.

In 1952 he was appointed head of logistics department (today Technological and Logistics Directorate) and in 1954 he was appointed as commander of the Central Command (Israel), a position which he served in until February 1956.

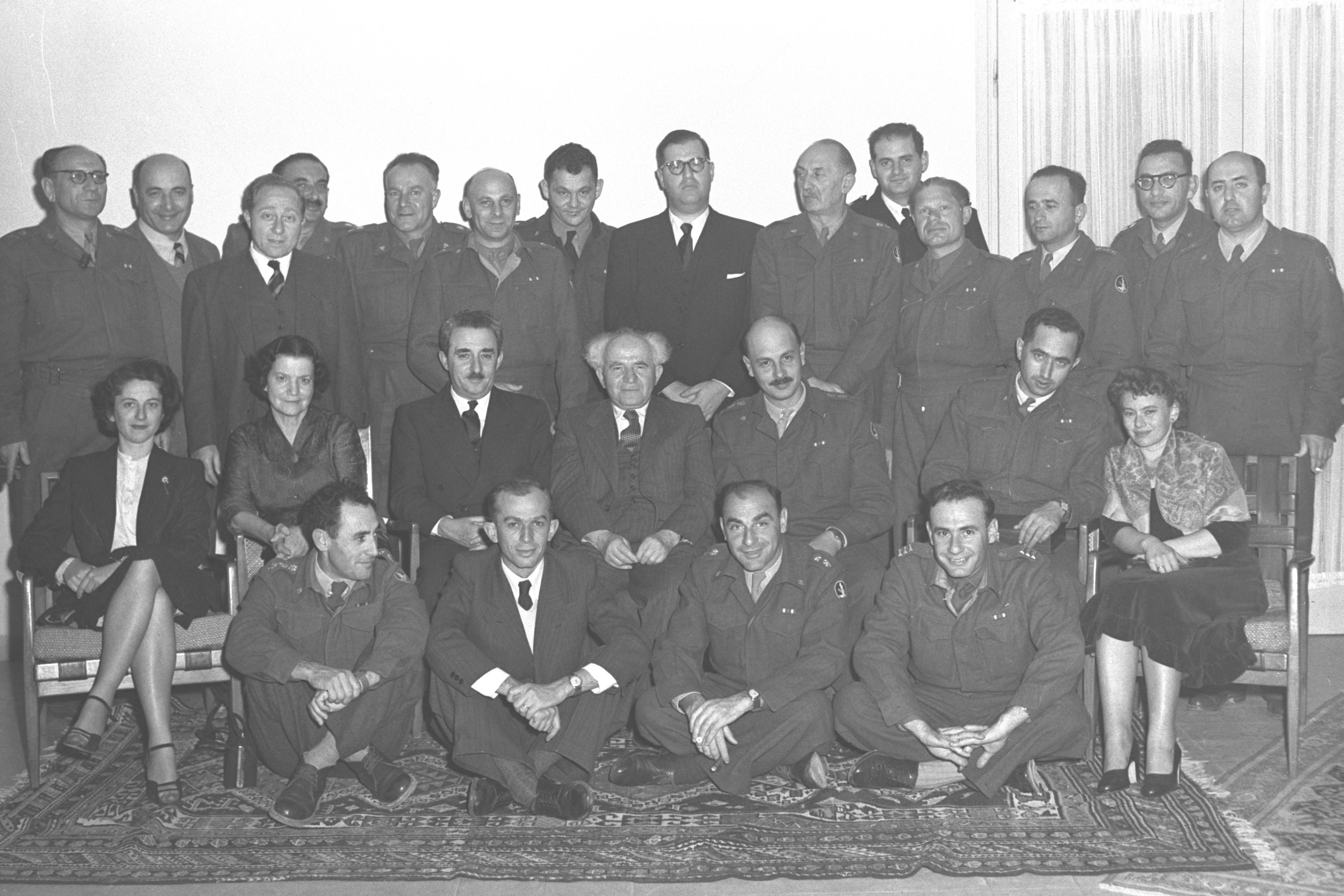
Prime Minister David Ben-Gurion, Foreign Minister Moshe Sharett, Chief of Staff Yigal Yadin and senior Israeli army officers attended a ceremony for Aluf Maklef. Tzvi Ayalon (on the left behind Ben-Gurion)

In August 1957 he was appointed head of the Construction and Assets Division at the Ministry of Defense, in July 1958 he was appointed by then Prime Minister and Minister of Defense David Ben-Gurion as Deputy Director of the economic affairs of the Ministry of Defense, and in 1964 he served as the Ambassador of Israel in Romania.

=== Other work ===
He officially left his military service in 1965 and became the director of the licensing department at the Ministry of Transportation and as auditor of the Tel Aviv Municipality. in 1968 he co-founded the Council for a Beautiful Israel.

== Awards and decorations ==
Tzvi Ayalon was awarded one campaign ribbons for his service.

Israeli Independence war

== Personal life ==
In 1931 he married Rachel Katznelson (who died in the spring of 1970), and was the father of two.
