= Katzir Fellowships =

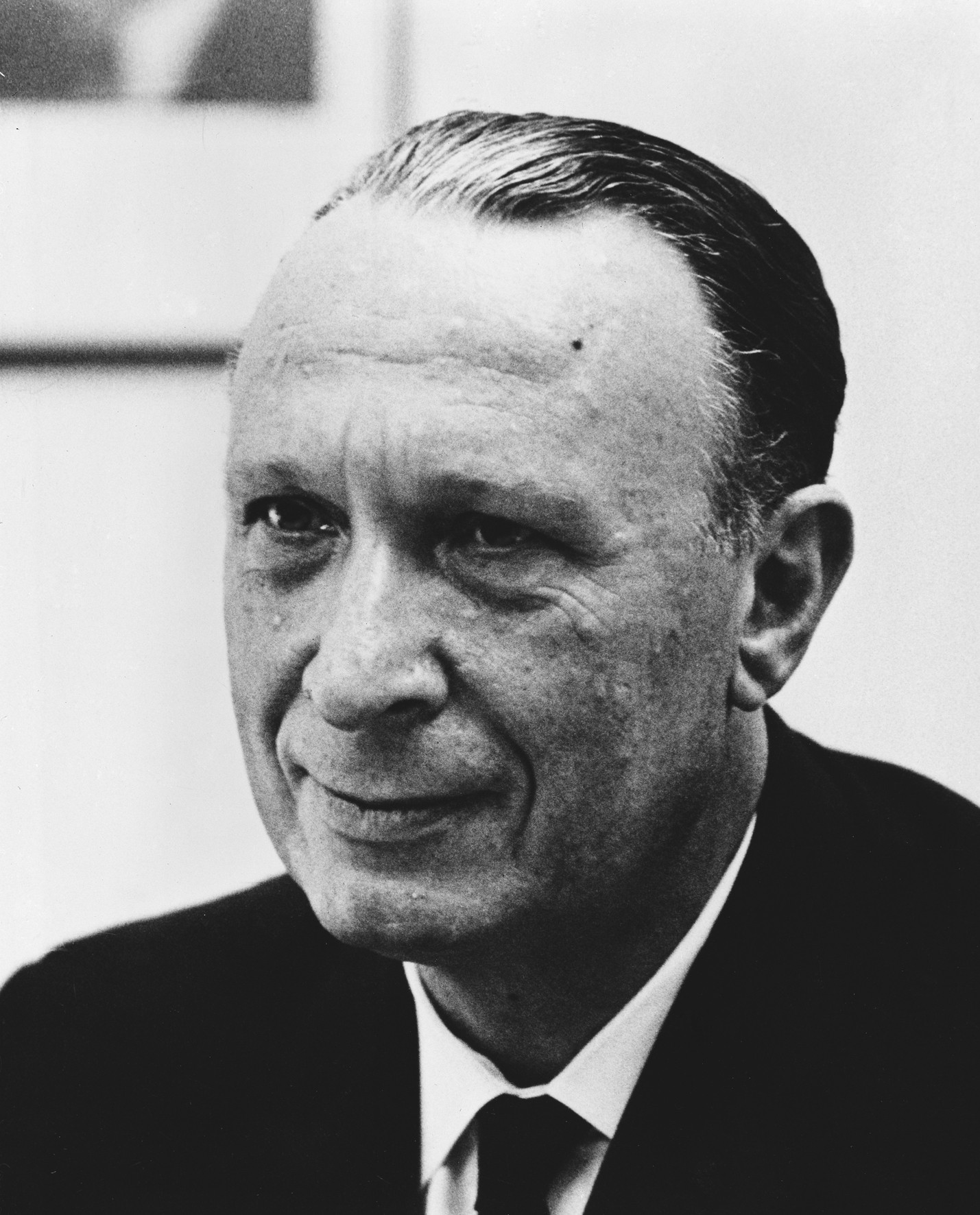
Prof. Aharon Katzir

The Katzir Fellowships is an Israeli research-granting program, founded in 1991, that was developed in order to recruit high-quality scientists to national defense research and development agencies, who in the future will become the leaders of these technological branches. The program was recommended by a committee which advises the minister of defense on research and development in the defense sector, led by Professor Joshua Jortner.

The fellowship's committee (which was named after Professor Aharon Katzir) provides for outstanding scientists who specialize in science and technology a three-year fellowships intended to finance training, as well as a three-year fellowship during the transitional period into the defense sector and into the research work within this sector. The fellowships are awarded to eligible scientists within the program under the initiative and patronage of the minister of defense, and it operates under the purview of the Administration for the Development of Weapons and Technological Infrastructure (Maf'at) within the ministry of defense (which also manages within the framework of technological and research training the Psagot and Talpiot programs).

According to the program's policies, the fellowship committee "will put forth efforts to successfully recruit brilliant young scientists, who will grow within the research and development sector and who can lead the sector to meet the needs of the new millennium." The institution that receives the fellows is responsible for designing their training programs, customized to their skills, experience and the issues to which they are assigned. The training program includes training fellows and placing them in positions that will further their training to management positions in defense research and development agencies scattered in various parts of the Israel.
