= Shlomi Binder =

IDF military personnel

- שלומי בינדר
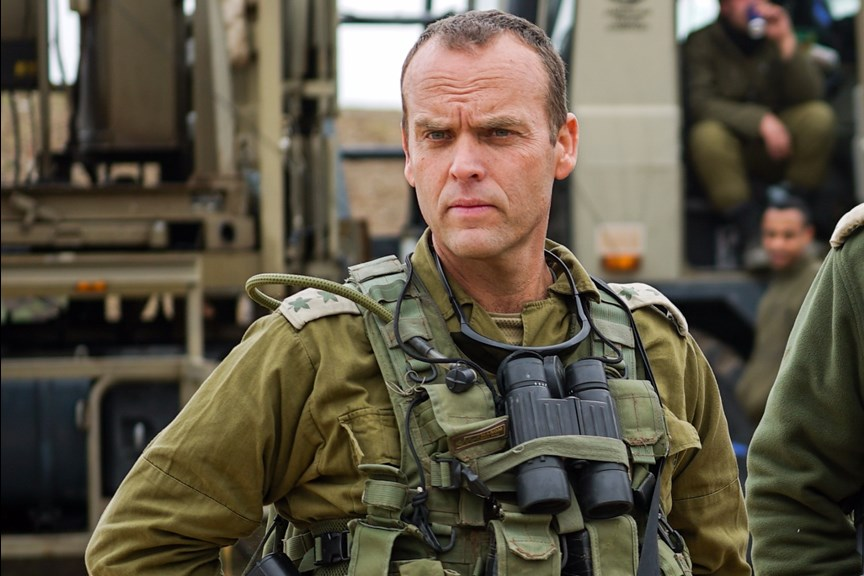
- Binder in 2017, when he was Aluf Mishne (equivalent to Colonel)
- Born: February 1975 (age 51); Haifa, Israel
- Military career
- Allegiance: Israel
- Branch: Israel Defense Forces
- Service years: 1993–present
- Rank: Major General (Aluf)
- Unit: Military Intelligence Directorate (Israel)
- Commands: Head of the Military Intelligence Directorate (Israel)
- Conflicts: South Lebanon conflict (1985–2000); Second Intifada; 2006 Lebanon War; Operation Cast Lead; Operation Pillar of Defense; Operation Protective Edge; Operation Guardian of the Walls; Gaza war; 2026 Israeli–United States strikes on Iran

Shlomi Binder (Hebrew: שלומי בינדר; February 1975) is an IDF officer at the rank of Aluf (equivalent to major general), who serves as the Head of the Military Intelligence Directorate (Aman). Previously, he served, among other positions, as the Head of the Operations Division in the IDF Operations Directorate, commander of the Galilee (91st) Division, commander of the Golani Brigade, the commander of Sayeret Matkal, and the commander of Egoz Unit.

== Biography ==
Binder was born, raised, and educated in Haifa. In his youth, he studied at the Leo Beck High School in his hometown and was a member and guide of the Scout Movement.

After a year of service in the Golan Heights, he enlisted in the IDF in November 1993 and volunteered for Sayeret Matkal. After completing paratroopers' basic training, he underwent fighter training in the unit and then attended an infantry officers' course. Upon completing the course, he returned to the unit and was appointed team commander. He participated in combat in Southern Lebanon. In 1999, he was severely injured by an explosive device during a training exercise. After several months of recovery, he returned to service in the unit. He later served as a company commander and led several operations during the Second Lebanon War. He was then appointed as the deputy commander of the unit. In 2010, he was promoted to the rank of Lieutenant Colonel and appointed as the commander of the Egoz Unit, serving in this role until July 15, 2012. He later served in a General Staff role between 2012 and 2013.

On May 21, 2013, he was appointed as the commander of Sayeret Matkal, and on May 23, he was promoted to the rank of colonel. He led the unit in Operation Protective Edge, among other operations, for which the unit received a commendation from the Chief of General Staff. He served in this position until March 16, 2016. At the end of his term, the unit received an additional commendation from the Chief of General Staff for operations conducted during his command. On September 4, 2016, he was appointed as the commander of the Golani Brigade and served in this role until May 24, 2018. After completing his term, he took a year of study in Washington, D.C., USA.

On August 5, 2019, he was promoted to the rank of Brigadier General and on August 12, entered his role as the commander of the Galilee Formation, serving in this position until April 26, 2022. On October 3, 2022, he was appointed as the head of the Operations Division.

On May 2, 2024, it was agreed by the Minister of Defense and the Chief of General Staff that Binder would be appointed as the head of the Intelligence Directorate and promoted to the rank of major general. He assumed his office on August 21, 2024.

== Personal life ==
Binder is married to Yael and they have three children. He resides in Ma'ale Gamla, a moshav on the Golan Heights. He earned a bachelor's degree in agronomy from the Hebrew University of Jerusalem and a master's degree in strategy from the National Defense University in Washington, D.C.
