= Daniel Gold =

Israeli military personnel

- דני גולד
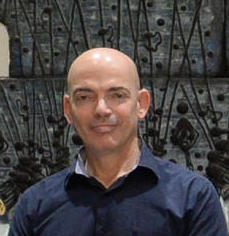
- Gold in 2018

Personal details
- Born: 1962 (age 63–64) Tel Aviv, Israel
- Nickname: Danny

Military service
- Allegiance: Israel
- Branch/service: Israel Defense Forces
- Rank: Tat Aluf
- Commands: Administration for the Development of Weapons and Technological Infrastructure

Daniel "Danny" Gold (Hebrew: דניאל "דני" גולד; born in 1962) is an Israeli military leader. He was appointed head of the Israeli Directorate of Defense Research & Development (DDR&D) and a Tat Aluf (Brigadier General) in the Israel Defense Forces in 2016. Additionally, he serves as the head of the National Technological Center for Combatting the COVID-19 pandemic at the Israeli Ministry of Defense.

== Biography and career ==
Danny Gold was born and raised in Tel Aviv. His parents, Aviva and Avraham, were Holocaust survivors who immigrated to Israel from Hungary. He completed his studies in Electronic Engineering at the Technion and in 1983 began his service in the Israeli Air Force, where he held positions in electronics, munitions, and electronic warfare. He later served in the DDR&D in various roles, including head of the Electronic Warfare Systems Department and head of the Research and Development Unit.

Among his notable contributions was the development of the Iron Dome missile defense system, which he worked on even before the project's approval. This work of his was originally critiqued by the states comptroller. For his work, he received the Israel Defense Prize in September 2012. In 2014, he completed his service in the IDF with the rank of Brigadier General and founded the company "Gold Technology and Entrepreneurship".

In April 2016 he was appointed as the head of DDR&D.

In March 2020 he established the National Technological Center for Combatting the COVID-19 pandemic in collaboration with the Ministry of Defense, the defense industry, the local tech industry, the IDF, and academic institutions, in cooperation with the Ministry of Health, hospitals, the National Health Insurance, the Mossad, and other entities, to find solutions related to the virus in various fields. The teams that were formed implemented a wide range of technologies.

In June 2014 he was awarded an Honorary Fellowship by the Ruppin Academic Center.

Gold holds two doctoral degrees from Tel Aviv University, in electronic engineering and business administration (specializing in technology management). In 2015, he was chosen to light a torch at the Independence Day Torch Lighting Ceremony.

== Personal life ==
Gold is married and a father of two.
