= Defense Establishment Comptroller Unit =

Israel Defense Forces unit

Defense Establishment Comptroller Unit (Hebrew: יחידת מבקר מערכת הביטחון) is an Israel Defense Forces unit which supervises and oversees the fitness, preparedness, and legality of the Israeli Security Forces' activities, in all its parts. It reports to the Minister of Defense, Director-general of the Ministry of Defense, and the Chief of Staff on these issues.

== History ==
The Defense Establishment Comptroller Unit was established in 1976. It was originally subordinate to what then the Operations Directorate (the most senior branch in the IDF). In 1994, it was placed under the deputy head of the Operations Directorate. In 2004, it was placed under the command of the Deputy Chief of Staff.

Unlike other IDF units, the Defense Establishment Comptroller Unit is headed by a civilian, who is one of three civilian members in the General Staff. In August 2002, the Defense Establishment Comptroller was Brigadier-General (Ret.) Yossi Beinhorn.
