= Moshe Kaplinsky =

Israeli general

- משה קפלינסקי
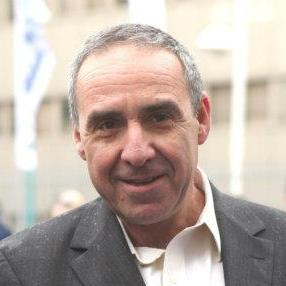
- Born: 20 January 1957 (age 69); Gedera, Israel
- Military career
- Allegiance: Israel
- Branch: Israel Defense Forces
- Service years: 1976–2008
- Rank: Aluf (Major General)
- Nickname: Kaplan
- Commands: Sayeret Golani (1982–1985), Golani Brigade (1993–1997), "Galilee" Territorial Division (1999–2001), Israeli Central Command (2002–2005), Deputy Chief of the General Staff, Israel Defense Forces (2005–2007)
- Conflicts: 1982 Lebanon War, 1982-2000 South Lebanon conflict, First Intifada, al-Aqsa Intifada

Maj. Gen. Moshe Kaplinsky (Hebrew: משה קפלינסקי; born January 20, 1957) is an Israeli army general and businessman who was CEO of the Israeli subsidiary of Better Place. Most recently, he was Deputy Chief of the General Staff of the Israel Defense Forces. He was previously head of the Israel Defense Forces's Central Command, whose area of responsibility includes the West Bank. As Deputy Chief of the General Staff he was second in command of the Israel Defense Forces.

== Education ==
Kaplinski has a BA in economics and business management from Bar-Ilan University and an MBA from Tel Aviv University. He is a graduate of the US Army's Advanced Infantry Officers Course (Fort Benning, Georgia).

== Career ==
In August 2002, he took over as chief of the Central Command from Major General Yitzhak Eitan. As head of Central Command, Kaplinski was an ex officio member of the IDF general staff; he oversaw, among other things, area commanders for the northern and southern parts of the West Bank (referred to as Samaria and Judea, respectively).

Kaplinski is a veteran of the Golani Brigade. His previous positions include:

- Military secretary to Prime Minister Ariel Sharon, promoted to Major General (2001–2002)
- Commander of the Galilee territorial division during the Israeli withdrawal from Lebanon *Commander of the Golani infantry brigade (1993–1995).

On December 8, 2006 Kaplinski told a meeting of mayors and local council leaders that Iran had a nuclear capability that would "threaten not only Israel, but all of Europe."
