= Tamir Yadai =

Israeli Major General

- תמיר ידעי
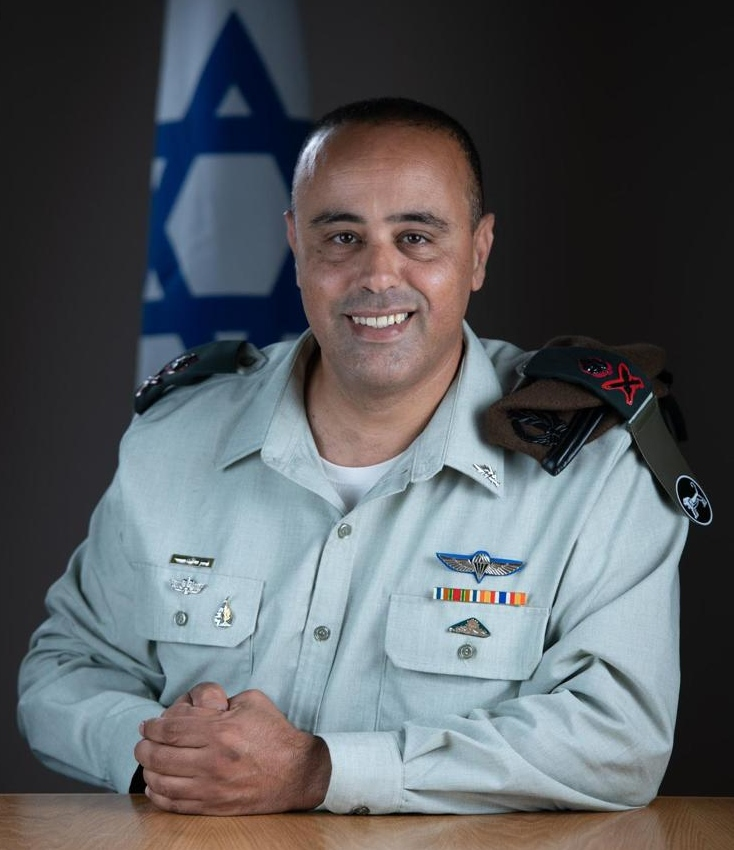
- Tamir Yadai
- Born: 16 December 1969 (age 56); Israel
- Military career
- Allegiance: Israel
- Branch: Israel Defense Forces
- Rank: Aluf
- Unit: Golani Brigade
- Conflicts: South Lebanon conflict (1985–2000); First Intifada; Second Intifada; 2006 Lebanon War; Operation Cast Lead; Operation Pillar of Defense; Operation Protective Edge; Operation Iron Swords; 2026 Israeli–United States strikes on Iran

Tamir Yadai (Hebrew: תמיר ידעי) is an Israeli major general (aluf) who is currently the Deputy Chief of General Staff of the Israel Defense Forces. He formerly commanded the Ground Forces Command, Central Command, Home Front Command, 80th Division, and Golani Brigade.

== Biography ==
Yadai joined the IDF in 1988 and was deployed in the 51st Battalion of the Golani Brigade. He graduated the officer training course as a combat officer and infantry commander. Afterwards he returned to the 51st Battalion and was assigned as a platoon commander. Subsequently, he was assigned to be a company commander in the 51st Battalion. He was then appointed Lieutenant Commander of the 12th Battalion. He later served as an officer of the Golani Brigade. He was then appointed Chief of staff to the IDF Deputy Chief of Staff, Shaul Mofaz.

On 1 March 1998, he was promoted to lieutenant colonel and appointed commander of the 13th Battalion. During the post, he led a force in the pursuit of a Hamas terrorist in the Hebron region, and was wounded in a collision. As a result of his injury, he was reassigned as the commander of the egoz unit in 2000, and led the unit to fight, in Operation Defensive Shield, including the siege and capture of the Muqata in Ramallah.

On 3 June 2002, he was promoted to Colonel and appointed commander of baram and served in the post until 2004. After graduation, he was appointed commander of the Golani Brigade on 4 September 2005, and commanded the division, among others, during the Second Lebanon War including Battle of Bint Jbeil, where the brigade fighters hit about 40 Hezbollah terrorists, and at the end of the battle he led the rescue of the eight killed from the 51st Battalion. Due to budgetary and operational constraints, he served until August 27, 2008.

After twenty years of service in the Golani Brigade, he left to study. On 1 July 2009, he was promoted to Brigadier General and appointed commander of the 80th Division. In August 2011, he commanded IDF and Israel Police counter terrorism forces who were summoned to the division, following a terrorist attack in southern Israel, in which 6 civilian police officers and a soldier were killed along with another 30 injured civilians.

On 4 April 2013, he was appointed Commander of the Yeshua Division, and commanded the division, in Operation "Return Brothers", in which position he served until 5 August 2015.

At the end of the position he left for academic studies. On 3 February 2017, he was promoted to the rank of Major General and on 5 February 2017 took up his position as commander of the Home Front Command, leading it during the first outbreak of the coronavirus in Israel.

Yadai was appointed to serve as Commander of the Central Command in July 2020. In October 2021, he was appointed as commander of the Ground Forces Command.

In 2025, Yadai was one of three candidates to replace Herzi Halevi as Chief of the General Staff but was ultimately not chosen. He was reportedly a leading candidate for Deputy Chief of General Staff. He was ultimately chosen for the role.
