= Personnel Directorate =

Human resources branch of the Israel Defense Forces

- אגף כוח אדם
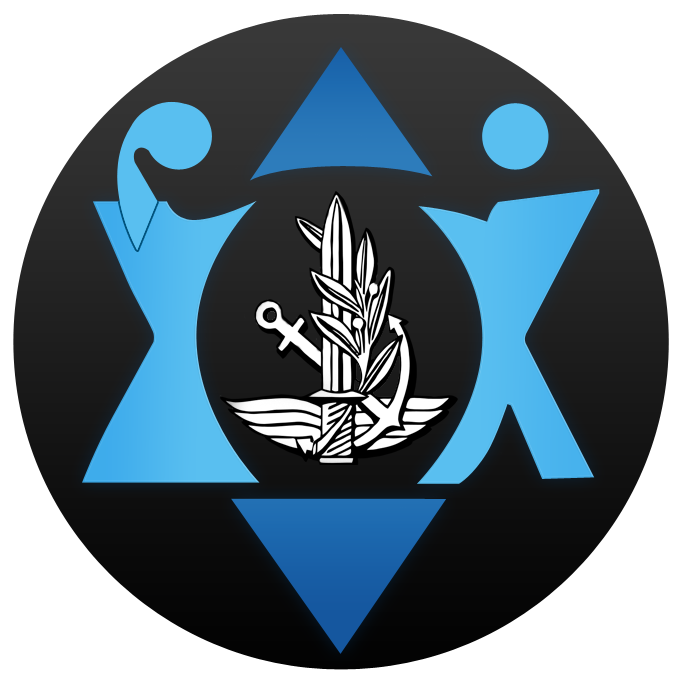
- Active: 1947–present
- Country: Israel
- Allegiance: Israel Defense Forces

Commanders
- Current commander: Aluf Dado Bar Kalifa

Insignia
- Flag

The Israeli Personnel Directorate (Hebrew: אגף כוח אדם, Agaf Koakh Adam, abbreviated to AKA), formerly called the Manpower Directorate and the Human Resources Directorate, is the Israel Defense Forces body that holds responsibility for planning and coordination of Human Resources placement and movement within the IDF, planning and management of all military Human Resources, and responsibility for the welfare of all service members. The current Head of the Personnel Directorate is Major General Dado Bar Kalifa.

== History ==
The Personnel Directorate was established with the forming of the IDF in 1948.

From 2004 to 2008, during Elazar Stern's tenure as head of the division, the division was called the Human Resources Directorate (Hebrew: אגף משאבי אנוש). In January 2006, the Adjutant Corps (Hebrew: חיל השלישות) was transferred from the division to the Land Force, as part of the process of merging the Adjutant Corps into the Land Force's Human Resources Division, decided upon by Chief of the General Staff, Dan Halutz.

During 2008, the Adjutant Corps was re-established within the Human Resources Directorate in accordance with the decision of the then Chief of the General Staff, Gabi Ashkenazi.

In July 2008, upon the assumption of office of Major General Avi Zamir, the division was renamed back to its previous name - the Personnel Directorate.

== Units and Corps ==
The Personnel Directorate has eight main corps and General Officer-level units directly subordinate to it, as well as numerous units and sub-units. The six main subordinates are:

- Military Police Corps
- Education and Youth Corps
- Human Resources Corps and Casualties Division
- Gender Advisor to the Chief of Defense Staff
- Staff Division and General Corps
- Human Resources Planning and Management Division
  - Meitav
- Welfare Division
  - MOFET
- Behavioral Science Center

== Commanders ==
Below are the historical commanders of the directorate. All of them finished their duties with the rank of Aluf, although some assumed the position with a lower rank. Includes pre-IDF Haganah commander Moshe Zadok.

- Moshe Zadok (May 1947 – 1949)
- Shimon Mazah (1949 – December 1952)
- Zvi Zur (December 1952 – February 1956)
- Gideon Shoken (February 1956 – April 1961)
- Aharon Doron (April 1961 – July 1963)
- Haim Ben David (July 1963 – July 1966)
- Shmuel Eyal (July 1966 – 1970)
- Shlomo Lahat (1970–1973)
- Herzl Shapir (1973 – April 1974)
- Moshe Gidron (April 1974 – 1976)
- Raphael Vardi (1976–1978)
- Moshe Nativ (1978–1983)
- Amos Yaron (1983–1985)
- Matan Vilnai (January 1986 – 1989)
- Ran Goren (1989–1992)
- Yoram Yair (1992–1995)
- Gideon Shefer (1995–1998)
- Yehuda Segev (1998–2001)
- Gil Regev (2001–2004)
- Elazar Stern (2004–2008)
- Avi Zamir (2008–2011)
- Orna Barbivai (2011–2014; first woman to receive the rank of Aluf and to head the Directorate)
- Hagai Topolanski (2014–2017)
- Moti Almoz (2017–2021)
- Yaniv Asor (2021–2024)
- Dado Bar Kalifa (2024–)
