= Dado Bar Kalifa =

Israeli general (born 1976)

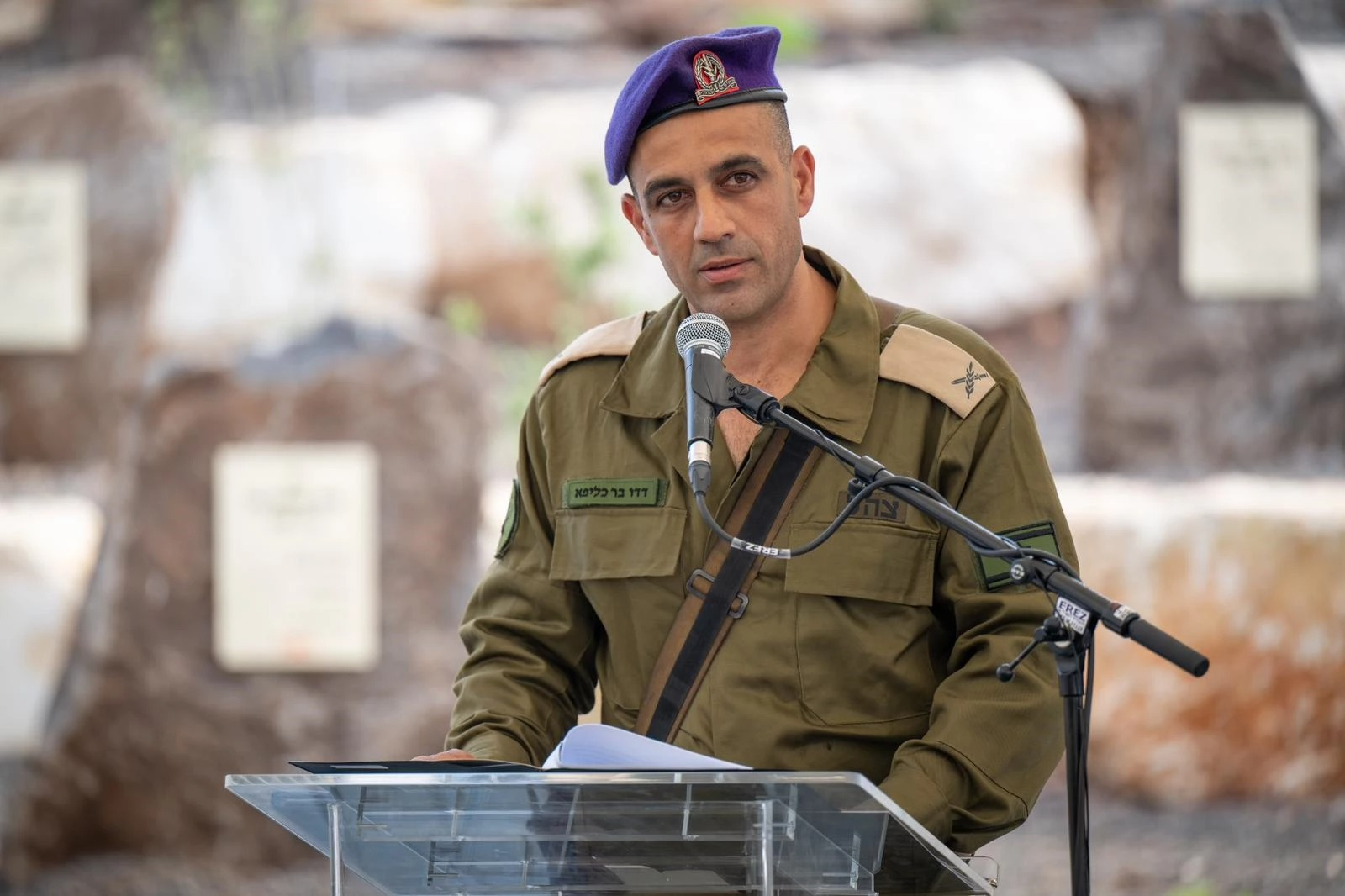
- Bar Kalifa in 2024
- Native name: דדו בר כליפא
- Born: 1976 (age 49–50); Kiryat Ono, Israel
- Allegiance: Israel
- Branch: Israel Defense Forces
- Service years: 1994–present
- Rank: Major general
- Commands: Givati Brigade; 252nd Division; 36th Division; Personnel Directorate; Military Advocate General (acting)
- Conflicts: South Lebanon conflict (1985–2000); Second Intifada; Gaza War (2008–2009); 2014 Gaza War; Gaza war; 7 October attacks

Dado Bar Kalifa (Hebrew: דדו בר כליפא; born 1976) is an Israeli military officer who has served as head of the Personnel Directorate of the Israel Defense Forces since 2024. He previously held several other senior roles, including commander of the Givati Brigade, commander of the 252nd Division, commander of the 36th Division, and acting Military Advocate General. In August 2026, Israeli defense minister Israel Katz announced his intention to appoint Bar Kalifa as head of the IDF Central Command.

== Early life and education ==
Bar Kalifa was born in 1976 to Moroccan immigrants in Kiryat Ono and graduated from the National-Religious Education. He attended the Or Etzion boarding school in Merkaz Shapira, as well as the pre-army school in Peduel. He graduated from Ono Academic College with a bachelor's degree in business administration and from the University of Haifa with a master's in political science. He also graduated from the National Security College.

== Military career ==
He enlisted in the Israel Defense Forces (IDF) in 1994, joining the Golani Brigade's reconnaissance unit. After finishing an officers' course, he was appointed a squad commander in the brigade's anti-tank unit and partook in combat operations against Hezbollah in the IDF-designated "Security Zone" in occupied Southern Lebanon. Between 2000 and 2002, he was a company commander at Bahad 7. He was then appointed commander of the "Tzahar" battalion of the Givati Brigade, tasked with defending Netzarim. Due to his performance against Hamas, he was promoted to deputy commander of the Givati Brigade in 2003 by Col. Ofer Winter.

In May 2004, during the Second Intifada, he participated in an IDF raid on Zeitoun, southern Gaza City. While Israeli forces were withdrawing from the neighborhood, several Givati soldiers were killed in an anti-tank missile attack against their convoy. Shmuel Zakai, commander of the Gaza Division, ordered the IDF to remain in the area until the bodies of the slain soldiers were recovered, leading to a 40-hour operation that Bar Kalifa participated in. All of the bodies were recovered. He then engaged in academic studies until 2006, when he was appointed head of the training school for the Givati Brigade's reconnaissance unit for a year. After completing studies at the Inter-Services Command and Staff College, he was promoted to commander of the Shaked Battalion in 2008, being tasked to destroy militant strongholds in Tel al-Hawa during the Gaza War. Between 2010 and 2012, he served as head of the Givati Brigade's training base, before being appointed a liaison officer to the United States Marine Corps. He returned to Israel during the early days of the 2014 Gaza War, and in August of that year, was appointed commander of the Gaza Division's Southern Brigade, serving this role until he was succeeded by Col. Kobi Heller in August 2016.

Bar Kalifa then served as commander of the Givati Brigade. On 23 November 2017, while holding this command, he reprimanded a company commander and fired a squad commander over the killing of a Palestinian near Nabi Salih the month prior. These actions were criticized by Knesset member Ayman Odeh as too minor. In August 2019, he was promoted to brigadier general and appointed commander of the 252nd Division. In May 2022, he took command of the 36th Division. He participated in defending against the 7 October attacks in 2023, and subsequently oversaw his division through operations against Hamas in northern Gaza, including in Shuja'iyya.

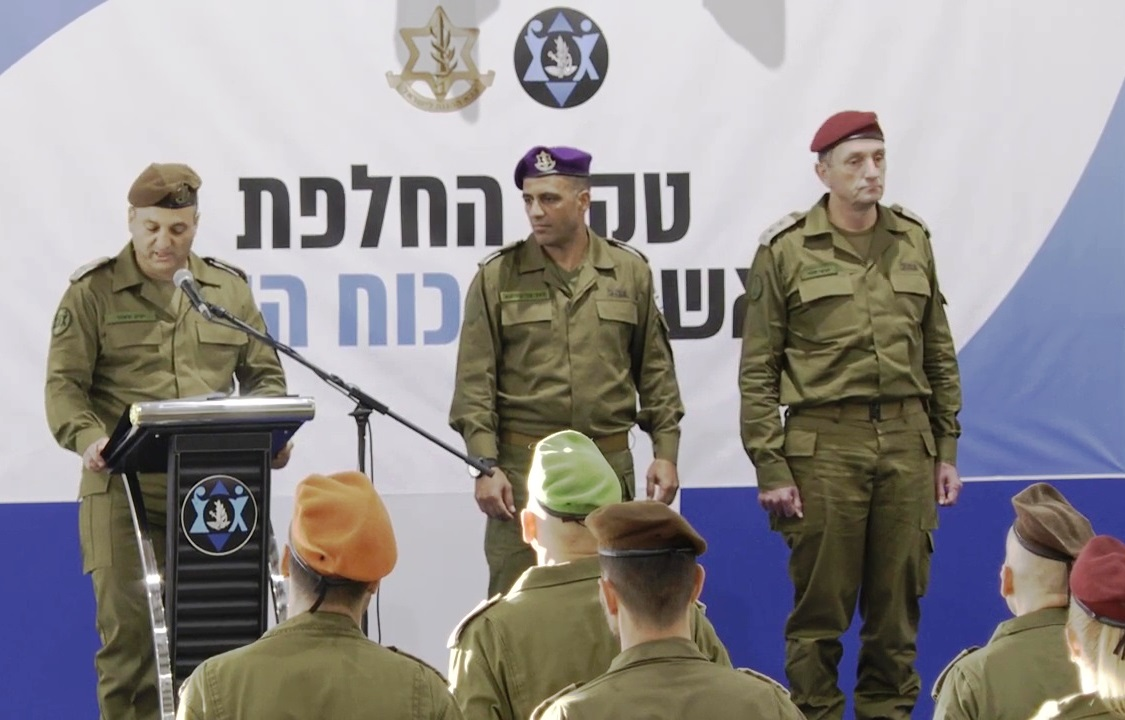
Bar Kalifa (center) at the Personnel Directorate change of command ceremony, 18 November 2024

In May 2024, he was chosen to lead the Personnel Directorate by Israeli defense minister Yoav Gallant and IDF chief of staff Herzi Halevi. He took command of the directorate and was promoted to major general following a military ceremony held at the HaKirya in Tel Aviv in October. On 17 September 2025, while addressing the Knesset, he warned that the IDF had a shortage of 12,000 soldiers, including 7,000 combat troops. In November, following the dismissal of Military Advocate General (MAG) Yifat Tomer-Yerushalmi, he was appointed acting head of the MAG until Itay Ofer, the designated successor, took office. On 20 July 2026, he criticized a mandatory military service extension approved by the Knesset, stating that it would not eliminate the manpower shortage and that new conscription laws were needed.

On 2 August, defense minister Israel Katz announced live on Channel 14 that he sought to appoint Bar Kalifa as head of the IDF Central Command, criticizing how the current commander, Avi Bluth, was handling Israeli settler violence in the West Bank, claiming that he was "overly harsh" against settler violence and neglected Palestinian political violence. Katz claimed that IDF chief of staff Eyal Zamir had recommended Bar Kalifa's appointment in April, although the IDF said that Katz's statement was not coordinated with Zamir and that Katz needed Zamir's approval for such a move. Katz had earlier interviewed Bar Kalifa in June and determined that he was suitable for the role. Katz had threatened to appoint Bar Kalifa the week prior after Bluth appealed Katz's decision not to extend a restraining order against Tal Yinon Dardik, a settler suspected of sexual violence against a Palestinian during an attack in the West Bank. Bar Kalifa was previously seen as a potential candidate to command the Military Intelligence Directorate.

On 31 August, the IDF announced that Bar Kalifa was chosen as the next head of the Central Command, starting his role in 2027.

== Personal life ==
He is married to Karin, a lawyer, and has five children. They live in Kfar Pines.
