= Avi Bluth =

Israeli Major General

Abraham Ahron Bluth
- אַבְרָהָם (אָבִי) אַהֲרֹן בְּלוּט
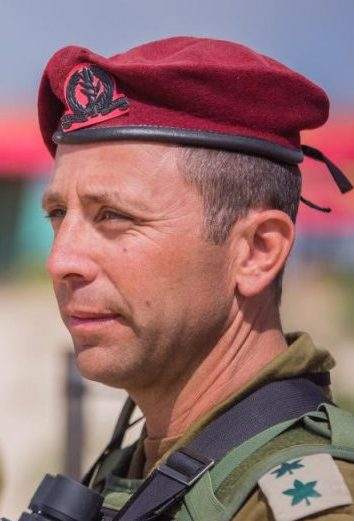
- Avi Bluth, July 2018
- Born: Israel
- Military career
- Allegiance: Israel
- Branch: Israel Defense Forces
- Service years: 1993–present
- Rank: Aluf (Major general)
- Nickname: Avi
- Commands: 101st "Peten" paratroop battalion; Maglan Unit; Judea Regional Brigade; Reserve Paratroopers Brigade; 89th Commando Brigade; Judea and Samaria Division
- Conflicts: South Lebanon conflict (1985–2000); First Intifada; Second Intifada; Operation Defensive Shield; 2006 Lebanon War; Operation Cast Lead; Operation Pillar of Defense; Operation Protective Edge

Abraham (Avi) Ahron Bluth (Hebrew: אַבְרָהָם (אָבִי) אַהֲרֹן בְּלוּט; born 1974) is an Israeli Major general (Aluf), who currently heads the Central Command.

Bluth is the chief officer in charge of the Israeli occupation of the West Bank.

== Biography and military service ==
Bluth was born in Jerusalem to Efraim and Shoshana. He lived in the West Bank settlement of Neve Tzuf. He was drafted into the IDF in 1993. He volunteered as a paratrooper in the Paratroopers Brigade, and in 1995 became an infantry officer after completing Officer Candidate School. Bluth served as a platoon leader at the 890 paratroop battalion and fought in South Lebanon. Later on he commanded the 101st "Peten" paratrooper battalion during Operation Cast Lead in which he was injured. Afterwards he commanded Maglan Unit. His next position was as the commander of the Judea Regional Brigade. Later on he commanded a reserve Paratroopers Brigade. In 2017, he was appointed as the commander of the 89th Commando Brigade and in 2018 he was chosen to be the next Military Secretary to the Prime Minister. While serving as the Military Secretary to the Prime Minister, he was reprimanded by the Chief of the General Staff, Gadi Eisenkot on 4 January 2019, for not delivering on time the Prime Minister's directive to delay the evacuation of Amona. In 2021, he was appointed as the commander of the Judea and Samaria Division.

On 20 June 2024, Bluth was promoted to the rank of Aluf (major general), and on 8 July 2024, he was appointed as the commander of the Central Command (Israel).

In August 2025 the Israeli NGO "Association for Civil Rights in Israel" (ACRI) requested the chief military advocats office to investigate Avi Bluth for possible war cimes. The general had announced in an interview that villages which were home to Palestinian "terrorists" would pay a heavy price and could be surrounded, subjected to a curfew or "landscape remodeling." After the interview, Bluths soldiers destroyed hundreds of trees in Palestinian orchards around the village al-Mughayyir. The NGO pointed out in its letter to Yifat Tomer-Yerushalmis office, that although there have been rights violations in the West Bank on a daily basis, this was the first time, that a General had publicly boasted about his troops participation.

On 2 August 2026, while Bluth was at a military briefing on the West Bank, Defence Minister Israel Katz announced his intention to replace him as Central Command chief with Dado Bar Kalifa over Bluth's objection to Katz refusing to renew an administrative detention order for an Israeli settler accused of sexual violence against a Palestinian in Khirbet Humsa al-Fawqa. Katz later backtracked on his statement after facing criticism from the IDF and members of the opposition, including former defense ministers Benny Gantz and Yoav Gallant.

== Awards and decorations ==
Avi Bluth was awarded three campaign ribbons for his service during three conflicts.

Second Lebanon War	South Lebanon Security Zone	Operation Protective Edge

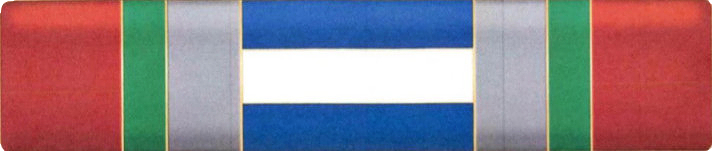

== Personal life ==
Bluth is married and has six children; he resides with his family in the Moshav Nehusha. He has a bachelor's degree in philosophy, economics, and political science from the Hebrew University of Jerusalem, and a master's degree in strategic thinking from the United States Army War College in Pennsylvania.
