= Chagai Topolanski =

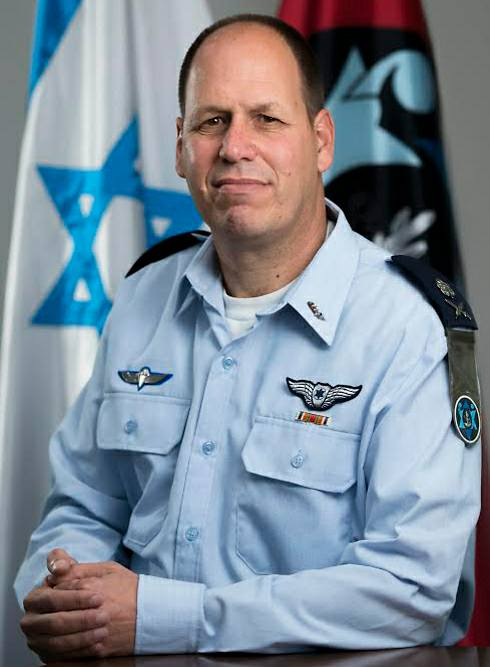
- Native name: חגי טופולנסקי
- Allegiance: Israel
- Education: University of Haifa; Air University

Chagai Topolanski is an Israel Defense Forces officer.

Topolansky graduated from the University of Haifa with a bachelor's degree in economics and management, before studying a master's degree in military strategy at Air University.

As head of the Personnel Directorate, Topolanski revised shaving regulations.

Topolanski was appointed the director general of the Israel Airports Authority in April 2022 by Merav Michaeli.
