= Nitzan Alon =

Israeli general (b. 1964)

- ניצן אלון
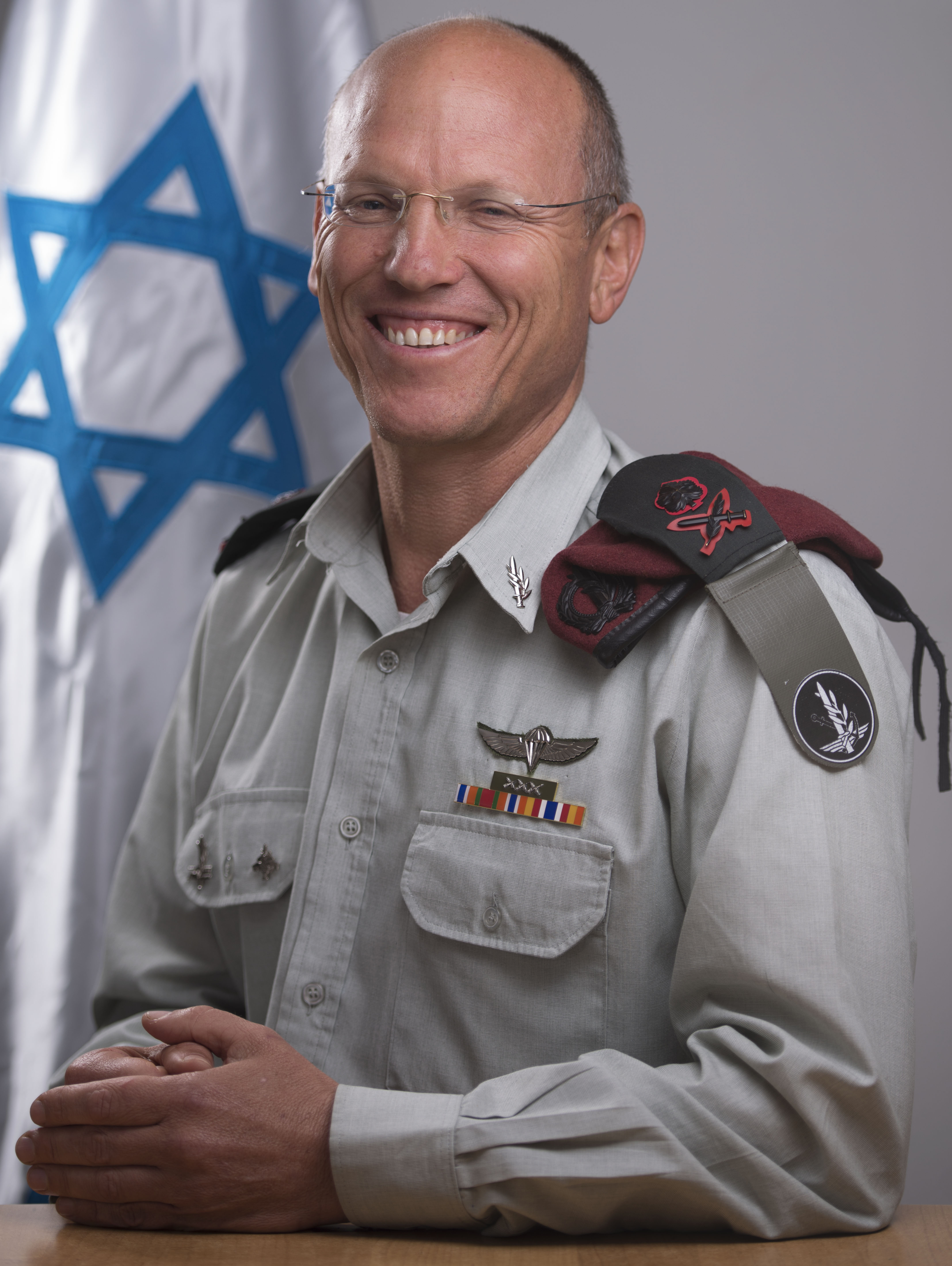
- Nitzan Alon, 2015
- Born: 26 February 1965 (age 61)
- Military career
- Allegiance: Israel
- Commands: Central Command

Major General Nitzan Alon (Hebrew: ניצן אלון; born 26 February 1965) is a retired Israeli general who served as Head of Central Command from 2012 to 2015 in the Israel Defense Forces.

== Early life and education ==
He studied at the Technion, obtaining a Bachelor's degree with a double major in Physics and Materials Engineering.

== Career ==
Between 1984 and 2001, Alon was assigned to various positions in the IDF elite General Staff Special Forces Sayeret Matkal, being appointed its commander in 1998, serving in that position until 2001. While commanding Sayeret Matkal, he was awarded the Chief of Staff Citation for a covert mission he commanded. In 2001, he began working as a research associate in Washington, D.C. In 2003, he was appointed as commander of the IDF 551st Brigade Hitzey HaEsh (Fire Arrows) and in 2005 as commander of the Etzyon Regional Brigade in the IDF Central Command. In 2007, he was appointed as Head of the Israel Defense Military Intelligence.

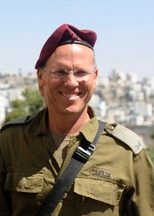
Alon in 2011

From 2009 until October 2011, he served as commander of the Judea and Samaria Division. In 2012, he became the new head of Central Command. The appointment was criticized by right-wing organisations and political figures, including representatives of the Jewish settlers in the West Bank. A spokesperson for the Mateh Binyamin Regional Council stated that Alon's appointment to head the IDF's Central Command "represents a certain aspect of 'price tag' on the part of the defense minister", but gave Alon credit for being "intelligent, wise and courageous", according to Arutz Sheva.

During his term as commander of the Judea and Samaria Division, Alon was harshly criticized by the Jewish settlers in the West Bank who claim that he is "stacked against the settler movement". In July 2011, settlers attacked his military jeep at Tapuah Junction, and protested outside his home, harassing him and his family. The Jerusalem Post called him "the most radical, politically insubordinate officer to have held the position in recent memory", claiming that he "went out of his way to demonize and attack Israeli residents of Judea and Samaria, [claiming] without evidence continuously ... that acts of vandalism against Arab property in Judea and Samaria and inside of the 1949 armistice lines is the work of Jewish residents of the areas".

At the end of his term as commander of the Judea and Samaria Division, Alon stated: "Even today an extremist minority, small in number but not in influence, could bring about a major escalation via acts that are dubbed 'price tag', but amount to terrorism. [These acts] should not just be condemned for their inherent injustice and stupidity; they must be stopped, and their perpetrators arrested, more effectively than we have succeeded in doing thus far". In an editorial, the Israeli daily Haaretz called his stance "supremely statesmanlike", and the proof "that not only is he a brave and decorated soldier, but he is also a man of conscience, who fears for the future of his society".

In October 2023, following the October 7 attacks, Alon was appointed as the IDF's Commander of the Intelligence Array for Locating the Abducted and Missing Persons. In that role, he served as one of a four-person delegation for negotiating a ceasefire and hostage release agreement. According to leaked reports, Alon had privately criticized the government headed by Netanyahu of hindering an agreement.

== Personal life ==
Alon is married to Mor Alon. The couple has four children.
