= Khalida Jarrar =

Palestinian politician (born 1963)

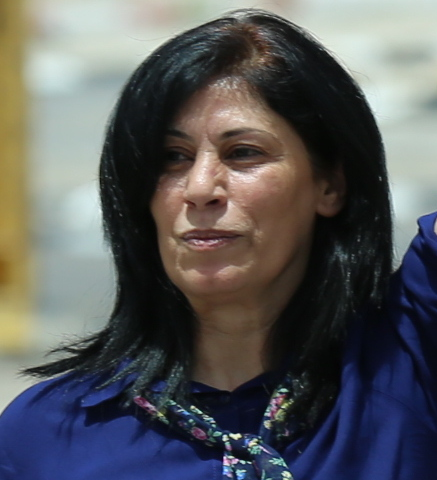

Member of the Palestinian Legislative Council
- Incumbent
- Assumed office 18 February 2006

Personal details
- Born: 9 February 1963 (age 63)
- Party: Popular Front for the Liberation of Palestine
- Spouse: Ghassan Jarrar

Khalida Jarrar (Arabic: خالدة جرار; born 9 February 1963) is a Palestinian politician. She is a member of the Popular Front for the Liberation of Palestine (PFLP) and the Palestinian Legislative Council (PLC). She was elected to the PLC in January 2006 as one of the PFLP's three deputies and has continued to serve as an elected representative ever since. She is also the Palestinian representative on the Council of Europe and is currently head of the Prisoners Committee of the PLC. She played a major role in Palestine's application to join the International Criminal Court.

She has been arrested multiple times by the Israeli authorities. Several of these arrests resulted in administrative detention without any charges being brought. She has also been charged with "incitement and involvement in terror" by an Israeli military court. The incitement charge refers to public statements she made in 2012 in which she criticized the Israeli occupation of the West Bank. The court sentenced her to 15 months in prison, of which she served 6, before being released after an international campaign on her behalf.

In March 2021, after having been held without charge since 2019, she was sentenced by an Israeli military court to two years in prison after a plea bargain, in which she declared herself guilty of membership in an organization, the PFLP, which Israel regards as a terrorist group. She went on record to state that her plea bargaining was due to the exhaustingly protracted nature of legal proceedings, lack of faith in Israel's military courts, and the threat of a 7-year sentence. She was released on 26 September 2021. She was rearrested in December 2023, following the outbreak of the Gaza war, and released in January 2025 as part of the 2025 Gaza war ceasefire.

== Family ==
Jarrar's father ran a toy-shop business in Nablus. In 1985, after a five-year engagement, and when she had completed her master's degree at Bir Zeit, Jarrar married Ghassan Jarrar, a fellow student, and now a manufacturer of children's furniture and toys at Beit Furik, a former political activist who has been arrested 14 times and spent 10–11 years without trial or charges being laid under administrative detention in Israeli prisons. The couple had three children: Yafa, with a degree in law from the University of Ottawa; Suha, with a master's of science degree in climate change science and policy; who grew up thinking soldiers pounding on one's doors, arrests and the imprisonment of parents was a normal part of children's lives; and a son, Wadia. The couple live in al-Bireh, Ramallah. In her six years of imprisonment, she has been refused leave to attend her father's funeral (2015), that of her mother (2018), and of her daughter Suha (2021) who died aged 31. On Suha's death from cardiac arrest in July 2021, Jarrar was denied a temporary release from her imprisonment on humanitarian grounds in order to attend her daughter's funeral. Her son Wadia died in 2024, aged 29, also of a heart attack while she was again under administrative detention.

== Career ==
Jarrar has been a human rights activist for many years. Her first of several arrests began on 8 March 1989 when she was detained for participating in a demonstration on International Women’s Day. She has been active for a number of years in support of Palestinian prisoners, and she served as the director of Addameer, a prisoners' support and human rights NGO in Ramallah, from 1993 to 2005 and remains a board member. She has also previously worked with UNRWA and has been prominently active in working with Palestinian women and advocating for women's rights.

Since 1998 Jarrar has been banned from traveling outside of the occupied Palestinian territories, after she attended the Human Rights Defenders' Summit in Paris that year. In 2005 the Israeli authorities refused to allow her to leave the country, the 6th such refusal since 2000, to attend a human rights conference in Ireland organized by Front Line Defenders, namely the "Third Dublin Platform for Human Rights Defenders", programmed to take place in Dublin in October 2005. At the time, she had never been charged with any criminal offence by the Israeli authorities. Since March 2006, she has been the PFLP's senior political leader, after the group's Secretary General Ahmad Sa'adat was arrested and placed in solitary confinement.

She was interviewed for the Goldstone Report by telephone in 2009 on the Gaza War (2008–09), after she was denied permission to leave the West Bank.

== Health ==
Jarrar has suffered from bouts of deep vein thrombosis, and her lawyer has expressed concern that appropriate medical care for her condition might not be available in an Israeli prison. In July 2010, Jarrar was informed by a doctor that tests indicated she needed an urgent brain scan to establish an exact neurological diagnosis. Since the medical equipment to make the diagnosis was not available in the West Bank, where she was then detained, she was informed that the PNA's Health Ministry would cover the costs of her hospitalization in Amman, but not in Israel. As a member of the Palestinian Legislative Council, expatriation for medical tests should, she was assured, could be arranged. An Israeli official for the Civil Administration of the West Bank said there was no security threat were she to be treated in Jordan. On August 29, she was denied transit to Jordan via the Allenby Bridge, and Shin Bet stated that she was a security threat to the region. Former European Parliament vice president Luisa Morgantini called on the European Parliament to intervene by requesting that Israel allow Jarrar to go to Amman for the necessary medical treatment. Subsequently, she was allowed, later that year, to travel to Amman for treatment.

== Expulsion order ==
On 20 August 2014, approximately 50 Israeli soldiers surrounded Jarrar's home in Ramallah, and an Israeli officer gave her an expulsion order stating she was a threat to the security of the region and was to leave her home of residence, Ramallah, and transfer to the district of Jericho where she was to live under a restricted movement protocol for six months. The order was to be considered immediately effective. She rejected the order, stating: "it is the occupation who must leave our homeland." Ramallah, according to the Oslo Accords, is located in Area A, and under complete Palestinian jurisdiction. Jarrar refused to sign the order.

Jarrar made an appeal against the decision to an Israeli court, which reduced the restriction period from 6 to 1 month. But Jarrar actually never left Ramallah. According to a left-wing columnist of the Israeli newspaper Haaretz, her refusal to be deported lead to her arrest in April 2015.

== Administrative detention, trial and conviction ==
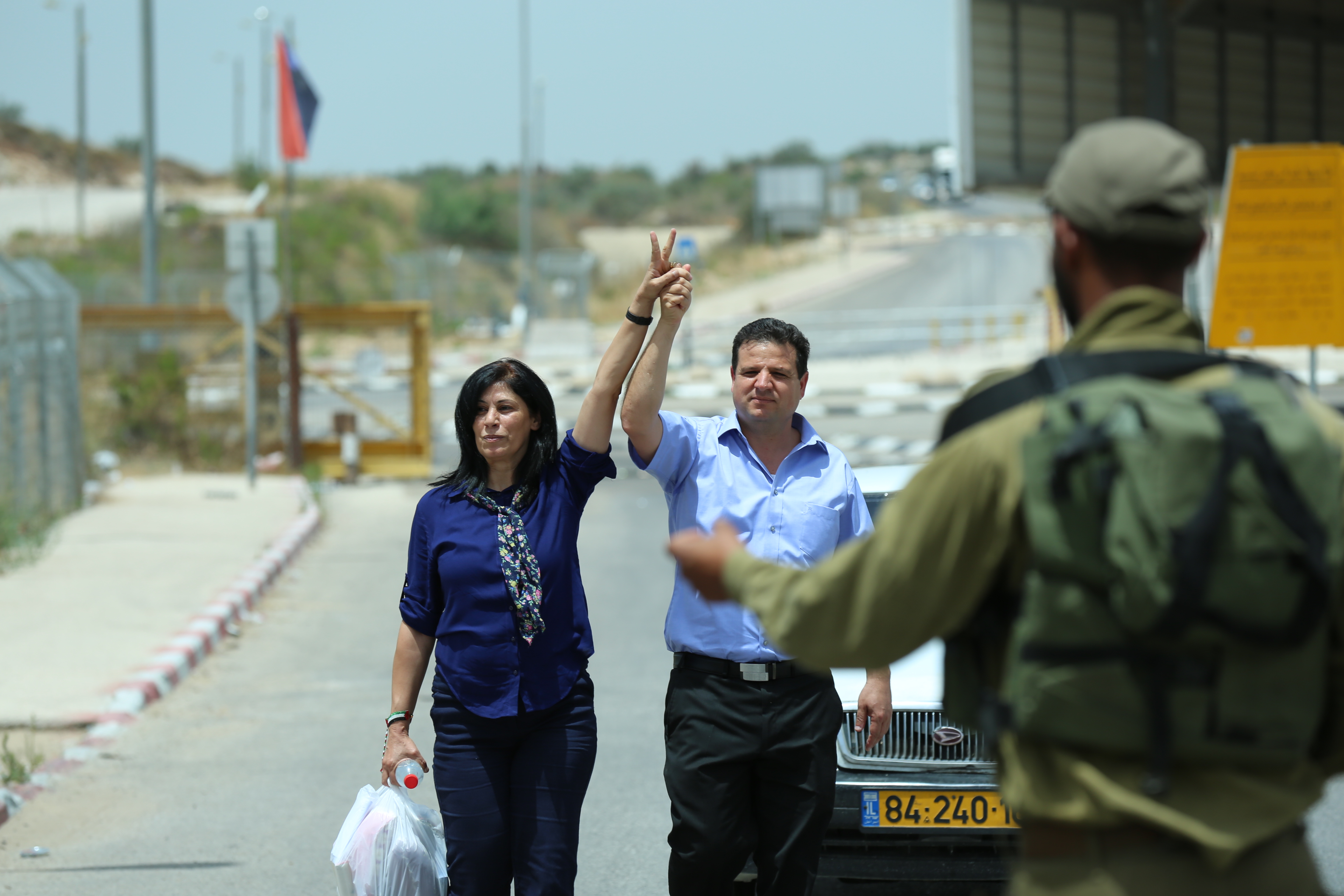
Palestinian parliament member Khalida Jarrar with MK Ayman Odeh, Head of the Joint List, after the Israeli authorities released her, 2016

On 2 April 2015, at around 1:15 a.m., Jarrar was arrested at her home by Israeli soldiers. Her husband says that a unit of 50–60 soldiers smashed the front gate and broke into the house, but otherwise did not act violently. No reason was given him for the arrest, though a commander, a Captain Yihye, said she had flouted an earlier army order to leave her home. Soldiers tried to prevent the husband and wife from embracing as she left, but Yihye intervened to allow them to do so. One of their daughters was found by her father bound by plastic handcuffs, after Khalida was taken away. According to the arrest warrant, Jarrar was involved in 'incitement and involvement in terror.' She was incarcerated in HaSharon prison. Two computers and a mobile phone were confiscated. A six-month administrative detention, which can be renewed indefinitely, was issued against her by Central Command Chief Gen. Roni Numa and was reviewed by a military court on April 8, where it was confirmed, despite international protests. Her detention without trial was condemned by Israel's Haaretz newspaper, which argued that Israel at times adopts the procedure excessively. Though international humanitarian law does accept administrative detention in exceptional cases and only as a last resort, human rights groups argue that Israel, which claims the detentions thwart militant attacks, exceeds the limits by its extensive recourse to the practice.

Israel's Palestinian Arab MK’s, including Ahmad Tibi, called for her immediate release, and Aida Touma-Suleiman called it 'a political detention of an elected official who is opposed to the occupation.' A Palestinian prisoner advocate who tracks the welfare of Palestinian prisoners, Kaddoura Fares, said the timing of the arrest aroused suspicions that Israel's measure against Jarrar was motivated by vindictiveness, given her role in monitoring International Criminal Court (ICC) procedures, and the fact that the order for her detention was implemented immediately after the Palestinian National Authority was accepted as a member of the ICC and was arrested just after the Palestinian Authority joined the ICC. Her husband also stated it may be a possible retaliation for Palestine's membership of the ICC. Amnesty International noted that Jarrar suffers from chronic health problems, with the prospect of facing indefinite detention without charge or trial. 58 Members of the European Parliament protested her arrest in an open letter to Federica Mogherini, stating that attempts to forcibly transfer a person under occupation, to which she was subject in August 2014, constituted a violation of the Fourth Geneva Convention. Haaretz stated at the time of her arrest:

'If Jarrar broke the law, Israel must put her on trial and prove she committed a crime. If, on the other hand, the reason for her detention is revenge, she must be released immediately.'

Her administrative detention led to formal imprisonment pending a trial, which began with a closed session on April 15, at a military criminal court at Ofer Prison where the prosecutor at the Israeli military court laid 12 charges against her, based on her association with the PFLP, including membership of an organization Israel classifies as illegal; participation in protests, and incitement to kidnap Israeli soldiers. Several counts refer to her having given interviews, speeches and lectures, participating in marches and a politicized book fair, calling for Palestinian prisoners to be released, and opposing the Israeli occupation. The indictment also spoke of suspicions she had visited the homes of prisoners’ families, and of having attended a book fair, of calling for the release of Ahmad Saadat, a leader of the Popular Front for the Liberation of Palestine.

Haaretz has called the trials "a Kafkaesque perversion of military law". According to Addameer, the presiding judge confirmed the administrative detention order, which means she could be released on bail. A date of 29 April was set for a judicial review of the charges, in a hearing that would determine if she was to be detained on remand until the end of her trial. If it was decided that she will be remanded, the administrative detention order would be cancelled. If she was not remanded, the order for her administrative detention would be reviewed on 6 May 2015. On April 26, a Haaretz editorial argued that the Military Advocate General had decided to press terrorist charges against her only after her arbitrary detention aroused international criticism and that a suspicion exists was that the trial was payback for her involvement in Palestine's successful entry into the ICC. The Editorial noted that the arrest of a democratically elected official in violation of her parliamentary immunity, by Israeli forces inside territory under full Palestinian jurisdiction, had been generally ignored by the Israeli media, had stirred almost no protests by women's groups on behalf of a female activist, and no significant move by her counterparts in the Israeli Knesset. She was the only female detained under Israel's administrative detention policy, and joined a further 16 Palestinian lawmakers already imprisoned without trial under the same administrative detention measure, along with 450 administrative detainees held in prison with no legal process, 319 of which were served with administrative detention orders in the first 4 months of 2015, six times higher than the number for the preceding year, according to the Palestinian Prisoners Centre for Studies.

On 21 May 2015, the court ruled Jarrar was to be released to house arrest. She was also fined $5,180. Amnesty International, which stated she had been brought to stand trial with her legs in shackles, said that the judge had ruled that the prosecution's case was based on insufficient and dated evidence. The prosecution was given 3 days to appeal the decision. The prosecution then appealed the decision to release her on bail, and the court reversed the ruling on May 28, stating Jarrar was a "security risk" on the basis of secret evidence, according to Addameer The court ordered that she be held in detention until proceedings against her have concluded. Her trial was scheduled for June 22. If convicted she faced a prison term of up to 2 years.

By November 2015, Jarrar was still under arrest, in what her attorney called "a circus, a charade". Witnesses who had been asked to identify Jarrar had been presented with pictures of 7 people, where only one person, Ms. Jarrar, was female.

On December 6, 2015, Jarrar received a 15-month jail sentence for belonging to an illegal organization and "incitement", with a suspended sentence of a year within a five-year period. She was also fined $2,582, and released on June 3, 2016.

On 2 July 2017, Jarrar was again detained by the Israeli security apparatus for an alleged offense related to national security.

In June 2018, her detention was extended for another four months, while any info about charges against her remains confidential, which was again renewed until 28 February 2019. She was being held in Damon Prison.

She was released on 28 February 2019, after 20 months in administrative detention without any charge or trial made against her.

In late October 2019, she was again arrested, as 70 Israeli soldiers surrounded her house in Ramallah at 03.00 AM. According to Israeli military sources, she was arrested "in suspicion of being involved in activities which jeopardize the security in the area"; the indictment reads, "...holding a position in an illegal association." The Israeli Military court sentenced her to further administrative detention. Jarrar was subsequently convicted as part of a plea bargain, began serving two years in prison in March, 2021, and was released after finishing her sentence in September of that year.

=== 2023 detention and 2025 release ===
On 26 December 2023, Jarrar was arrested for the fifth time. Her husband was beaten with rifle butts, and threatened with death when one soldier stated that he had tried to defend himself by reaching for a rifle. She was sent, under administrative detention, to Damon Prison, by Mount Carmel. In early August, without informing her family; still requiring medication, she was incarcerated in a windowless cell measuring 2.5 x 1.5 meters at Neve Tirza and was kept in solitary confinement. According to Gideon Levy, it was furnished with a bed of concrete with a thin mattress, and a mainly unflushed toilet. She reportedly lay on the floor to breathe through a crack beneath her cell door in an attempt to get fresh air. She asked her lawyer to help secure conditions that would allow her to breathe, as she was suffocating. On 24 June, her six-month administrative detention order was renewed.

On 19 January 2025, Jarrar was released as part of the 2025 Gaza war ceasefire.

== See also ==
- Jarrar family
