= Jenin Brigade =

Jenin Brigade may refer to:

- Menashe Territorial Brigade, an IDF brigade in the West Bank
- Jenin Brigades, a Palestinian armed group
