= Nativ =

Nativ (Hebrew: נתיב—"path") may refer to:

== Organizations ==
- Nativ (conversion), a Military Rabbinate program to help Israeli Defense Forces soldiers convert to Judaism
- Nativ (liaison bureau), Israeli government organization that encouraged aliyah from the Eastern Bloc
- Nativ (periodical), Israeli journal published by the Ariel Center for Policy Research
- Nateev Express, a long-distance public transportation company in Israel
- Nativ College Leadership Program in Israel, a gap-year program of Conservative Judaism in Israel

== People ==
- Nissan Nativ (1922–2008), Israeli actor
- Moshe Nativ (1932–2008), Israeli major general

== Other ==
- RTV-A-3 NATIV, American rocket
