= Gadi Shamni =

- גדי שמני
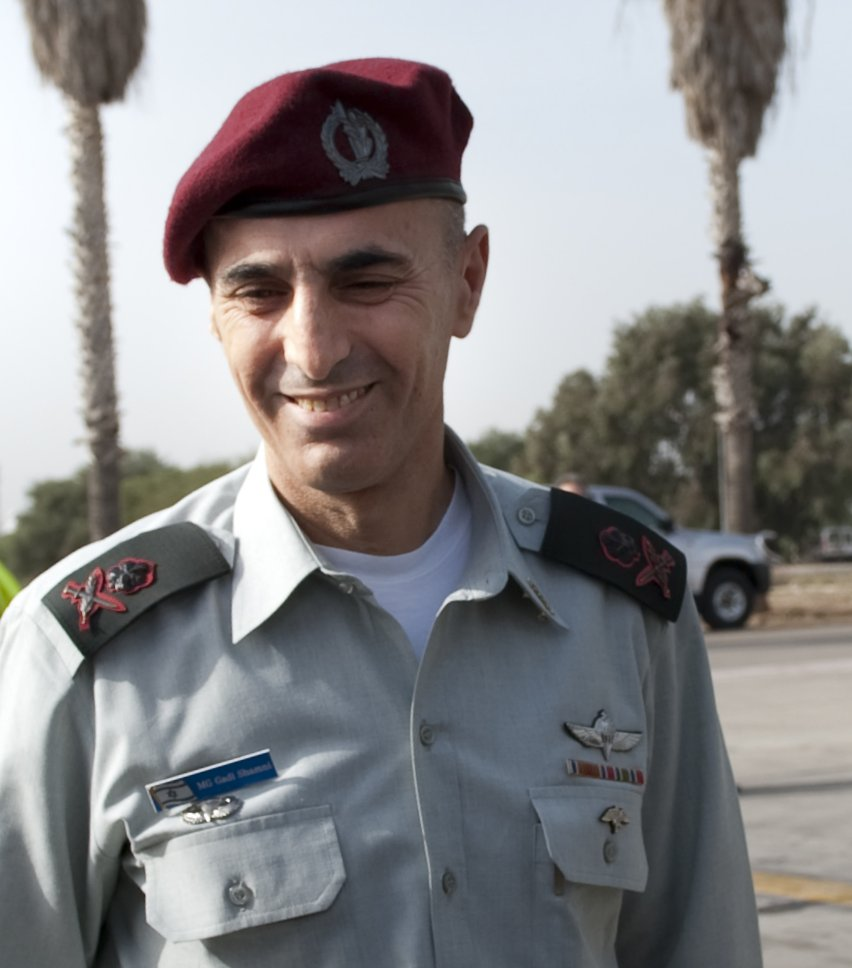
- Born: 1959 (age 66–67); Jerusalem, Israel
- Military career
- Allegiance: Israel
- Service years: 1977–2013
- Rank: Aluf
- Commands: Paratroopers Brigade, Infantry Corps, Gaza Division, Central Command
- Conflicts: First Lebanon War, Second Lebanon War

Mr. Gadi Shamni (Hebrew: גדי שמני; born 1959) is a retired general in the Israel Defense Forces and formerly Israel's military attaché in the United States, IDF central command commander and the military secretary to prime ministers Ariel Sharon and Ehud Olmert.

In 1977, Shamni was drafted into the Paratroopers Brigade, in which he stayed for much of his early career. Shamni was a company commander during the first Lebanon war in 1982, he commanded the paratroopers reconnaissance unit (Sayeret Hatsanhanim), commanded a paratroopers battalion, the regional brigade of Hebron and a reserve brigade. In 1999 he became the paratroopers brigade commander. In 2001, he was promoted to brigadier general and became the chief of infantry. In 2003, he was nominated to be the commanding general of the Gaza Division, and in 2004, he was the head of the operations division in IDF headquarters. In 2005, he was promoted to the rank of major general when he became the Military Secretary to the Prime Minister Ariel Sharon. In May 2007, Shamni was appointed head of Central Command, replacing Yair Nave. In October 2009, he became Israel's military attaché in the United States. He retired from the military in 2013 ending 36 years of service in the IDF. after retirement Shamni joined the civilian market. He was a Vice President for Land Systems in Israel Aerospace Industries (IAI) from 2015 to 2018. in the beginning of 2019 he was nominated as an Executive Vice President for North America in ICTS Europe (https://www.ictseurope.com/) a French owned company and a key player in the aviation security worldwide.

In 1984, Shamni graduated the US special Forces Q course in Fort Bragg, North Carolina. He studied at the IDF Command and Staff College and graduated the United States Army War College class of 1994. Shamni has received a BA in Economics and Political Science and an MA in National Security.

== Personal life ==
Shamni is married to Hadas and they have four children and three granddaughters.
