= 98th Paratroopers Division =

Israeli military unit

98th Division "HaEsh"
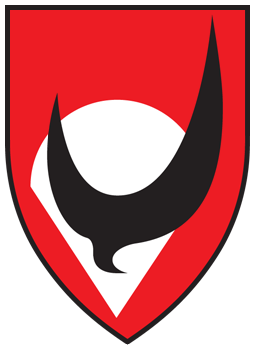
- Active: 1974 – present
- Country: Israel
- Branch: Israeli Ground Forces
- Type: Elite Paratrooper and Special Forces Division
- Size: Division
- Part of: Central Command
- Garrison/HQ: Bilu Camp
- Engagements: 1982 Lebanon War; 2006 Lebanon War; 2014 Gaza War; Gaza war; Israel–Hezbollah conflict; 2024 Israeli invasion of Lebanon

Commanders
- Current commander: Guy Levy
- Notable commanders: Dan Goldfuss; Dan Shomron; Tal Russo; Aviv Kochavi

The 98th Division "HaEsh" (Hebrew: עֻצְבַּת הָאֵשׁ, Utzbat HaEsh, lit. The Fire Formation), is an elite division of the Israel Defense Forces. It is subordinate to the Central Command. In October 2024 it took part in a ground operation in Lebanon.

== Division organization ==
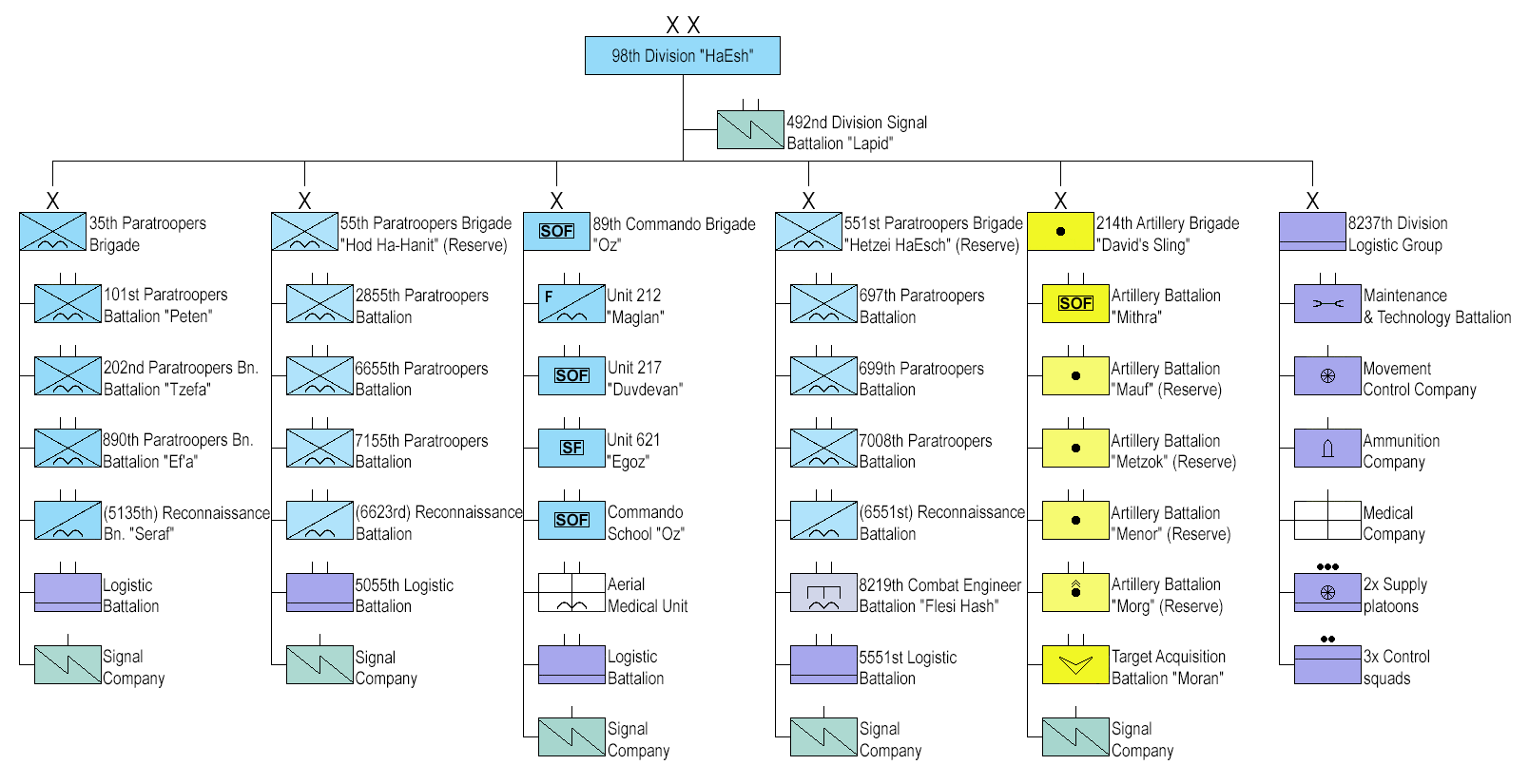
98th Division "HaEsh" organization as of November 2026

- 98th Division "HaEsh" ("Fire")
  - 35th Paratroopers Brigade
    - 101st Paratroopers Battalion "Peten"
    - 202nd Paratroopers Battalion "Tzefa"
    - 890th Paratroopers Battalion "Ef'a"
    - (5135th) Reconnaissance Battalion "Seraf"
    - Logistic Battalion
    - Signal Company
  - 55th Paratroopers Brigade "Hod Ha-Hanit" ("Spearhead") (Reserve)
    - 2855th Paratroopers Battalion
    - 6655th Paratroopers Battalion
    - 7155th Paratroopers Battalion
    - (6623rd) Reconnaissance Battalion
    - 5055th Logistic Battalion
    - 7047th Signal Company
  - 89th Commando Brigade "Oz" ("Courage")
    - Unit 212 "Maglan"
    - Unit 217 "Duvdevan"
    - Unit 621 "Egoz"
    - Commando School "Oz"
    - 6212th Battalion (Unit 212 "Maglan" Reserve)
    - 6217th Battalion (Unit 217 "Duvdevan" Reserve)
    - Aerial Medical Unit
    - 5589th Logistic Battalion
    - Signal Company
  - 551st Paratroopers Brigade "Hetzei HaEsch" ("Arrows of Fire") (Reserve)
    - 697th Paratroopers Battalion
    - 699th Paratroopers Battalion
    - 5868th Paratroopers Battalion
    - 7008th Paratroopers Battalion
    - (6551st) Reconnaissance Battalion
    - 8219th Combat Engineer Battalion
    - 5551st Logistic Battalion
    - 5766th Signal Company
  - 214th Artillery Brigade "David's Sling"
    - Artillery Battalion "Mithra" (Special Forces)
    - Artillery Battalion "Mauf" (Reserve)
    - Artillery Battalion "Metzok" (Reserve)
    - Artillery Battalion "Menor" (Reserve)
    - Artillery Battalion "Morg" (Reserve)
    - Target Acquisition Battalion "Moran"
    - 7134th Precision-Guided Munitions School
    - Signal Company
  - 8237th Division Logistic Group
    - Maintenance & Technology Battalion
      - Maintenance Company A
      - Maintenance Company B
      - Assistance Company
    - Movement Control Company
    - Ammunition Company
    - Medical Company
    - 2x Supply platoons
    - 3x Control squads
  - 492nd Division Signal Battalion "Lapid"
  - 5515th Transport Unit (Special Operations Forces)
