= Roni Numa =

Israeli Major general (born 1967)

- רוני נומה
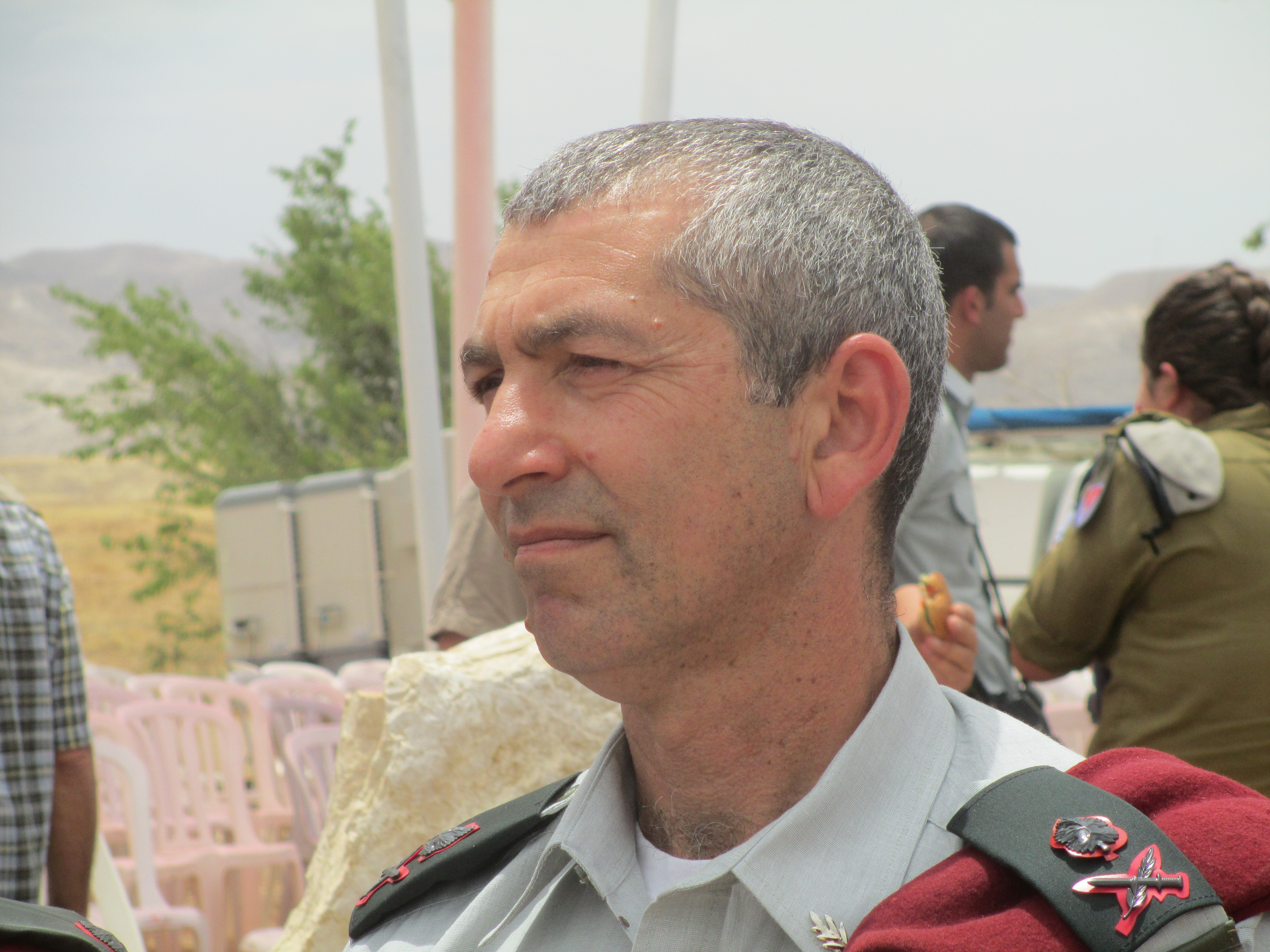
- Roni Numa.
- Born: Israel
- Military career
- Allegiance: Israel
- Branch: Israel Defense Forces
- Service years: 1983-
- Rank: Aluf (Major general)
- Unit: 35th Paratroopers Brigade
- Commands: Unit 217 'Duvdevan'; Unit 5101 'Shaldag'; 202 "Tsefa" (Viper) paratroop battalion Benjamin Regional Brigade; 933rd Brigade 'Nahal'; 98th Paratroopers Division; IDF's Central Command
- Conflicts: South Lebanon conflict (1985–2000); First Intifada; Second Intifada; 2006 Lebanon War; Operation Cast Lead; Operation Pillar of Defense; Operation Protective Edge

Roni Numa (Hebrew: רוני נומה; also known as Ronny Numa, born 1967) is an Israeli retired Major general (Aluf) who headed the Central Command of the Israel Defense Force from 2015 to 2018.

== Military service ==
Numa was drafted into the IDF in 1983. He volunteered as a paratrooper in the 35th Paratroopers Brigade, and in 1985 became an infantry officer after completing Officer Candidate School . Numa served as a platoon leader at the 890 paratroop battalion and fought in South Lebanon. later on he commanded Duvdevan Unit and Shaldag Unit. Numa Commanded 202 "Tsefa" (Viper) paratroop battalion during Operation Defensive Shield, and later on commanded the Benjamin Regional Brigade during the Second Intifada. Afterwards he commanded the Nahal Brigade. In the 2006 Lebanon War he served as an assistant to Gen. Dan Halutz. Later on he commanded the 98th Paratroopers Division, In 2015 he was appointed as the commander of the IDF's Central Command. His article called "To Win and Remain Human: Challenges of the Central Command during 2015-2016 Wave of Terror" was published in Dado Center Journal (The IDF Journal on Operational Art).

== Airport COVID commissioner ==
In June 2021, Numa was appointed by Prime Minister Naftali Bennett to the new position of Ben Gurion Airport's COVID commissioner. On August 30, Numa threatened to resign due to his "decisions and recommendations not being adopted in practice" by the government.
