= 2026 attack on Khirbet Humsa =

- Part of Israeli settler violence during the Gaza war
- Location: 32°15′53.38″N 35°26′12.98″E; Khirbet Humsa
- Date: March 13, 2026; 01:00 AM – 01:45 AM
- Target: Palestinian villagers and 2 foreign activists
- Attack type: beating, sexual assault, theft
- Weapons: wooden sticks, zip ties
- Injuries: 4+
- Perpetrator: Group of 20-40 Israeli settlers

On 13 March 2026, a group of Israeli settlers allegedly attacked the village of Khirbet Humsa in the West Bank, Palestine. According to residents, the settlers zip tied them, beat them, threatened them, and stole their sheep and other goods. Two foreign activists also reported being beaten in the attack. One settler was accused of committing sexual assault by cutting off a man's clothes and zip-tying his penis. After the Israel Defense Forces (IDF) detained one of the alleged assailants, settlers and right-wing politicians including Defense Minister Israel Katz criticized the IDF and campaigned for his release.

== Background ==
Since 2023, Israeli settlers have escalated their attacks on Palestinians in the West Bank with the intention of pressuring them to leave the area. As of 2026, the attacks were happening virtually every day. Settlers have increasingly used sexual assault as a tactic, which has been documented in a report by the West Bank Protection Consortium. The UN estimates that settlers have displaced at least 5,190 Palestinians between January 2023 and April 2026. Between January and mid-March of 2026, Israeli settlers killed approximately 7 Palestinians. Settlers rarely face legal consequences for their violence against Palestinians, and sometimes the Israeli police watch without interfering. Under Prime Minister Benjamin Netanyahu, Israel has expanded its settlements in the West Bank, which are illegal under international law. According to Israeli human rights group B’Tselem, Israel is attempting to ethnically cleanse the West Bank. Khirbet Humsa is one of the last remaining Bedouin villages in the northern part of the Jordan Valley.

== Attack ==
On 13 March 2026, around 1 AM, a group of 20-40 Israeli settlers allegedly attacked the Palestinian village of Khirbet Humsa with wooden sticks. According to residents, the settlers beat them, including children and two foreign activists from the International Solidarity Movement. The settlers allegedly tied their hands and feet with zip-ties and stole a flock of 400 sheep, jewelry, mobile phones, and money. Additionally, the settlers are accused of damaging property and dousing the residents in cold water. One settler allegedly sexually assaulted a villager by cutting his clothes off with a knife, zip-tying his penis, beating him on the ground, and parading him. According to one of the activists, the settlers threatened to kill her, saying: "This is our land; we’re Jewish". The residents stated that the settlers told them to leave Khirbet Humsa, otherwise: "we will burn you. We’ll hit you. We’ll take your children, and we will rape your women." The entire attack took about 45 minutes.

== Arrests ==
On 19 March, the Israeli police reported that they had arrested several settlers and were investigating the reported sexual assault and theft. The police later released a statement confirming Khirbet Humsa residents' accounts that a group of settlers had tied up, assaulted, and stolen from them on 13 March 2026. The police also stated that four of the residents needed medical treatment afterwards.

One of the alleged assailants, Tal Yinon Dardik, was issued an administrative detention order by IDF Major General Avi Bluth on 9 June, confining him to his mother-in-law's home in the settlement of Adei Ad. The order said that Dardik had "repeatedly engaged in violent activity against Palestinians and their property and encouraged others to carry out such acts". Dardik said he was innocent of the accusations. He stated that his mother-in-law objected to his presence and that he wanted to serve his house arrest in his home in the illegal outpost of Kfar Tarfon. After Dardik did not comply with the administrative dentention order, he was arrested in early July. While in jail, Dardik went on hunger strike for more than 20 days.

Settler activists and at least 13 right-wing politicians advocated for him to be freed including Defense Minister Israel Katz who visited him in prison. MK Limor Son Har-Melech criticised Bluth, stating that he allowed settlers to be "persecuted time and again, while Arab terrorism grew stronger". Honenu, a right-wing organization, is providing legal representation to Dardik and has said the allegations are false. Dardik's mother also said he is innocent and that he has established four Israeli outposts in the West Bank. In June or July, Channel 14 broadcast a segment about Dardik's detention which included video of the circumcision ceremony for his son. Towards the end of July, a Palestinian couple filed a legal petition claiming that the house in the video was theirs and that the IDF had not taken action against the armed settlers who had taken it over. On 3 August on live TV, Katz criticized Bluth for detaining Dardik and announced that Bluth would be replaced by Dado Bar Kalifa, stating that he wanted an IDF that "protects the settlers". He rescinded the announcement of Bluth's replacement after it was criticized by the IDF and political figures like Benny Gantz and Yoav Gallant.

According to Dardik, the June detention order was impossible for him to follow because his mother-in-law opposed his presence in her home. The courts upheld this claim in late July, and Katz prohibited the military from issuing an additional detention order. Dardik was released from jail in mid-August. According to the terms of his release, he was barred from the West Bank except for the Modiin Illit settlement where he was required to check in with police twice a day. In early September, he was arrested again for not following his release conditions.
