= Neve Tirtza Women's Prison =

Women's prison in Israel

Neve Tirtza Prison
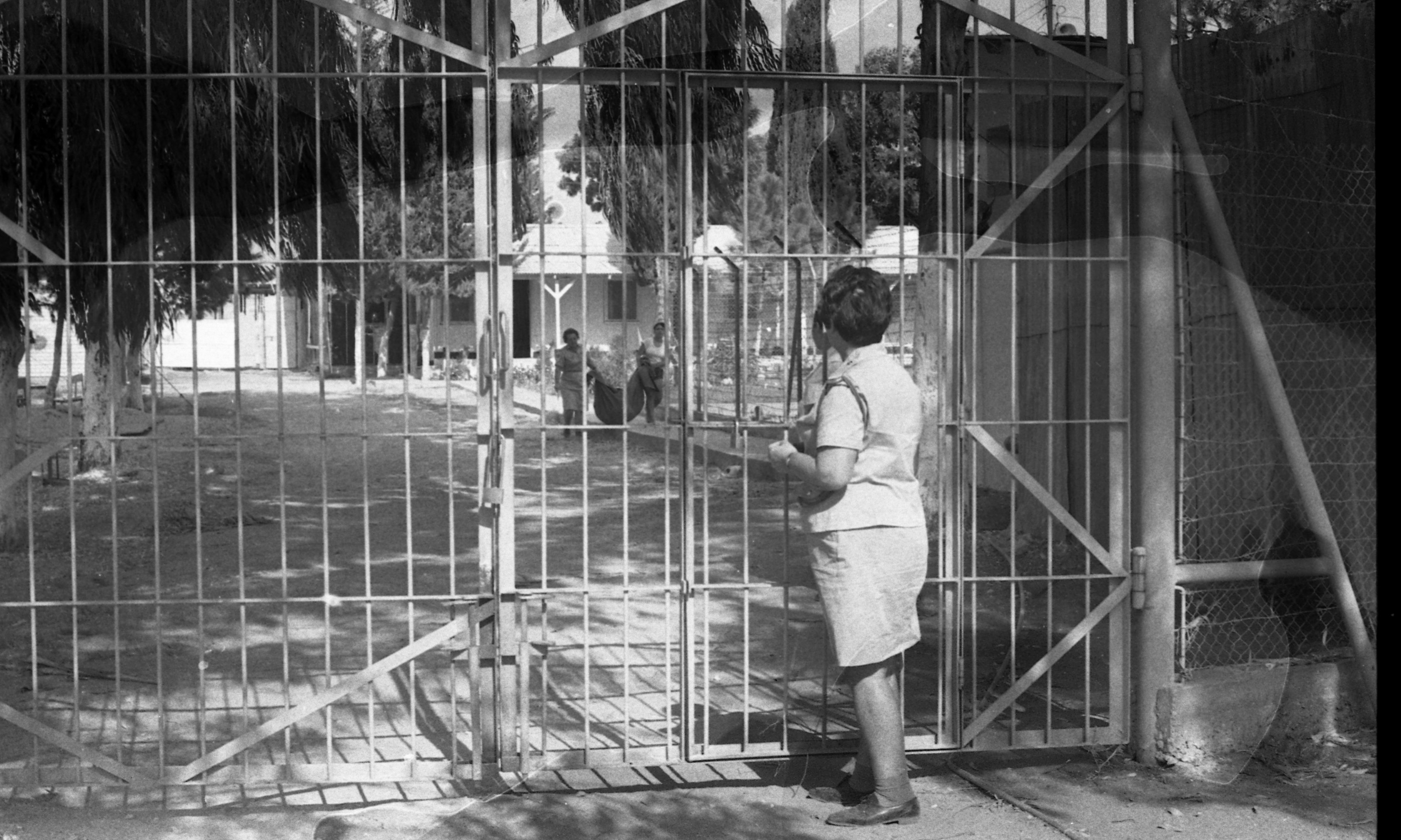
- Nive Tirtza, 1969
- Interactive map of Neve Tirtza Prison
- Location: Israel; 31.933728°N 34.881051°E

Neve Tirtza Prison (Hebrew: בית סוהר נווה תרצה) is Israel's only women's prison.

== History ==
Neve Tirtza opened in 1968. Before it opened, female prisoners were held in special women's wings of what were otherwise men's prisons. It is one of several prisons located in Ramla and is directly adjacent to Maasiyahu Prison. In 2019, there were 200 women incarcerated at Neve Tirtza.

== Protests and strikes ==
In 1970, a 9-day hunger strike was undertaken by Palestinians detained in Neve Tirtza over access to sanitary products.

In 1997, Palestinian prisoner Itaf Alayan, under administrative detention, undertook a 43-day hunger strike at the prison, one of the longest prisoner hunger strikes in the history of the Israeli-Palestinian Conflict.

In 2001, an 8-day hunger strike was undertaken by Palestinians detained in Neve Tirtza.

== Notable inmates ==
- Khalida Jarrar
- Rima Hassan
- Rochelle Manning

== See also ==
- Incarceration of women
- Israeli Prison Service
