= Nehemiah Tamari =

Israeli general

- נחמיה תמרי
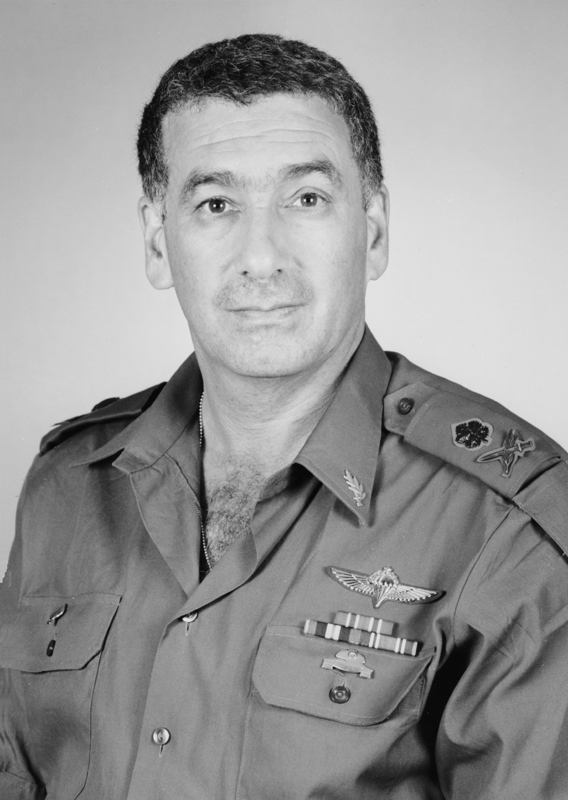
- Born: November 17, 1946; Ein Harod, Mandatory Palestine
- Died: January 12, 1994 (aged 47); Neve Yaakov, East Jerusalem
- Military career
- Allegiance: Israel Defense Forces
- Service years: 1965–1994
- Rank: Aluf
- Unit: Paratroopers Brigade
- Commands: 890 "Efe" (Echis) paratroop battalion, Sayeret Matkal, 55th Paratroopers Brigade, Nahal Brigade, the 35th Paratroopers Brigade, 91st Division, commander of Central Command
- Conflicts: Six Day War; War of Attrition; Yom Kippur War; Operation Entebbe; 1982 Lebanon War; South Lebanon conflict First Intifada
- Other work: Chairman of Mekorot

Nehemiah Tamari (Hebrew: נחמיה תמרי; November 17, 1946 – January 12, 1994) was an Israeli major general (Aluf) and the commander of Central Command in 1993–1994.

== Military service ==
Tamari was born on kibbutz Ein Harod. After finishing school, he was drafted into the IDF in 1965. He volunteered as a paratrooper in the Paratroopers Brigade. He served as a soldier and a squad leader. In 1967 he became an infantry officer after completing Officer Candidate School, during which he fought in The Six Day War, and return to the Paratroopers Brigade as a platoon leader. He then served as a company commander in the Brigade's 50 battalion and fought in the War of Attrition. Afterwards he led the Brigade's Reconnaissance company in several special operations. During the Yom Kippur War Tamari was attached to the 890 "Efe" (Echis) paratroop battalion and was wounded during the Battle of the Chinese Farm. He was later assigned to Sayeret Matkal, the IDF's special forces unit, where he served as a company commander and as executive officer. His next assignment was the commander of the 890 "Efe" (Echis) paratroop battalion. Tamari led a force of paratroopers from the battalion during Operation Entebbe. in 1978 he took command of Sayeret Matkal and in the 1982 Lebanon War he led the 55th Paratroopers Brigade during heavy fighting against PLO operatives and the Syrian army. He later commanded the Nahal and the 35th Paratroopers brigades. Afterwards he commanded the 91st Division in counter-guerrilla operations in South Lebanon and as the commander of Central Command in 1993–1994. Tamari was killed in a helicopter crash on 12 January 1994. The Agusta-Bell 206A-1 helicopter crashed while attempting to land at the helipad of the Central Command headquarters, which are located in Neve Yaakov, East Jerusalem.
