= 96th Division (Israel) =

Division in the IDF Central Command

96th Division "Gilead"
- אוגדה 91
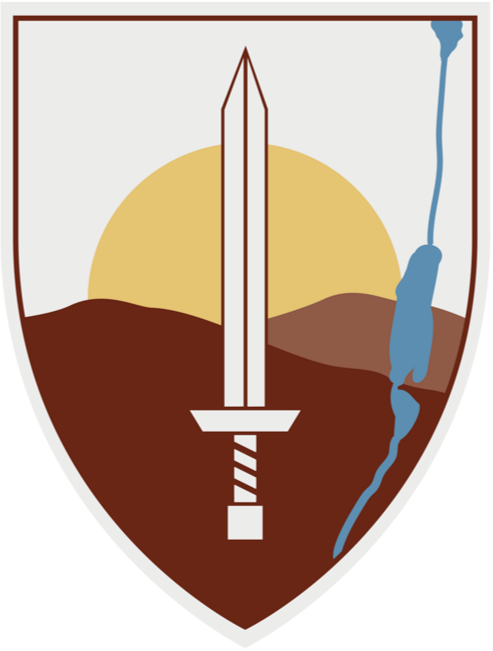
- 96th Division "Gilead" insignia
- Active: 30 October 2024 – present
- Country: Israel
- Branch: Israeli Ground Forces
- Type: Combine Arms
- Size: Division
- Part of: Central Command
- Nickname: Gilead Division

Commanders
- Notable commanders: Herzi Halevi; Yair Golan

The Israel Defense Forces 96th Division "Gilead" (Hebrew: אוגדה 96), known also as the Gilead Formation (Hebrew: עוצבת גלעד), is a reserve division in the IDF Central Command, responsible for defence of Israeli communities against attacks similar to the October 7 attacks. The division was activated on 30 October 2024.

== Division organization ==
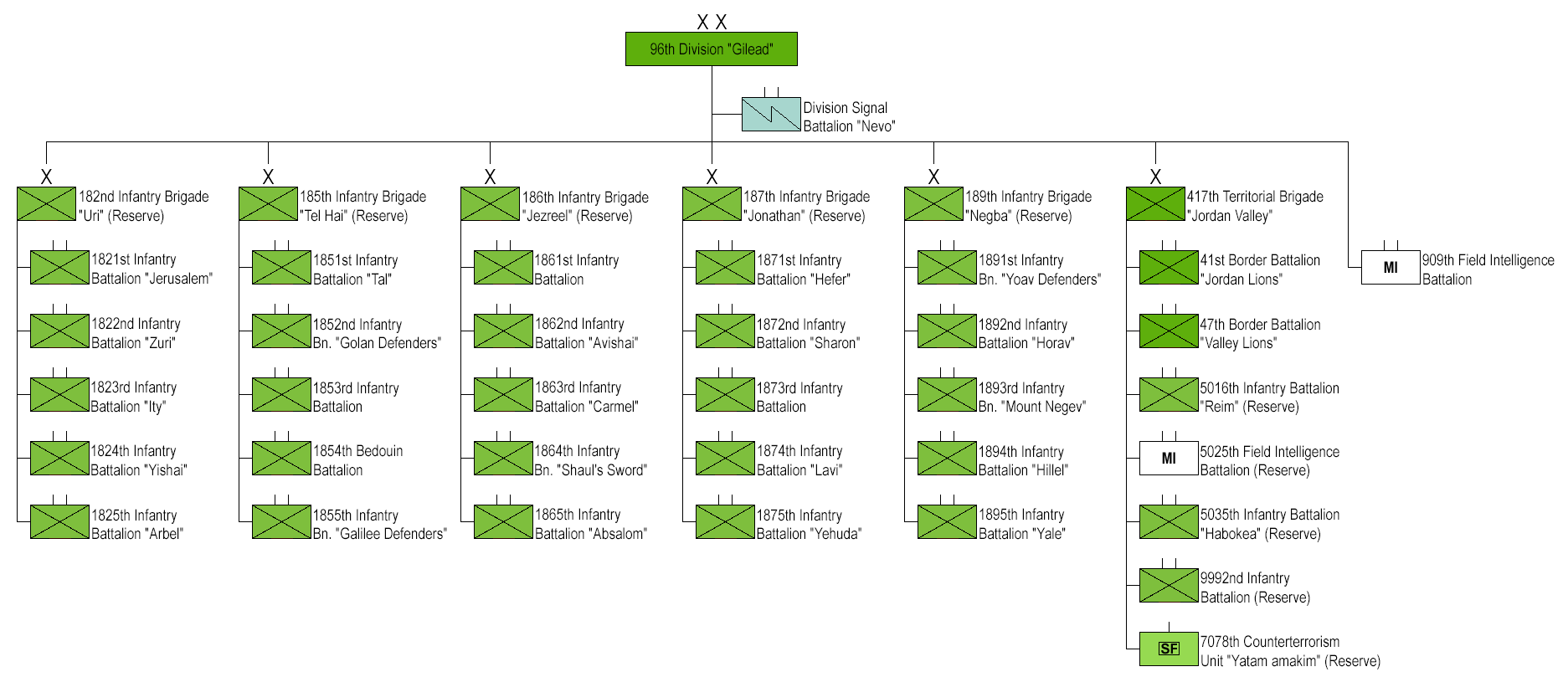
96th Division "Gilead" organization as of November 2026

- 96th Division "Gilead"
  - 182nd Infantry Brigade "Uri" (Reserve) — defence of the area between Jerusalem and Ashkelon
    - 1821st Infantry Battalion "Jerusalem" — Jerusalem and surrounding communities
    - 1822nd Infantry Battalion "Zuri" — Beit Shemesh and surrounding communities
    - 1823rd Infantry Battalion "Ity" — Rehovot, Yavne, and surrounding communities
    - 1824th Infantry Battalion "Yishai" — Ashdod, Kiryat Malakhi, and surrounding communities
    - 1825th Infantry Battalion "Arbel" — Ashkelon, Kiryat Gat, and surrounding communities
  - 186th Infantry Brigade "Jezreel" (Reserve) — defence of Galilee and the upper Jordan Valley
    - 1861st Infantry Battalion – Yokneam Illit, Kiryat Tivon, Harish, and surrounding communities
    - 1862nd Infantry Battalion "Avishai" — Nof HaGalil, Migdal HaEmek, Ramat Yishai, and surrounding communities
    - 1863rd Infantry Battalion "Carmel" — Haifa, Krayot, and surrounding communities
    - 1864th Infantry Battalion "Shaul's Sword" — Afula, Beit She'an, and surrounding communities
    - 1865th Infantry Battalion "Absalom" — Atlit, Zikhron Ya'akov, Caesarea, Hadera, Binyamina-Giv'at Ada, and surrounding communities
  - 417th Territorial Brigade "Jordan Valley"
    - 41st Border Guard Battalion "Jordan Lions"
    - 47th Border Guard Battalion "Lions of the Valley"
    - 5016th Infantry Battalion "Reim" (Reserve)
    - 5025th Field Intelligence Battalion (Reserve)
    - 5035th Infantry Battalion "Habokea" (Reserve)
    - 9992nd Infantry Battalion (Reserve)
    - 7078th Counterterrorism Unit "Yatam amakim" (Reserve)
  - 843rd Dead Sea Control & Command Center
  - 896th Division Signal Battalion "Nevo"
  - 909th Field Intelligence Battalion "Baz"
