= Khirbet Humsa al-Fawqa =

- Village

Arabic transcription(s)
  - Arabic: خربة حمصة الفوقا
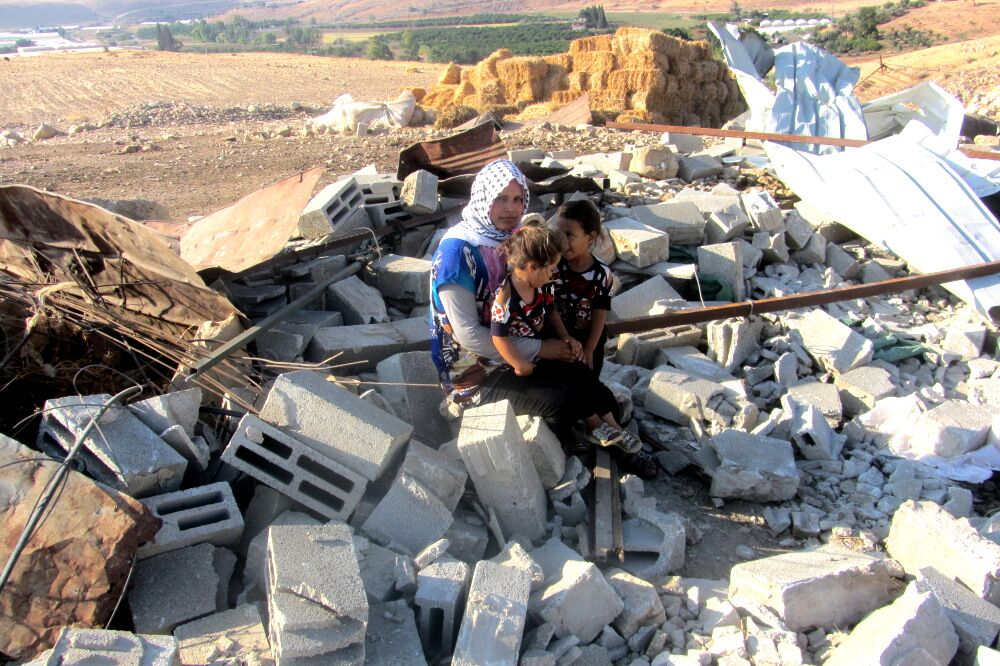
- Photo taken by B'Tselem of Khadijeh Bsharat and her daughters on the ruins of their home in Khirbet Humsah, 27 August 2015.

- Location of Khirbet Humsa al-Fawqa within Palestine
- Coordinates: 32°15′53.38″N 35°26′12.98″E
- State: State of Palestine
- Governorate: Tubas

Population (2021)
  - Total: 130

Khirbet Humsa al-Fawqa (Arabic: خربة حمصة الفوقا), also known simply as Khirbet Humsa or just al-Humsa, is a Palestinian Bedouin village that is located in Tubas Governorate of Palestine, in the northern Jordan Valley, in the northeast of the West Bank. It forms one of the three villages of the al-Bikai'a cluster that includes the three hamlets of Khirbet al-'Atuf, al-Hadidiyah, and Khirbet Humsa al-Fawqa.

== History ==
In 1972, Israel declared the area to be a live-fire zone, according to court filings. In 2005, Khirbet Humsa al-Fawqa was reported as having been completely evacuated since 2002 as it was considered a heavy training ground for militants. On 5 November 2020, Israeli bulldozers demolished most of the village and forced 73 of its Palestinian residents, including 41 children to leave in what was the largest demolition in years. Palestinian Prime Minister Mohammad Shtayyeh accused Israel of timing the demolition for election day in the United States, when the world was distracted. The residents returned soon after. The demolition was condemned by the European Union and the United Nations. On 4 February 2021, Israel razed for the second time because of what it claimed was an illegal settlement next to a military firing range. The Israeli rights group B'Tselem called the demolition "unusually broad", accusing Israel of seeking "to forcibly transfer Palestinian communities in order to take over their land." On 7 July 2021, it was demolished by Israel again for at least the third time. In March 2026, a group of more than 20 settlers allegedly attacked the village, zip-tying and beating the residents and stealing their sheep and other goods. One settler was accused of committing sexual assault by cutting off a man's clothes and zip-tying his penis.

== Water and electricity ==
The local authorities in Tubas Governorate provided electricity through solar energy, which was later destroyed by Israel, and it controls the sources of water and deprives the Palestinian population of its use. This forces them to buy water tanks from far away.
