= Shmuel Eyal =

Israeli Haganah fighter and major general

OBE Shmuel (Rubashkin) Eyal
- שמואל איל
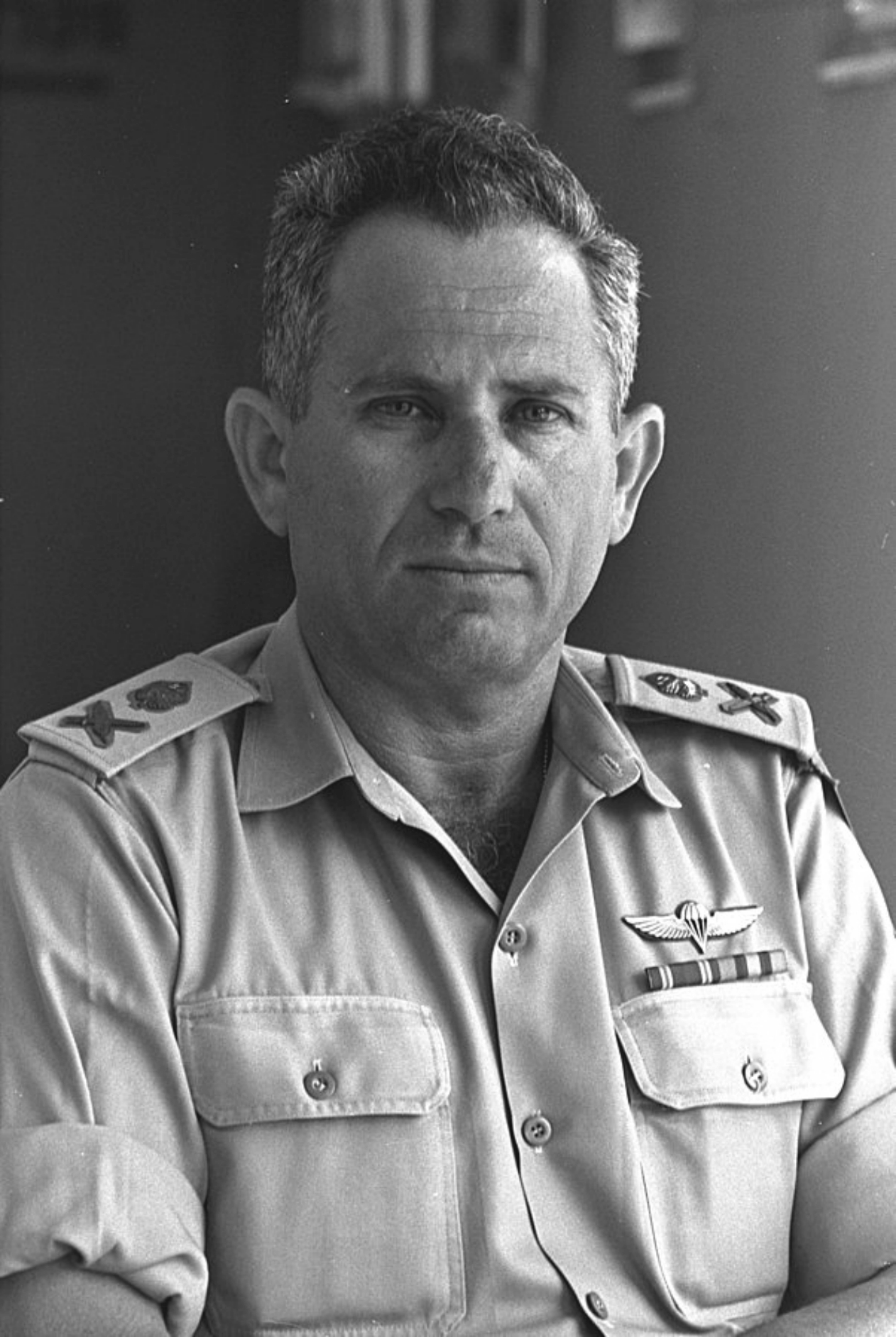
- Eyal in 1967
- Born: November 17, 1922; Vitebsk, Byelorussian Soviet Socialist Republic
- Died: March 5, 2008 (aged 85); Israel
- Burial place: Rishon LeZion Military Cemetery
- Spouse: Eyal (Shelingboim) Haya
- Military career
- Allegiance: Israel
- Branch: Haganah; Israel Defense Forces; Jewish Settlement Police
- Service years: 1937–1973
- Rank: Aluf
- Commands: Battalion commander of Nahal Brigade; Civilian Defense's Chief Officer; Head of the Manpower Directorate, 1966–1970; Military attaché in the United Kingdom
- Conflicts: 1947–1949 Palestine war; Sinai War; Six-Day War; War of Attrition; Yom Kippur War
- Awards: Order of the British Empire; Worthy Citizen of Rishon Le-Zion
- Other work: CEO of Hamashbir Lazarchan

Shmuel (Rubashkin) Eyal (Hebrew: שמואל איל; November 7, 1922 – March 5, 2008), OBE, was Haganah fighter and later a major general in the Israel Defense Forces. He served as the 8th head of the Manpower Directorate from 1966 to 1970.

== Biography ==
Eyal was born on November 7, 1922, in Vitebsk in Byelorussian Soviet Socialist Republic. In 1924 he immigrated to Mandatory Palestine with his family. He attended the Haviv Elementary School in Rishon LeZion. He graduated from the Hebrew University of Jerusalem with a degree in economics and history.

In 1937 he joined the Haganah and underwent a course in Kiryat Anavim. In 1940 he joined the Jewish Settlement Police where he served as a constable ("ghaffir"). During his service he graduated from the Juara training base in Ramat Menashe, in northern Israel. By 1946 was promoted to general commander in Rishon Lezion. In 1947 he was promoted to Ephraim district commander.

During the 1947–1949 Palestine war, he commanded the 52nd battalion of the Givati Brigade. As a commander he participated in the capture of Ashkelon, Nitzanim, and Isdud. He participated in besieging the Fallujah Pocket in the fight for Beersheba.

After the war, Eyal served as the a head manager in the Israeli Air Force. He continued his studies at the Hebrew University. In 1958 he was appointed Civilian Defense's Chief Officer, and by 1960 he had become the commander of the Nahal Brigade. In 1966 he was appointed to head of the Manpower Directorate.

=== Israel's military attaché in the UK ===
After completing his term in 1970 he served as Military attaché in the United Kingdom. At the end of his service, Shmuel Eyal was awarded Officer of the Most Excellent Order of the British Empire by the Queen of the United Kingdom, Elizabeth II for his work in advancing the commerce between Israel and Britain. He was discharged from the army with the rank of major general in 1973.

=== After his release from the IDF ===
With the outbreak of the Yom Kippur War, he was re-enlisted and took part in the Israeli delegation to the "101 Kilometer Talks" which led to the Agreement on Disengagement between Israel and Egypt.

After his release from the army, Eyal ran for mayor of Rishon Lezion from the Alignment party. In 1974 he was appointed to CEO of Hamashbir Lazarchan. Between 1975 and 1989 he acted as the general manager. At the same time he also as assistant chief of the Personnel Directorate assisting with Israeli MIAs. He held that role until 1983.

After retiring, Eyal was involved in many volunteering roles, including:

- Member of the Veterans of the Haganah
- National Board Member of the Israel Management Center
- Member of the Public Council for Commemorating Soldiers
- Member of The Society for Preservation of Israel Heritage Sites (SPIHS)
- Friends of the Rishon Lezion Museum
