= Central Command (Israel) =

Regional command of the Israel Defense Forces

- פיקוד מרכז
- Pakmaz logo, depicting the Lion of Judah
- Active: 1948–present
- Country: Israel
- Part of: Israel Defense Forces
- Engagements: 1948 Palestine war; Six Day War; Yom Kippur War; First Intifada; Second Intifada; July 2023 Jenin incursion; Gaza war

Commanders
- Current commander: Aluf Avi Bluth

Insignia
- Flag

The Central Command (Hebrew: פיקוד מרכז, Pikud Merkaz), often abbreviated to Pakmaz (פקמ"ז), is a regional command of the Israel Defense Forces. It is responsible for the units and brigades located in the West Bank (under the West Bank Division), Jerusalem, the Sharon, Gush Dan, and the Shephelah.

The commander of the central command is the one who is authorized to declare new cities in the Judea and Samaria Area.

== History ==
During the 1948 Arab–Israeli War, the Central Command was in-charge of the war efforts against Jordan, particularly on the road to Jerusalem, occupying the "Small Triangle" (east Sharon), Lod, and Ramla. During the Six-Day War, the Command led the occupation of the West Bank from Jordan. As of the First Intifada, the Command primarily engages in security and counter-terrorism activities, as well as more conventional military measures, in the West Bank.

Towards the end of 2010 the deployment of IDF troops in and around the West Bank reached a new quantitative low with only half the number of infantry battalions serving where "dozens" were required during the first Intifada.

== Command organization ==
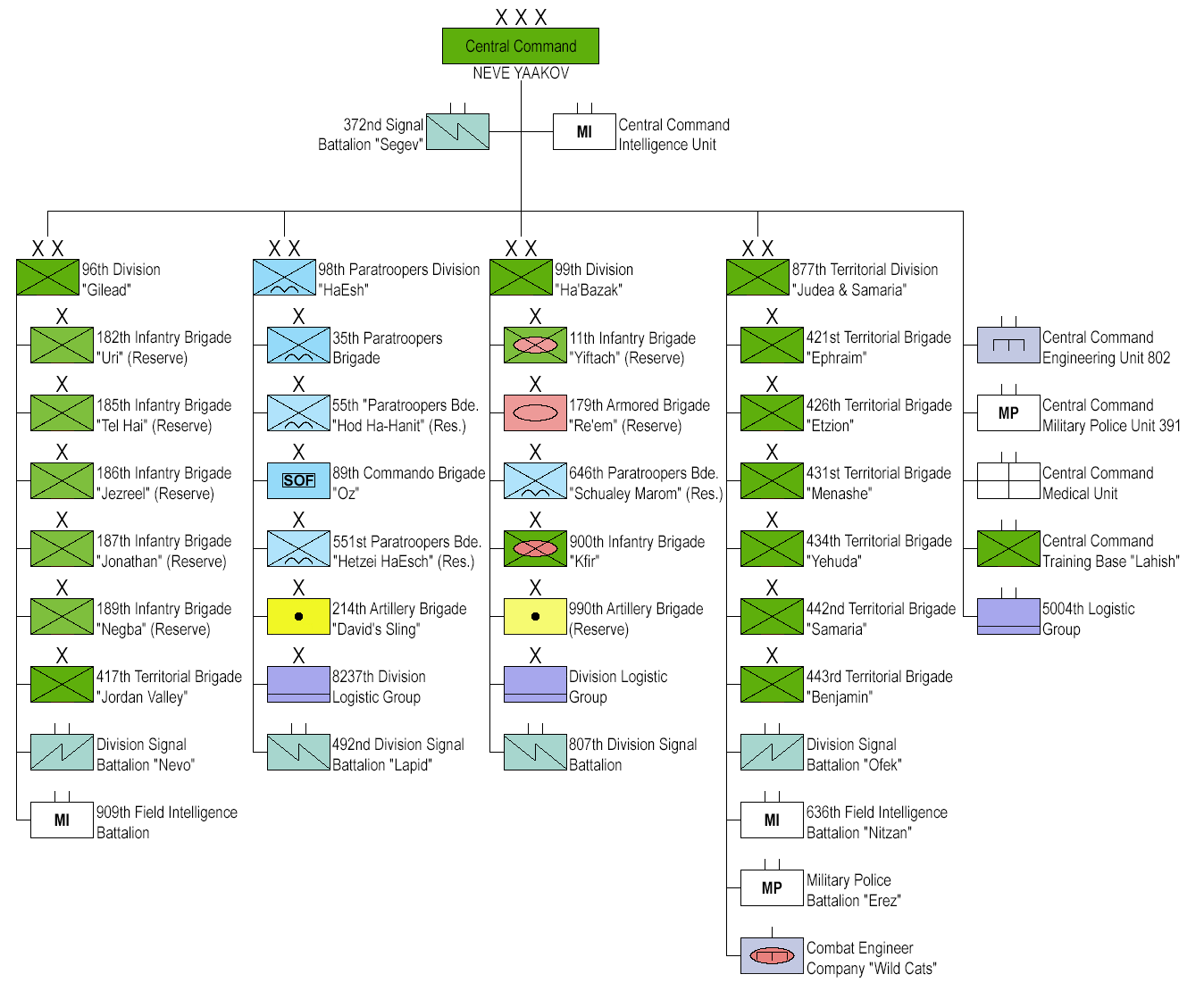
Central Command organization as of November 2026

- Central Command, in Neve Yaakov
  - 96th Division "Gilead"
    - 182nd Infantry Brigade "Uri" (Reserve)
    - 186th Infantry Brigade "Jezreel" (Reserve)
    - 417th Territorial Brigade "Jordan Valley"
  - 98th Division "Ha-Esh" ("Fire")
    - 35th Paratroopers Brigade
    - 55th Paratroopers Brigade "Hod Ha-Hanit" ("Spearhead") (Reserve)
    - 89th Commando Brigade "Oz" ("Courage")
    - 551st Paratroopers Brigade "Hetzei Ha-Esch" ("Fire Arrows") (Reserve)
    - 214th Artillery Brigade "David's Sling"
    - 8237th Division Logistic Group
  - 99th Division "Ha'Bazak" ("Flash") (Reserve)
    - 11th Infantry Brigade "Yiftach" (Reserve)
    - 179th Armored Brigade "Re'em" (Reserve)
    - 646th Paratroopers Brigade "Schualey Marom" (Reserve)
    - 900th Infantry Brigade "Kfir"
    - 990th Artillery Brigade (Reserve artillery command without permanently assigned battalions)
    - Division Logistic Group
  - 877th Division "Judea and Samaria"
    - 187th Infantry Brigade "Jonathan" (Reserve)
    - 421st Territorial Brigade "Ephraim" – Qalqilya sector
    - 426th Territorial Brigade "Etzion" – Bethlehem sector
    - 431st Territorial Brigade "Menashe" – Jenin and Tulkarm sectors
    - 434th Territorial Brigade "Yehuda" – Hebron sector
    - 442nd Territorial Brigade "Samaria" – Nablus sector
    - 443rd Territorial Brigade "Benjamin" – Ramallah sector and Road 443
    - Judea and Samaria Border Guard
  - Central Command Intelligence Unit
  - Central Command Training Base "Lahish"
  - Central Command Medical Unit
  - 372nd Signal Battalion "Segev"
  - 391st Military Police Unit
  - 638th Maintenance Battalion "HaMerkaz"
  - 802nd Combat Engineering Equipment Unit
    - 7058th Combat Engineering Equipment Battalion (Reserve)
  - 5004th Logistic Group

== Commanders ==
All commanders of the Central Command were ranked Aluf (Major General).

- Zvi Ayalon (1948–1952)
- Yosef Avidar (1952–1953)
- Zvi Ayalon (1954–1956)
- Zvi Zur (1956–1958)
- Meir Amit (1958–1959)
- Yosef Geva (1960–1966)
- Uzi Narkis (1966–1968)
- Rehav'am Ze'evi (1968–1972)
- Yona Efrat (1973–1977)
- Moshe Levi (1977–1981)
- Ori Orr (1981–1983)
- Amnon Lipkin-Shahak (1983–1986)
- Ehud Barak (1986–1987)
- Amram Mitzna (1987–1989)
- Yitzhak Mordechai (1989–1991)
- Danny Yatom (1991–1993)
- Nehemiah Tamari (1993–1994) - KIA
- Danny Yatom (1994)
- Ilan Birn (1994–1995)
- Uzi Dayan (1996–1998)
- Moshe Ya'alon (1998–2000)
- Yitzhak Eitan (2000–2002)
- Moshe Kaplinsky (2002–2004)
- Yair Nave (2004–2007)
- Gadi Shamni (2007–2009)
- Avi Mizrahi (2009–2012)
- Nitzan Alon (2012–2015)
- Roni Numa (2015–2018)
- Nadav Padan (2018–2020)
- Tamir Yadai (2020–2021)
- Yehuda Fox (2021–2024)
- Avi Bluth (2024-)

== See also ==
- Israel Defense Forces
- IDF Code of Ethics
