= Oz Brigade =

Israeli military special operations brigade

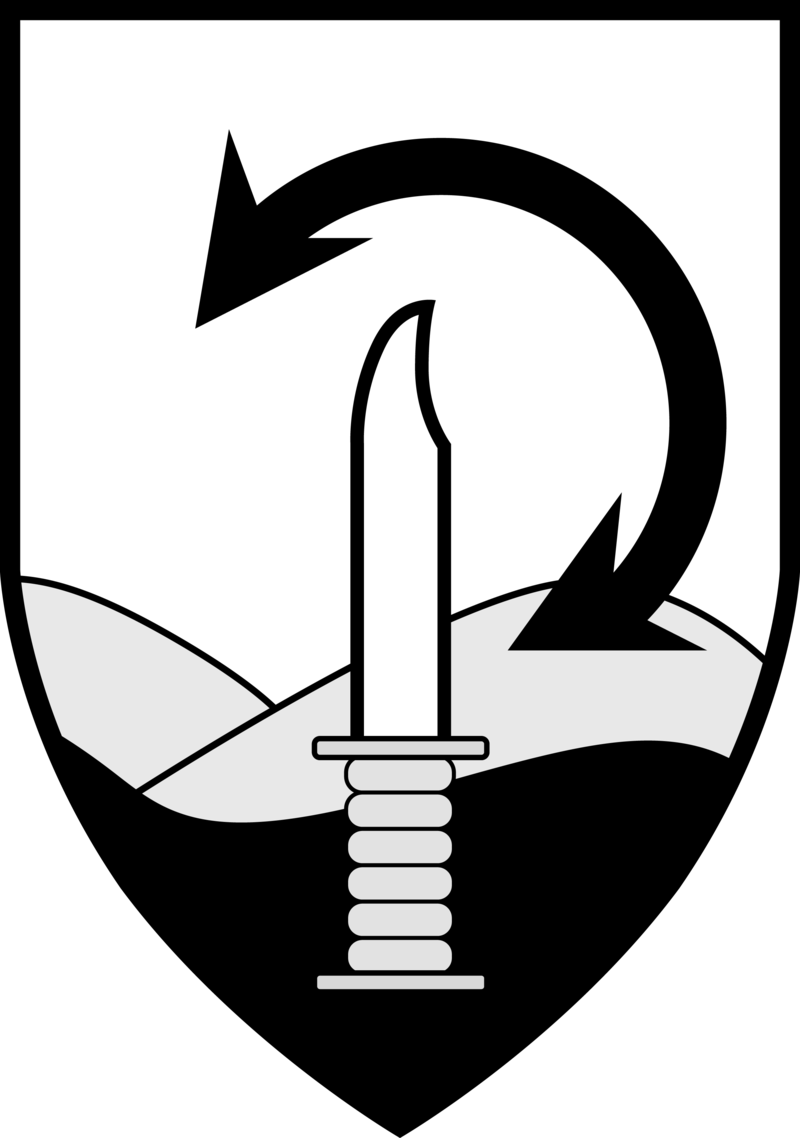
- 89th brigade patch
- Active: 2015–present
- Country: Israel
- Branch: Israeli Ground Forces
- Role: Commando
- Part of: Central Command; 98th Division
- Nickname: Commando brigade
- Motto: "Thy hand shall be on the neck of thine enemies" (Genesis 49:8)

Commanders
- Current commander: Brigadier General Omer Cohen

The Oz Brigade (89th Brigade), also known as Commando Brigade, is an infantry formation for special operations of the Israeli Ground Forces. The brigade brings together four commando units – the Egoz Unit, the Maglan Unit, the Duvdevan Unit and the Operational Support Unit. It was established in December 2015. Commanded by Colonel Omer Cohen, the brigade operates as part of the 98th Division.

== Ideation and development ==
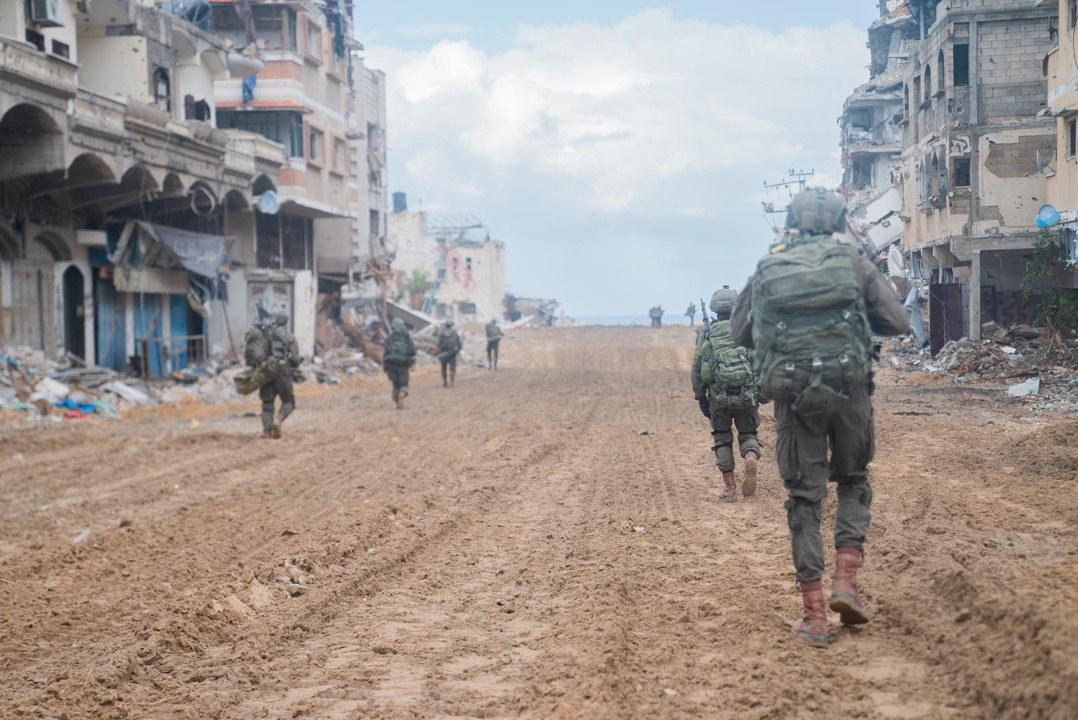
Oz Brigade in Gaza in February 2024

According to the IDF, the Commando Brigade is the brainchild of Lieutenant General Gadi Eisenkot and is the implementation of operational lessons learned during Operation Protective Edge in the summer of 2014 and the Second Lebanon War in 2006. According to the 98th Division Commander, the brigade is an integration of the elite teams of the Infantry Corps under one command, and a body expected to lead operational and tactical thinking in order to establish a new warfare doctrine. The new Brigade is intended to provide special operations units a previously lacking centre of gravity.

The concept of a commando brigade was developed by IDF Chief of Staff Gadi Eisenkot during the formulation of the 5-years military plan. The new brigade is said to draw further parallels between Israel's special forces and the American 75th Ranger Regiment.

Other special-operations units, Sayeret Matkal, Shayetet 13, Shaldag, Oketz and Yahalom continue to operate independently.

=== Brigade organization ===
The 89th Brigade consists of three (formerly four) commando units of the IDF. The brigade had a fourth battalion, the now defunct Unit 845, or "Rimon", desert warfare unit, which was absorbed into Maglan in June 2018. It also has an elite transport unit tasked with transporting special operations soldiers to and from battlefields in a variety of conditions, assorted support units, and a commando training school. As of 2025, the brigade consists of:

- 89th Commando Brigade Oz/Courage
  - Unit 212 "Maglan" – special reconnaissance unit
  - Unit 217 "Duvdevan" – undercover counter terrorism unit
  - Unit 621 "Egoz" – guerilla warfare unit
  - Commando School "Oz"
  - 6212th Battalion (Unit 212 "Maglan" Reserve)
  - 6217th Battalion (Unit 217 "Duvdevan" Reserve)
  - 5589th Logistic Battalion
  - Signal Company

== Commanders ==
- Brigadier General David Zini (2015–2017)
- Brigadier General Avi Blot (2017–2018)
- Colonel Kobi Heller (2018 –2021)
- Brigadier General Meni Liberty (2021–2023)
- Colonel Omer Cohen (2023-present)

== Insignia ==
The insignia chosen for the new brigade depicts the Hebrew letter Quf (ק), the first letter in the Hebrew word for Commando (קומנדו), composed of a commando knife rising from the sea and a double headed arrow above it. It symbolizes the special designation of the brigade and its mobility, by air, land or sea.

== See also ==
- Special forces of Israel
- Mista'arvim
- 11th 'Yiftach' Brigade - functions as the reserve commando brigade in the IDF
