= Menashe Territorial Brigade =

IDF Military Brigade

- חטיבת מנשה
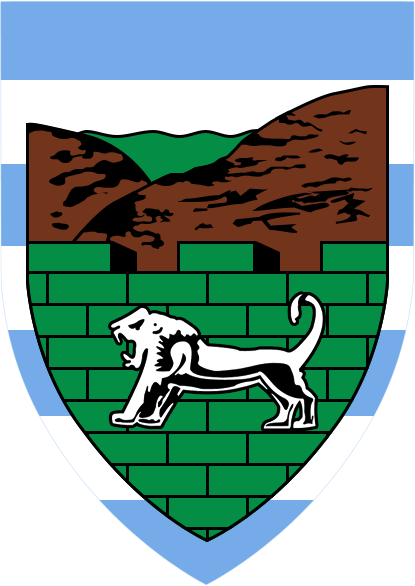
- Active: 1987-present
- Country: Israel
- Allegiance: Israel Defense Forces
- Role: Territorial Brigade
- Part of: Judea and Samaria Division
- Garrison/HQ: Jenin Area
- Engagements: First Intifada; Second Intifada; Operation Defensive Shield

Commanders
- Current commander: Ayub Kayuf
- Notable commanders: Herzi Halevi - 23rd IDF Chief of Staff; Yoav Gallant - 22nd Minister of Defense

The 431st "Menasha" Territorial Brigade (also known as the Jenin Brigade) is a Territorial Brigade in the Israel Defense Forces whose role is to control law and order in the Jenin and Tulkarm sectors and to prevent terrorist attacks. The brigade is under the command of the Judea and Samaria Division.

== The name and emblem ==
The brigade is named after the tribe of Menashe which according to the bible was settled in the same area as the brigade.

The Brigade's emblem is built out of 4 pieces: Blue and white lines, symbolizing the flag of Israel, the Gilboa mountain, A wall that symbolizes the West Bank separation barrier and the lion that represents the Central Command.

== Headquarters ==
The Headquarters of the unit is located in a military camp near Ein Shemer.

== Organization and purpose ==
Unlike the other territorial divisions in the West Bank, the Menasha Division is not responsible for just one central Palestinian district, but for two: Jenin and Tulkarm.

=== Notable commanders ===
Name	Period of service	Notes
Yoav Gallant	1993–1994	Later served as commander of Southern Command and Minister of Defense
Herzi Halevi	2005–2007	Later served as Chief of the General Staff
Ghassan Alian	2011–2013	Later served as commander of COGAT
Hezi Nehama	2015–2017	Later served as commander of Alexandroni Brigade
Yair Pali	2019–2021	
Arik Moyal	2021–2023	
Ayub Kayuf	August 2023 -	The current commander of the brigade
