= Duvdevan Unit =

Israeli undercover counter-terrorism unit

Unit 217
- יחידה 217
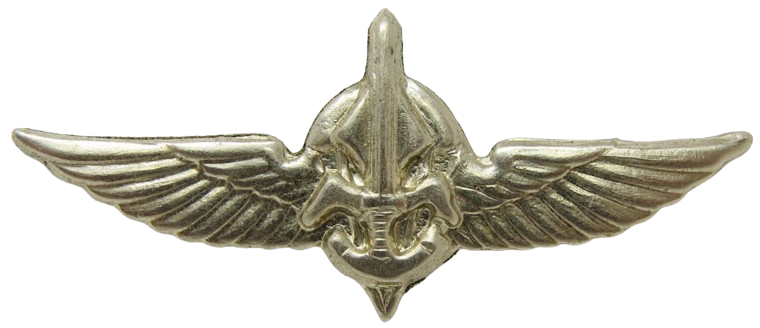
- Combat pin of Unit 217
- Active: 1986–present
- Country: Israel
- Type: Mistaʽaravim
- Role: counter-terrorism
- Part of: 89th "Oz" Brigade
- Nickname: Duvdevan (דובדבן)
- Mottos: כִּ֣י בְ֖תַחְבֻּלוֹת תַּעֲשֶׂה־לְּךָ֣ מִלְחָמָ֑ה "For by wise counsel thou shalt make thy war" (Proverbs 24:6)
- Colours

Unit 217, frequently called Duvdevan (Hebrew: דובדבן, lit. 'cherry'), is a mistaʽaravim unit in the Commando Brigade of the Israel Defense Forces.

It conducts undercover operations in urban areas, during which its members often wear civilian clothing to disguise themselves among the local Arab populace.

== History ==
According to the Israel Defense Forces (IDF), Unit 217 was established in June 1986 to deal with "security events" in the West Bank, especially in its densely populated civilian areas. During the 2015–2016 violence wave, the unit was involved in the arrests of the killers of Eitam and Naʽama Henkin, Hafna Meir, and rabbi Yaʽakov Littman (sometimes spelled Litman) and his son. For its work during this period, Unit 217 received the Israeli Chief of Staff citation.

Roni Numa was a commander of the Duvdevan Unit before being promoted to aluf (major general).

Upon joining the Commando Brigade, Unit 217 expanded its operational activities.

According to the documentary, Who Killed Shireen?, in 2022 a member of the Duvdevan unit killed Palestinian-American journalist Shireen Abu Akleh, who was reporting for Al Jazeera in Jenin.

== Organization and mission ==
The unit is part of the "Oz" 89th Commando Brigade (a brigade dedicated solely to special operations), but Duvdevan operators undergo basic training in the Paratroopers Brigade. Unit 217 is most similar to the Yamas unit of the Israel Border Police.

== In fiction ==
The Netflix television series Fauda focuses on a fictional Israeli elite unit modeled after Duvdevan. The series was co-created by Lior Raz and Avi Issacharoff; Raz formerly served in the unit.

== Equipment ==
- Jericho 941 semi-automatic pistol
- M89SR sniper rifle
- M24 Sniper Weapon System – sniper system
- M4 carbine with 10" barrel
- Remington 870 combat shotgun
- Para Micro-Uzi submachine gun
- IMI Negev machine gun
- Shipon multi-purpose rocket-launcher
- Mk 47 Striker automatic grenade launcher
- Glock 17/19C
- combat knife

== Gallery ==
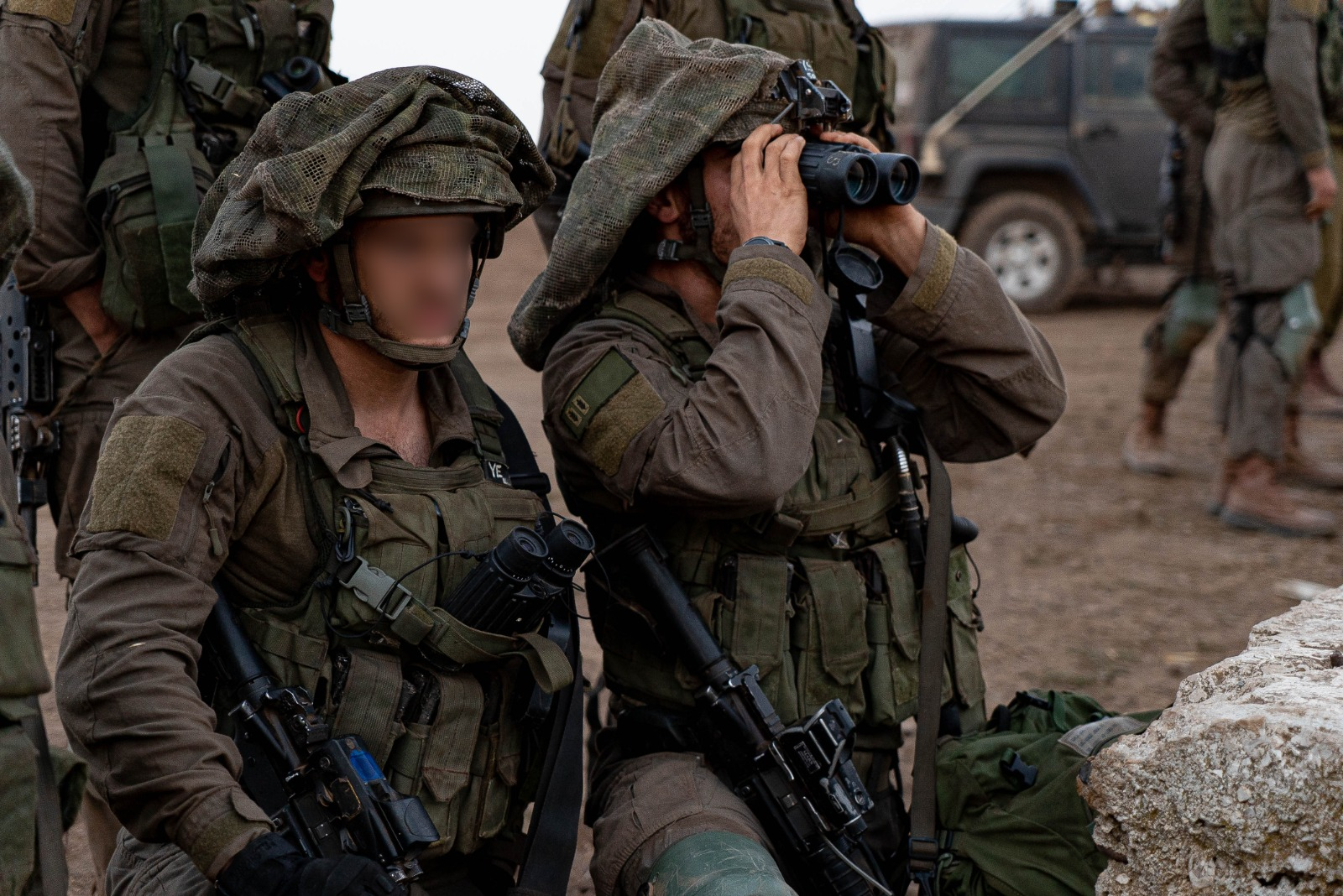
Duvdevan Unit, September 2020

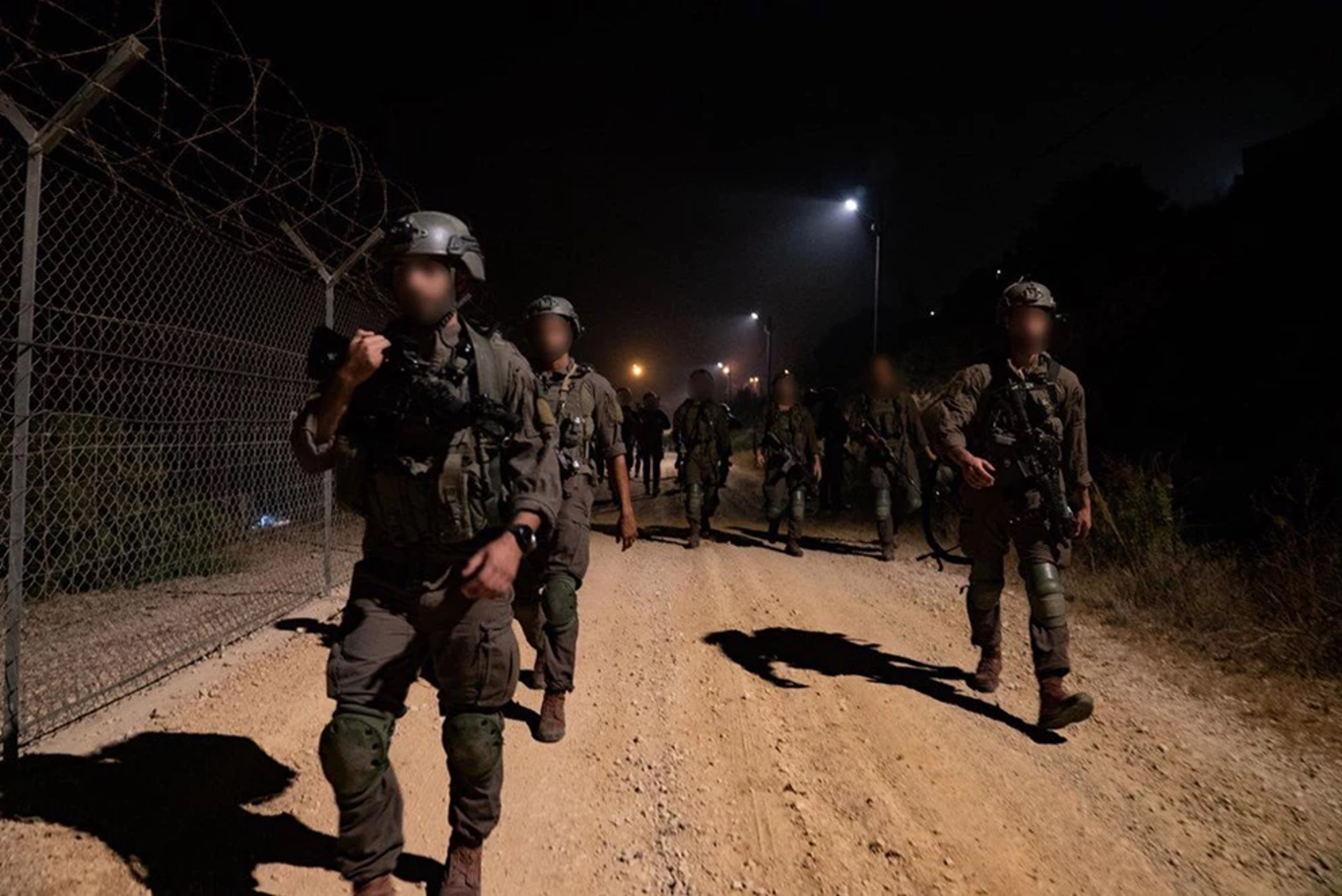
Duvdevan soldiers in the West Bank, 2024

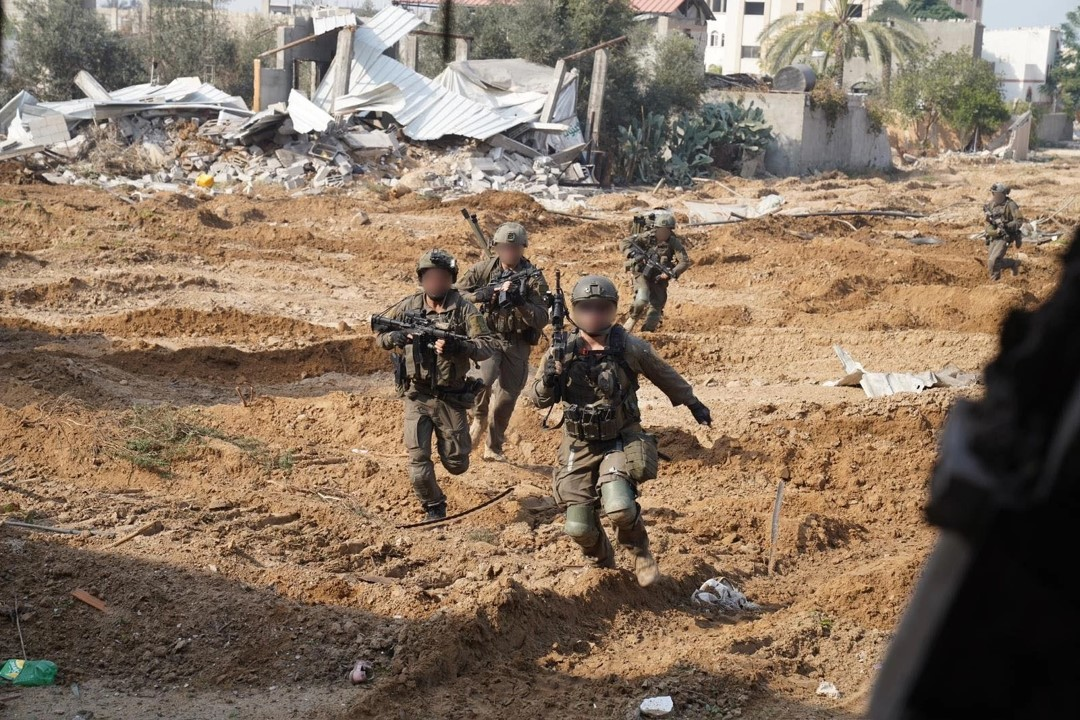
Duvdevan soldiers in Khan Yunis during the Gaza war

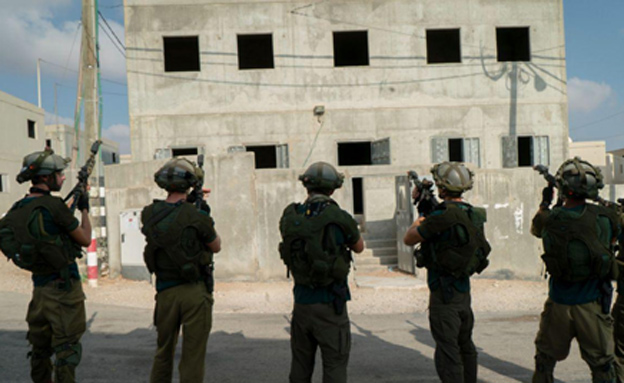
Joint exercise of the Duvdevan Unit and the 601st Special Forces Group of the Czech Army

== See also ==
- Heroes for life
- Israeli Special Forces Units
- Kidon
- Samson Unit
- Killing of Shireen Abu Akleh, alleged to be involved in the 2022 killing of a journalist
