= Judea and Samaria Division =

877th Judea and Samaria Division
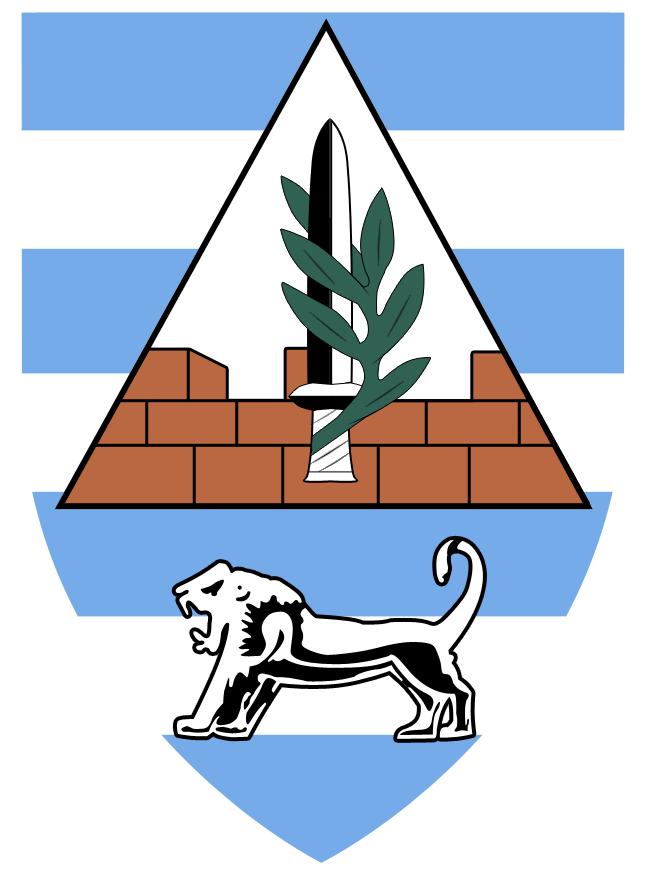
- The 877th Judea and Samaria Division patch
- Founded: 1988–present
- Country: Israel
- Branch: Israeli Ground Forces
- Type: Combined arms
- Size: Division
- Part of: Central Command
- Garrison/HQ: Beit El

Commanders
- Current commander: Tat aluf Avi Bluth

The Israeli 877th "Judea and Samaria" Division (Hebrew: אוּגְדָּת אֵזוֹר יְהוּדָה וְשׁוֹמְרוֹן, Ugdat Ezor Yehuda VeShomron; also known as the West Bank Division) is a regional division of the Central Command. It is responsible for Israeli military activity in the Judea and Samaria Area.

== Division organization ==
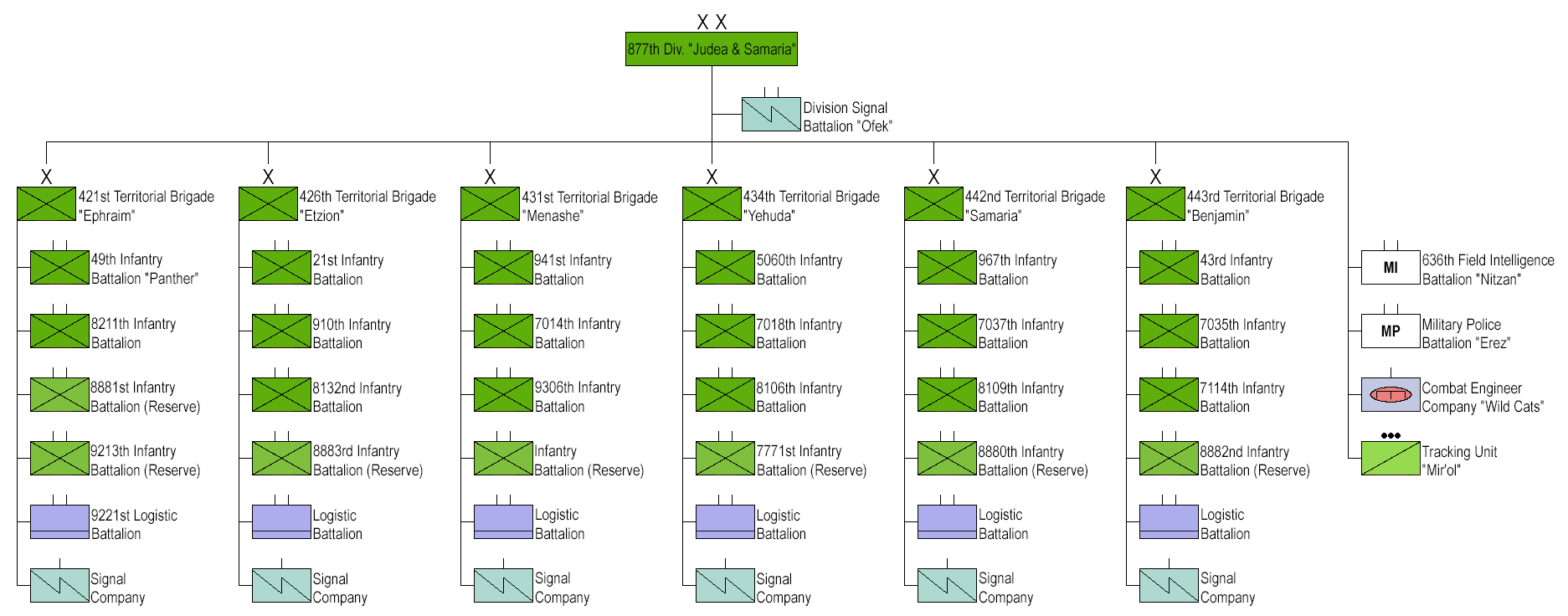
877th Division "Judea and Samaria" organization as of November 2026

- 877th Territorial Division "Judea and Samaria"
  - 187th Infantry Brigade "Jonathan" (Reserve) — defence of central Israel and Tel Aviv
    - 1871st Infantry Battalion "Hefer" — Hefer Valley and northern Sharon plain communities
    - 1872nd Infantry Battalion "Sharon" — Sharon plain communities
    - 1873rd Infantry Battalion — Gush Dan (Tel Aviv metropolitan area)
    - 1874th Infantry Battalion "Lavi" — Ramla, Lod, Rishon LeZion, and surrounding communities
    - 1875th Infantry Battalion "Yehuda" — Modi'in-Maccabim-Re'ut area
  - 421st Territorial Brigade "Ephraim" – Qalqilya and Tulkarm sectors
    - 49th Border Guard Battalion "Panther"
    - 8211th Reconnaissance Battalion (Reserve)
    - 8881st Infantry Battalion (Reserve)
    - 9213th Infantry Battalion (Reserve)
    - 9221st Logistic Battalion
    - Signal Company
  - 426th Territorial Brigade "Etzion" – Bethlehem sector
    - 21st Infantry Battalion
    - 910th Infantry Battalion
    - 8132nd Infantry Battalion (Reserve)
    - 8883rd Infantry Battalion (Reserve)
    - Logistic Battalion
    - Signal Company
  - 431st Territorial Brigade "Menashe" – Jenin sector
    - 941st Infantry Battalion
    - 7014th Infantry Battalion
    - 9306th Infantry Battalion
    - Infantry Battalion (Reserve)
    - Logistic Battalion
    - Signal Company
  - 434th Territorial Brigade "Yehuda" – Hebron sector
    - 5060th Infantry Battalion
    - 7018th Infantry Battalion
    - 8106th Infantry Battalion
    - 7771st Infantry Battalion (Reserve)
    - Logistic Battalion
    - Signal Company
  - 442nd Territorial Brigade "Samaria" – Nablus sector
    - 967th Infantry Battalion "Hetzev"
    - 7037th Infantry Battalion "Nadav"
    - 8109th Infantry Battalion "Regev"
    - 8880th Infantry Battalion (Reserve)
    - Logistic Battalion
    - Signal Company
  - 443rd Territorial Brigade "Benjamin" – Ramallah sector and Highway 443
    - 43rd Infantry Battalion
    - 7035th Infantry Battalion
    - 7114th Infantry Battalion
    - 8882nd Infantry Battalion (Reserve)
    - Logistic Battalion
    - Signal Company
  - Judea and Samaria Border Guard
    - 15 × Security companies
    - Samaria EOD Unit
    - Judea EOD Unit
    - Judea and Samaria Detainee Escort Unit
    - Judea and Samaria Undercover Unit
    - Judea and Samaria Counterterrorism
  - Division Signal Battalion "Ofek"
  - 636th Field Intelligence Battalion "Nitzan"
  - Military Police Battalion "Erez"
  - Combat Engineer Company "Wild Cats"
  - Tracking Unit "Mir'ol"

== See also ==
- Gaza Division
- West Bank Closures
