= Moshe Nativ =

- משה נתיב
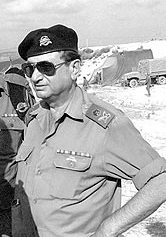
- Born: June 22, 1932; Petrova, Transylvania, Romania
- Died: September 20, 2008 (aged 76); Israel
- Military career
- Allegiance: Israel
- Branch: Israel Defense Forces
- Service years: 1949–1983
- Rank: Aluf
- Commands: 7th Brigade; Armored Corps; Manpower Directorate, 1978–1983
- Conflicts: Sinai War; Six-Day War; War of Attrition; Yom Kippur War; 1982 Lebanon War
- Other work: Director of the Jewish Agency for Israel; Chairman of Amigour; President of the Council for a Beautiful Israel; Chairman of Gymnasia Herzliya

Moshe Nativ (Hebrew: משה נתיב; born Moise Vegh; June 22, 1932 – September 20, 2008) was Israel Defense Forces Major General and former head of the Manpower Directorate.

== Biography ==
Nativ was born as Moise Vegh in 1932 in a Petrova, a small village in central Transylvania, Romania. His parents, Tzila and Yitzchak Vegh (Hebrew: יצחק וצילה וֵג), were Orthodox Jews. At the age of 3 his family moved to Botoșani. At the age of 14, inspired by the Zionist movement, Nativ ran away from home and immigrated to Israel. He fulfilled his plan through the Youth Aliyah in 1946. In 1951, he was joined by his brother and parents.

In 1949 he enlisted to the Israel Defense Forces. He served in various capacities in the Armored Corps including: Operations officer of the 7th Brigade, Tank company commander, and Operations officer for the Armored Corps. During the Six-Day War he acted as the State adjutant general under the command of Israel Tal.

During the Yom Kippur War Nativ served as the assistant chief armored corps officer. After the war, Native was transferred to the manpower division of the IDF. He served as the head of the division and later as the Deputy Chief of Staff for Personnel from 1975 to 1978. In 1978 he was appointed the head of the Manpower Directorate, a position he held until 1983. During his service, he completed his studies at the National Security College. He received his bachelor's degree from Tel Aviv University.

=== Later years ===
After his release from service, Native became the CEO of Hevrat HaOvdim. Native later served as the Director General of the Jewish Agency for Israel. In his later years Native served in many public offices including the president of the Council for a Beautiful Israel, chairman of the board of Gymnasia Herzliya, and the director of IAI.

Native died on September 20, 2008; he was survived by his wife, three children, and four grandchildren.
