= Gil (surname) =

Gil is a surname of multiple origins, including Spanish (a form of Giles), Polish ("bullfinch"), East Slavic (Гиль) and Hebrew (גיל, "joy"). Notable people with the surname include:

- Andrés Gil (born 1990), Argentine actor
- Angel Gil-Ordoñez (born 1957), Spanish conductor
- Ariadna Gil (born 1969), Spanish actress
- Avi Gil (born 1955), Israeli diplomat
- Avi Gil (IDF officer) (born 1972), Israeli military officer
- Bárbara Gil (1930–2015), Mexican actress
- Benita Gil (1913–2015), Spanish teacher and syndicalist organizer
- Bryan Gil (born 2001), Spanish footballer
- Enrique Gil (born 1992), Filipino actor
- Carles Gil (born 1992), Spanish footballer
- Cherie Gil (1963–2022), Filipino actress
- Consuelo Gil (1905–1995), Spanish publisher
- David Gil (footballer) (born 1994), Spanish footballer
- David Gil (linguist) (born 1953), British linguist
- Eddie Gil (born 1944), Filipino singer and comedian
- Federico Gil (sport shooter) (born 1988), Argentine sports shooter
- Francisco Gil Hellín (1940–2025), Spanish Roman Catholic archbishop
- Fred Gil (born 1985), Portuguese tennis player
- Gastón Gil Romero (born 1993), Argentine footballer
- Gauchito Gil (1847–1878), Argentine folk religious figure
- Gilberto Gil (born 1942), singer and songwriter, former Minister of Culture of Brazil
- Gonzalo Gil (born 1989), Argentine footballer
- Gus Gil (1939–2015), Venezuelan baseball player
- Jacob Gil, Israeli architect and town planner
- Jesús Gil (1933–2004), Spanish politician and businessman
- José Luis Gil (born 1957), Spanish actor
- Juan Gil Navarro (born 1973), Argentine actor
- Julián Gil (born 1970), Argentine model
- Leonardo Gil (born 1991), Argentine footballer
- Lucía Gil (born 1998), Spanish singer and actress
- Luis Gil (baseball) (born 1998), Dominican baseball player
- Luis Gil (soccer) (born 1993), American footballer
- María Ángeles Gil (born 1953), Spanish statistician
- Mariusz Gil (born 1983), Polish cyclist
- Margarita Gil Roësset (1908–1932), Spanish sculptor and illustrator
- Mark Gil (1961–2014), Filipino actor
- Mayra Gil (born 2003), Mexican basketball player
- Melisa Gil (born 1984), Argentine sports shooter
- Mieczysław Gil (1944–2022), Polish trade unionist and politician
- Nikki Gil (born 1987), Filipina actress
- Noelia Gil (born 1994), Spanish footballer
- Paweł Gil (born 1976), Polish football referee
- Preta Gil (1974–2025), Brazilian singer and actress
- Radosław Gil (born 1997), Polish volleyball player
- Raul Gil (born 1938), Brazilian TV host
- Ricardo Gil Lavedra (born 1949), Argentine politician
- Rosemarie Gil (born 1942), Filipino actress
- Teresa Gil de Vidaure (died in 1285), common-law wife of King James I of Aragon
- Tomás Gil (born 1977), Venezuelan track and road cyclist
- Uri Gil (born 1943), Israeli air force general
- Vladimir Gil (1906–1944), Soviet colonel
- Carolina Marcelino (born 1984), Brazilian female researcher and computer scientist

== See also ==
- Gilberto Alves, Brazilian footballer, nicknamed Gil
- Gil (Korean surname)
- Gill (name)
