= Second Tyre Operation =

Israeli raid on hezbollah base in 2006

- Part of the 2006 Lebanon War
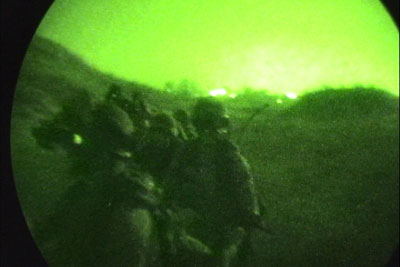
- An IDF Special forces filmed during the operation in Tyre.
| Date | 3–15 August 2006 (12 days) |
| Location | Tyre, Lebanon |
| Result | Israeli success: Destroyed about 150 targets; 40 rocket launchers destroyed |

Belligerents
| Israel | Hezbollah |

Commanders and leaders
| (Israel) Eliezer Toledano | (Hezbollah) Hassan Nasrallah |

Units involved
| (Israel) Maglan | Hezbollah troops in south - west Lebanon |

Strength
| 40 Commando troops | Hezbollah troops and Rocket launchers operators |

Casualties and losses
| None | Unknown |

The Second Tyre Operation was an Israeli military operation, carried out by the Maglan unit of the Israel Defense Forces during the 2006 Lebanon War, on August 3–15, 2006. The unit destroyed about 150 targets, including about 40 rocket launchers, in the western sector of southern Lebanon. According to Niccolò Petrelli, the commandos came from Maglan unit.

== Plan ==
The Second Lebanon War began with the kidnapping of IDF soldiers by Hezbollah and their shelling of Israeli cities in Western Galilee. The shelling intensified as the conflict intensified, with Hezbollah firing about 120 rockets per day on average, and at its peak over 250 rockets per day. A total of 3,970 rockets were fired. The operation itself was proposed to the division commander, Brigadier General Gal Hirsch, after he asked to send Maglan's men to a nature reserve in the Bint Jbeil area. The commander of the unit Lt. Col. Eliezer Toledano and his staff suggested to Hirsch the "Beach Boys" as an alternative plan. The operation was approved by the commander of the division Gal Hirsch, led by the deputy commander of the unit Major Amos HaCohen, and assigned to the unit's special operations platoon under the command of Captain Yuval Gaz.

== Operation ==
Maglan's fighters landed in the area of Ras Biadah. Maglan's regular and reserve teams were scattered all along the Lebanese sector and engaged in hunting Katyusha and Grad launchers, while well camouflaged in the depth of the terrain. Maglan's fighters "hunted" the targets through the aiming of precision weaponry. The forces avoided hitting the Hezbollah fighters point by point, in order not to reveal their location in exchange for targets of low importance. During the operation, the forces destroyed about 150 quality targets (command posts, trucks, ammunition and infrastructure), including about 40 rocket launchers. The rocket launchers were the small, simple and cheap launchers, the ones that the air force could not hit. Thus, Operation Beach Boys was a sort of complementary operation to Operation Specific Gravity, and to the Air Force's activities during the war. Some of the targets were destroyed using intelligence generated before and during the war, while some of the targets were destroyed after Maglan's forces identified them in the field. Once there was an exchange of forces, they received a supply of water, food and batteries.

== Result ==
The operation is considered by the Israelis to have been particularly successful, due to the fact that the ability of the Hezbollah organization to hit the Israeli rear was severely damaged, through the destruction of approximately 40 rocket launchers. It is estimated that the operation led to a reduction of about 40 percent in the shooting along the route to the area of Nahariya and Acre. "Maglan was able to do in a few days what the Air Force could not do in three weeks," said after the war a very senior officer, himself a graduate of an elite unit. The Maglan unit received a unit commendation from the General of the Central Command for its activity in the war.
