= Gadi Eisenkot =

Israeli general and politician (born 1960)

- גדי איזנקוט
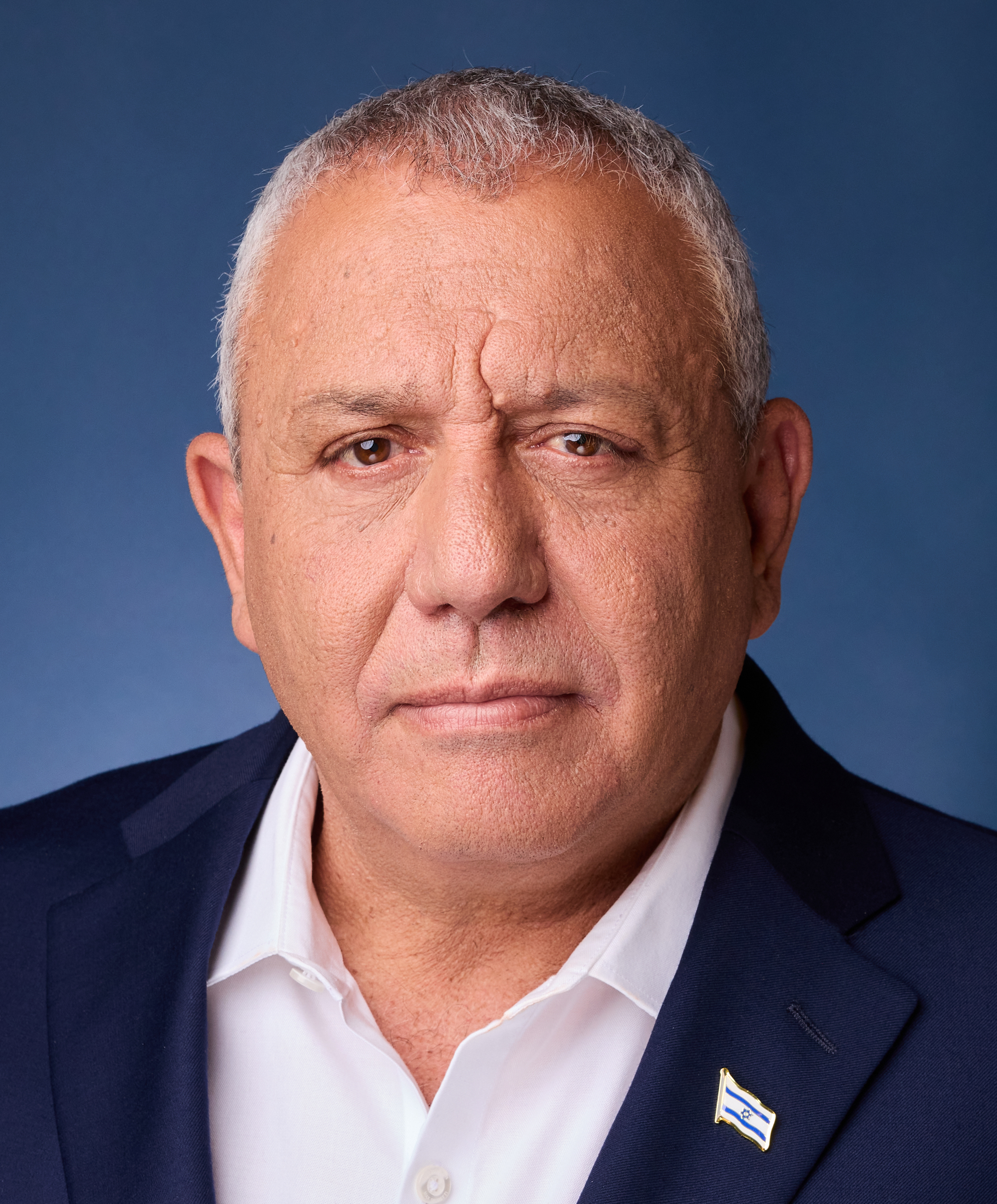
- Eisenkot in 2026

Ministerial roles
- 2023–2024: Minister without portfolio
- 2023–2024: Observer of the war cabinet

Faction represented in the Knesset
- 2022–2025: National Unity
- 2026–: Yashar

Military roles
- 2015–2019: Chief of the General Staff

Personal details
- Born: 19 May 1960 (age 66) Tiberias, Israel
- Party: Yashar (2025–present)
- Other political affiliations: National Unity (2022–2025)
- Spouse: Hannah Eisenkot (m. 1984)
- Children: 5
- Education: Tel Aviv University (BA); University of Haifa (MA); United States Army War College (MSS)
- Occupation: Military officer, politician

Military service
- Allegiance: Israel
- Branch/service: Operations Directorate, Northern Command
- Years of service: 1978–2019
- Rank: Rav Aluf (Note: Equivalent to Lieutenant General. Rav Aluf is the highest military rank in the Israel Defence Forces (IDF).)
- Commands: Golani Brigade; Military Secretary to the Prime Minister; Judea and Samaria Division; Operations Directorate; Northern Command; Deputy Chief of the General Staff; Chief of the General Staff
- Battles/wars: 1982 Lebanon War; South Lebanon conflict (1982–2000); Second Intifada; 2006 Lebanon War; Operation Cast Lead; Operation Pillar of Defense; Operation Protective Edge

Gadi Eisenkot (Note: Also spelled as Eizenkot.) (Hebrew: גדי איזנקוט, [gaˈdi ˈajzenkot]; born 19 May 1960) is an Israeli military officer and politician serving as a member of the Knesset for Yashar. He has also served as the party's leader since its September 2025 founding. He led Yashar in the 2026 Israeli legislative election as the main challenger to Prime Minister Benjamin Netanyahu. From 2023 to 2024, he served as a minister without portfolio in Israel's unity government. As a military officer, he served as the 21st chief of staff of the Israel Defense Forces (IDF) from 2015 to 2019.

Eisenkot, who grew up in Eilat, pursued maritime studies and later served in the IDF's Golani Brigade. He holds a B.A. in history from Tel Aviv University and a post-graduate degree in political science from Haifa University. Married with five children, he resides in Herzliya. One of his sons, Gal, was killed in action during the Gaza war. Eisenkot has held various leadership roles in the Golani Brigade and other IDF divisions. He served as Prime Minister Ehud Barak's military secretary and later as the IDF's chief of staff. During his tenure as chief of staff, Eisenkot focused on strengthening IDF ground forces and implementing the "Gideon" multiyear plan, which emphasized force buildup.

Eisenkot advocates for a state rooted in national-Jewish values but with equal rights for all citizens. He opposes a two-state solution with the Palestinians, prioritizing the Jordan Valley and settlement blocs, and advocates a long-term ceasefire and demilitarization in the Gaza Strip. Eisenkot has emphasized the need for a robust security policy and internal unity in Israel, viewing domestic polarization as a significant threat. He advocates for reforms to strengthen the separation of powers in the Israeli government. Eisenkot indicated that he supports military service exemptions for up to three percent of Haredim enrolled at their yeshiva for religious studies but opposes the longstanding system that granted significant exemptions to ultra-Orthodox men following the October 7 attacks.

== Early life and education ==
Gadi Eisenkot was born in Tiberias, in northern Israel. He is the second of four children born to Meir and Esther Eisenkot, Jewish Moroccan immigrants from the town of Safi. His mother was born in Casablanca, and his father was born in Marrakesh. It is thought that the family name was originally Azenkot and was changed to Eisenkot by a clerk after his father immigrated to Israel. His parents subsequently divorced. Both went on to remarry, and Eisenkot has numerous half-siblings as a result.

Eisenkot grew up in the southern port city of Eilat, where his family moved to when he was a year old. His father was a miner who worked at the Timna Valley copper mines while his mother was a homemaker. He studied at Goldwater High School, majoring in maritime and mechanical studies. After high school he was drafted to the Israel Defense Forces (IDF) and served in the Golani Brigade.

Eisenkot holds a Bachelor of Arts in History from Tel Aviv University and a Master of Arts in Political Science from the University of Haifa. He also holds a Master of Strategic Studies from the United States Army War College. He was awarded an honorary Doctor of Philosophy by Reichman University in 2019.

== Military career (1978–2019) ==
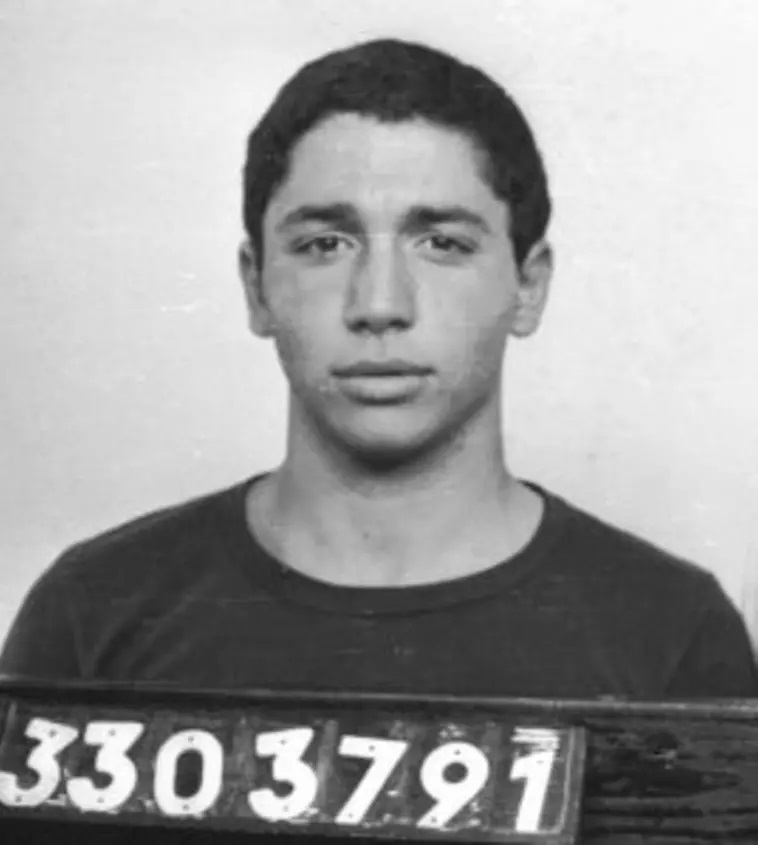
Gadi Eisenkot's IDF induction photo, 1978

Eisenkot with Moti Yogev and Shaul Mofaz during the Ephraim Brigade command handover ceremony, 1994

Eisenkot was drafted into the Israel Defense Forces in 1978, and stayed as a career officer after his mandatory service. He began his military service in the Golani Brigade, serving in it from 1978 to 1992. He served as a soldier, a squad leader, and a platoon leader. In 1980, he was wounded in a training accident while participating in a squad commander course when he was driving an armored personnel carrier and a machine gun accidentally fired into the driver's cabin. He recovered and returned to service. In the First Lebanon War, he served as a company commander in the Golani Brigade. During the South Lebanon conflict (1985–2000) he served as the brigade's Operations Officer and as the commander of the Golani Orev Company. Later, he served as the commander of the Golani Brigade's 13th Battalion, the Deputy to the Commander of the Brigade, and an operations officer of the Northern Command. Afterwards he commanded the Carmeli Brigade and the Ephraim Brigade. In 1997 he was appointed commander of the Golani Brigade, replacing Col. Erez Gerstein, and served in this position until 1998.

From 1999 to 2001, Eisenkot served as Military Secretary to the Prime Minister for prime ministers Ehud Barak and Ariel Sharon. He then commanded the 366th Division from 2001 to 2003. From 2003 to 2005 he commanded the Judea and Samaria Division, overseeing operations in the West Bank during the Second Intifada. From 2005 to 2006 he headed the Operations Directorate. After the conclusions exercise "joining of forces" Eisenkot led the formulation of the concept on which the IDF must severely damage the center of gravity of Hezbollah, the Dahiya neighborhood, as a key component for creating deterrence against Hezbollah.

After Maj. Gen. Udi Adam resigned in October 2006 amid criticism over his conduct in the 2006 Lebanon War, Eisenkot replaced him as head of Northern Command. In his years as the head of the Northern Command he emphasized the training of forces, strengthening the capacities of command and creating an appropriate operational response to threats from Hezbollah and Syria.

On 11 July 2011, the position was transferred to Maj. Gen. Yair Golan. Afterwards he served as Deputy Chief of General Staff in place of Maj. Gen. Yair Naveh, assuming office on 14 January 2013. On 28 November 2014, Defense Minister Moshe Ya'alon and Prime Minister Benjamin Netanyahu chose Eisenkot as the successor to Gen. Benny Gantz as the Chief of Staff of the IDF.

=== Chief of Staff of the IDF ===
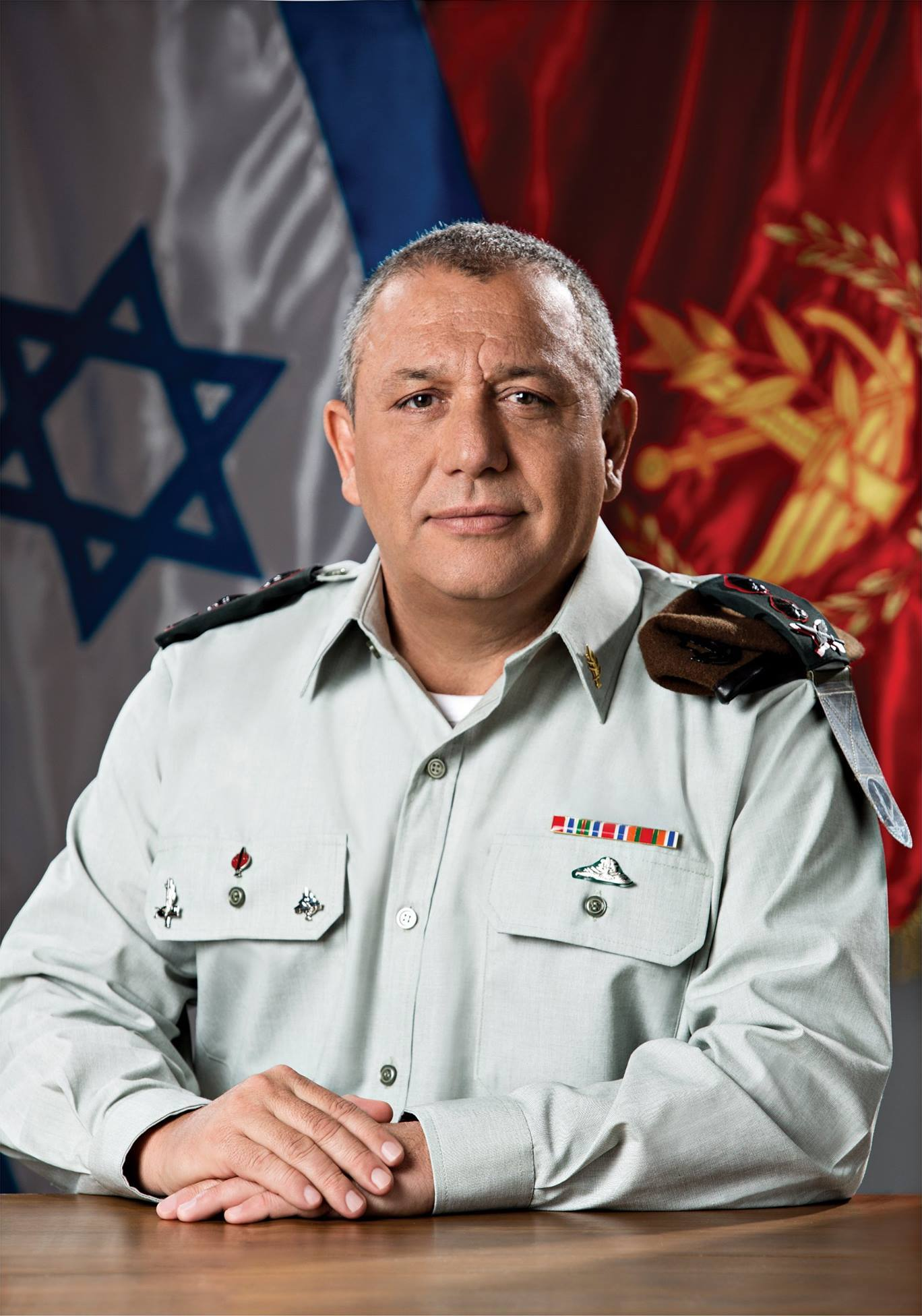
Eisenkot as Chief of the General Staff

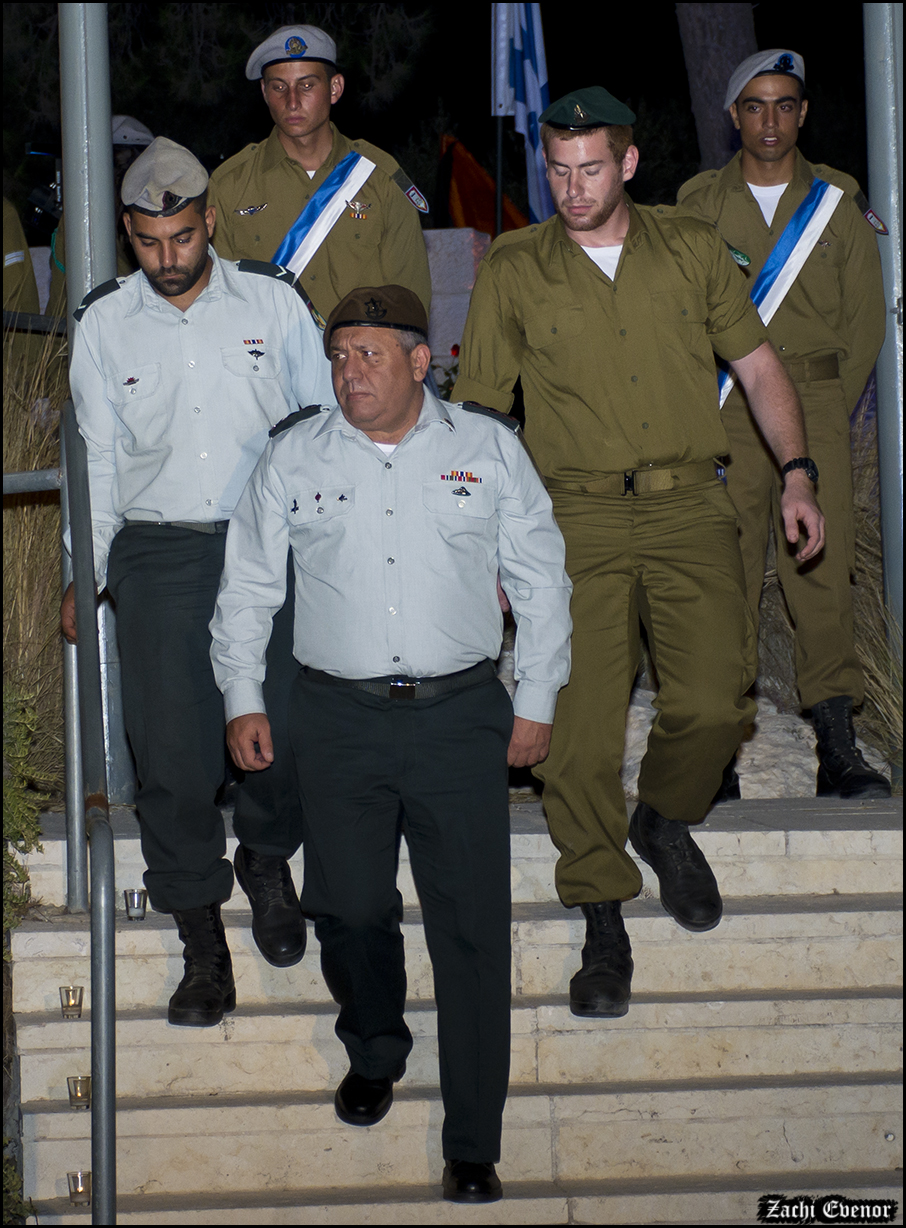
Eisenkot arriving at a memorial ceremony of the IDF Combat Engineering Corps, 2016.

Eisenkot assumed duties as the IDF Chief of the General Staff on 16 February 2015. Upon taking office, he shifted doctrinal focus back toward ground maneuver capabilities, infantry and armored training, and countering cross-border tunnels. Under his direction, the multi-year "Gideon" plan was formulated and approved in April 2016 to execute the operational concepts outlined in the formal military doctrine document "The IDF Strategy". Together, they aimed to optimize force buildup, eliminate redundancies, establish a cyber command, and anchor military strategy around swift conflict resolution through combined maneuver and firepower.

A core component of Eisenkot's tenure was the formalization of the Campaigns Between the Wars (CBW) doctrine: covert operations designed to weaken enemies, degrade capabilities, and postpone future conflicts between major engagements. A 2017 military study credited Eisenkot with reversing the IDF's overreliance on technology, "strikingly evident" during the Second Lebanon War, and restoring ground maneuver as the military's primary tool for defeating adversaries.

Eisenkot attempted to establish a cyber command in order to unify cyber operations divided between different units. The plan was ultimately scrapped in 2017. Instead, it was decided that the Computer Service Directorate, which subsequently became the ICT and Cyber Defense Directorate, would be boosted in capabilities and its cyber defense unit would become an operational command with the authority to act and respond.

During Eisenkot's tenure, the IDF attacked thousands of Iranian targets in Syria during the Syrian civil war in order to prevent Iranian entrenchment there. During the first few years of the war, Israel limited its attacks in Syria to striking Iranian convoys delivering weaponry to Hezbollah. Eisenkot dramatically increased the attacks in 2017 after receiving permission from the Israeli cabinet in order to prevent Iran from using a power vacuum left by the intervention against ISIL to establish regional hegemony. Israel launched a large number of airstrikes, as well as ground-based missile attacks and special forces raids, with Israeli attacks becoming near-daily occurrences. The full extent of the attacks was kept secret until Eisenkot publicly revealed the extent of them in 2019, stating that they had resulted in Iran withdrawing forces in Syria and transferring its efforts to Iraq. In 2018, after an Iranian drone crossed into Israeli airspace and was shot down, the IDF launched an attack on Tiyas Air Base, during which an Israeli fighter jet was shot down. Three months later, Iranian forces launched a rocket attack against Israeli positions in the Golan Heights, after which the IDF carried out an extensive series of airstrikes against Iranian targets in Syria codenamed Operation House of Cards.

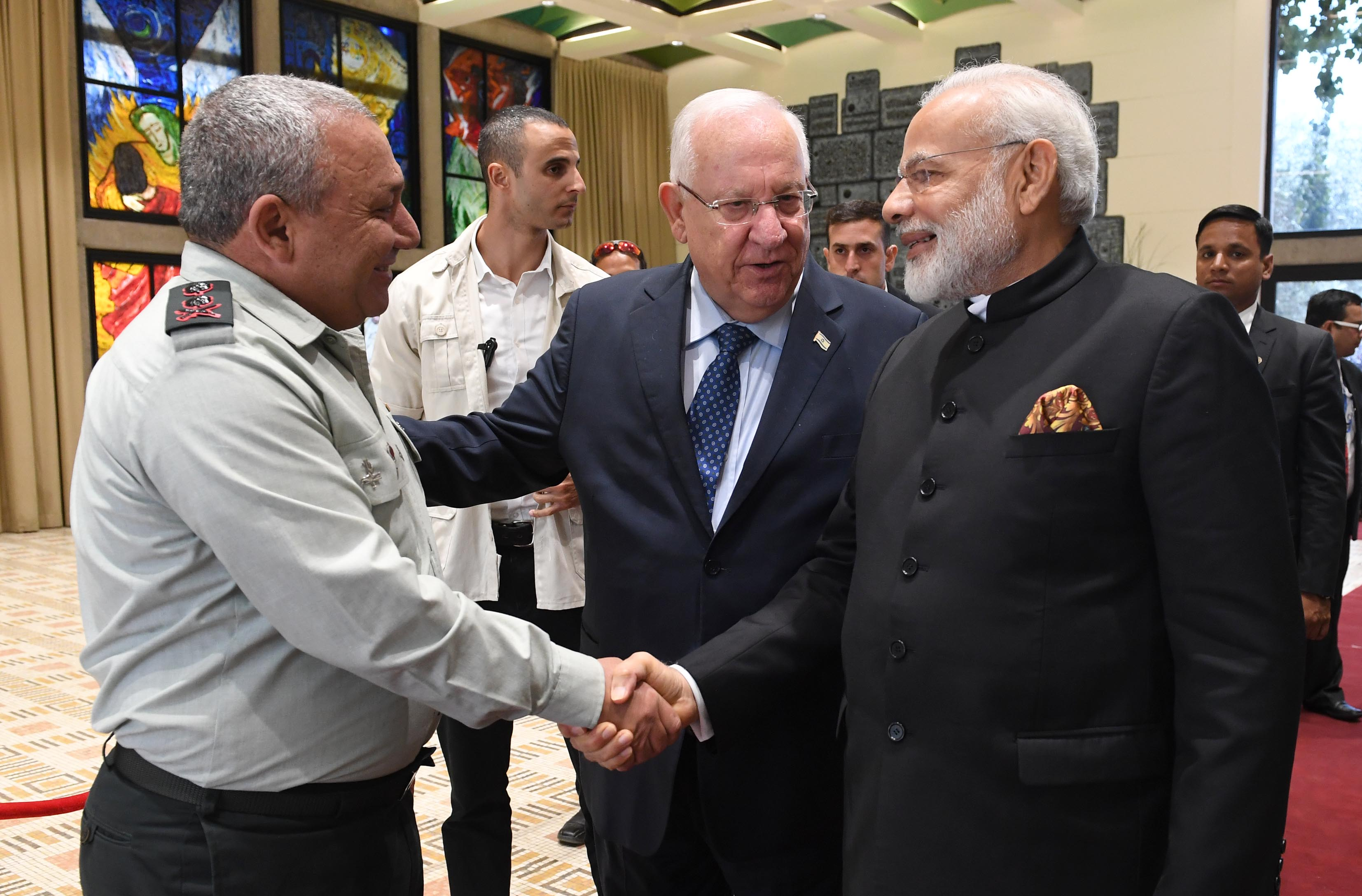
Eisenkot and Israeli President Reuven Rivlin with Indian Prime Minister Narendra Modi during Modi’s official visit to Israel, 5 July 2017

Eisenkot's tenure saw numerous clashes with the Palestinians. From 2015 to 2016, Israel faced the "Knife Intifada", a wave of stabbing and car ramming attacks by lone wolf Palestinian attackers in the West Bank and Israel. The wave of attacks was eventually contained. Eisenkot responded with restraint, refusing to allow curfews on West Bank towns or a shoot-to-kill policy, enabling hundreds of thousands of Palestinians to continue working in Israel and Israeli settlements. The 2018–2019 Gaza border protests, a series of demonstrations, some of them violent, along the Israel-Gaza border, began during his term. The IDF often used lethal force in response. In November 2018, two days of clashes between Israel and Hamas as well as other Palestinian factions in Gaza broke out following a botched Israeli covert operation in Khan Yunis. Eisenkot opposed launching an all-out war in Gaza, resulting in a confrontation with Defense Minister Avigdor Lieberman that eventually led to Lieberman's resignation.

In addition, Eisenkot was Chief of Staff during Operation Good Neighbor, in which the IDF provided humanitarian assistance to Syrians affected by the civil war, and Operation Northern Shield, during which underground Hezbollah tunnel infrastructure that extended from Lebanon into northern Israel was dismantled.

In August 2016, U.S. Marine Corps General Joseph Dunford presented Eisenkot with the Commander of the Legion of Merit award for his meritorious service and contributions to U.S.–Israel strategic cooperation.

Eisenkot handed over command to General Aviv Kohavi on 15 January 2019.

== Political career (2022–present) ==
Eisenkot with Israeli Prime Minister Benjamin Netanyahu, U.S. Secretary of Defense Lloyd Austin and Chairman of the Joint Chiefs of Staff Charles Q. Brown Jr. during a meeting in Tel Aviv, 18 December 2023

Following his retirement as Chief of Staff, Israeli media outlets reported that Eisenkot considered entering politics ahead of the 2021 election. Ahead of the 2022 election, Eisenkot joined the National Unity alliance, and was elected to the Knesset.

On 12 October 2023, he was sworn in as a minister without portfolio after his party joined the government following the outbreak of the Gaza war. Eisenkot left the government, along with the rest of National Unity, in June 2024.

The party announced on 30 June 2025 that Eisenkot would leave the party and resign his seat in the Knesset. He submitted his Knesset resignation on 2 July and was replaced by Eitan Ginzburg on 4 July. Eisenkot explained his reasoning for leaving at a press conference on 1 July, remarking that National Unity needed a "deep democratization process", which he argued had not taken place.

Eisenkot and Benny Gantz meet with U.S. Secretary of State Antony Blinken in Tel Aviv, 8 February 2024

In July 2025, Eisenkot said in an interview with Channel 12 that he might put himself forward as a prime ministerial candidate if it would give the "anti-Netanyahu bloc" an advantage in the next election.

On 16 September 2025, Eisenkot announced he would be founding a political party, "Yashar! with Eisenkot".

In January 2026, Eisenkot proposed a joint list for the election with Yair Lapid's Yesh Atid and the new party of former prime minister Naftali Bennett; according to Channel 12, he believed such a list could win around 40 seats. Bennett and Lapid instead announced a joint run without Yashar in April 2026. Eisenkot said he had been told of it only minutes before it was made public, and that "that's not how you build partnerships".

In May 2026, former Shin Bet director Yoram Cohen joined Yashar. The Knesset dissolved on 17 July 2026, and the election was set for 27 October, its scheduled date and the latest allowed by law. On 6 September, Hili Tropper merged his Zionist Home party into Yashar after ending its alliance with Yoaz Hendel's Reservists. The next day Yashar submitted its list to the Central Elections Committee, with Cohen in second place, confirming that it would run separately from Bennett and Lapid's Together alliance.

Yashar, which had polled at 9–11 seats in January 2026, led most opinion polls in the final weeks of the campaign, and Eisenkot became the opposition's leading candidate for prime minister. Yashar, Together, Yisrael Beiteinu and the Democrats agreed to coordinate their campaigns and prepare principles for a future government. Eisenkot supported making the leader of the largest party the bloc's candidate for prime minister and rejected a rotation arrangement.

Shortly after the closing of polls in the 2026 Israeli legislative election, Eisenkot said that "I will do everything in my power to form a Zionist government that drafts everyone", and that "This will be a government true to the principles I have set out all along: recognition of Israel as a Jewish and democratic state, committed to the values of the Declaration of Independence, committed to passing a law of service for all, and committed to dismantling Hamas." He described the initial exit polls as showing “a complete vote of no confidence in Netanyahu and the October 7 government by the Zionist majority and by most Israeli citizens.”

On 5 November, the Arab parties Joint List and Ra'am joined Eisenkot's bloc in recommending him for premiership, giving him 67 recommendations in total. Confirming that Eisenkot had received 67 mandates, President Isaac Herzog announced that he would reserve his decision of who to task to form a governing coalition until 8 November, saying "the authority granted to me by law is to determine who has the ability to form a government, and that is not entirely clear in light of the mutual vetoes between the blocs and within the blocs themselves.” On 7 November, Herzog confirmed that he would task Eisenkot to form a new government. Eisenkot formally received the mandate to form the next government from Herzog the following day at the Beit HaNassi in Jerusalem.

== Political views ==
Eisenkot emphasizes both national-Jewish values and equal rights for all citizens. He identifies internal domestic polarization as a more pressing threat to Israel than external foes like Iran, urging citizens to bridge political divides and resist divisive leadership. To ensure a balanced and functional political system, he also calls for reforms to strengthen the separation of powers within the government.

In 2020, Eisenkot advocated for a two-state solution with the Palestinians to maintain a Jewish-democratic state, while retaining major West Bank settlement blocs and the Jordan Valley. In 2025, following the 7 October attacks, he stated that he thinks that "a Palestinian state is not relevant after October 7", and expressed opposition to "talk[ing] about a state and a prize after this murderous event." He told The New Yorker in 2026 that he never subscribed to a "two states for two peoples" formula, asserting that those talking about "peace now" and a two-state solution fail to understand the deep-rooted nature of the religious-national conflict.

In dealing with the Gaza Strip, Eisenkot supports a long-term ceasefire agreement that includes the return of Israeli captives and demobilization of Hamas missile and rocket capabilities, and under these conditions, he agrees to rehabilitation measures for Gaza, including opening a seaport. He believes in a proactive and firm security policy to erode enemy capabilities and deter those who oppose Israel's existence.

During the 2026 election campaign, Eisenkot pledged to establish a state commission of inquiry into the failures surrounding the 7 October attacks and to introduce compulsory military or national service for all citizens. He also pledged to end Hamas rule in Gaza within 18 months, either by implementing Donald Trump's ceasefire plan or through what he called "creative" military operations.

Eisenkot indicated that he supports granting military service exemptions for up to three percent of Haredim enrolled at their yeshiva for religious studies but opposes the decades-old system that provided ultra-Orthodox men substantial exemptions.

During his 2022 election campaign, Eisenkot stated, "My worldview was and remains that full equality must be ensured and that all discrimination based on religion, race, sex, or sexual orientation must be fought. I have conducted myself according to these values throughout my life and in every position I have held." Eisenkot condemned settlers' attacks in the West Bank and blamed National Security Minister Itamar Ben-Gvir and Finance Minister Bezalel Smotrich for the worsening situation in the region.

== Personal life ==
Eisenkot is married to Hannah, whom he met at a sailing club when they were in high school. They married in 1984 and have five children. He resides in Herzliya, having moved there shortly after his wedding. One of his children, Master Sergeant Gal Meir Eisenkot, was killed in the Gaza war in December 2023, at age 25. Two of his nephews were also killed in the war. One, Sergeant Maor Cohen Eisenkot, was killed a day after Eisenkot's son Gal. The other nephew, Captain Yogev Pazy, was killed in November 2024.

== Honors and decorations ==
=== Military honors ===

First Lebanon War	Second Lebanon War	Operation Protective Edge

=== Foreign honors ===
- United States
  - Commander of the Legion of Merit (2016)
