= Eliezer Toledano =

Israeli major general (born 1973)

- אליעזר טולדנו
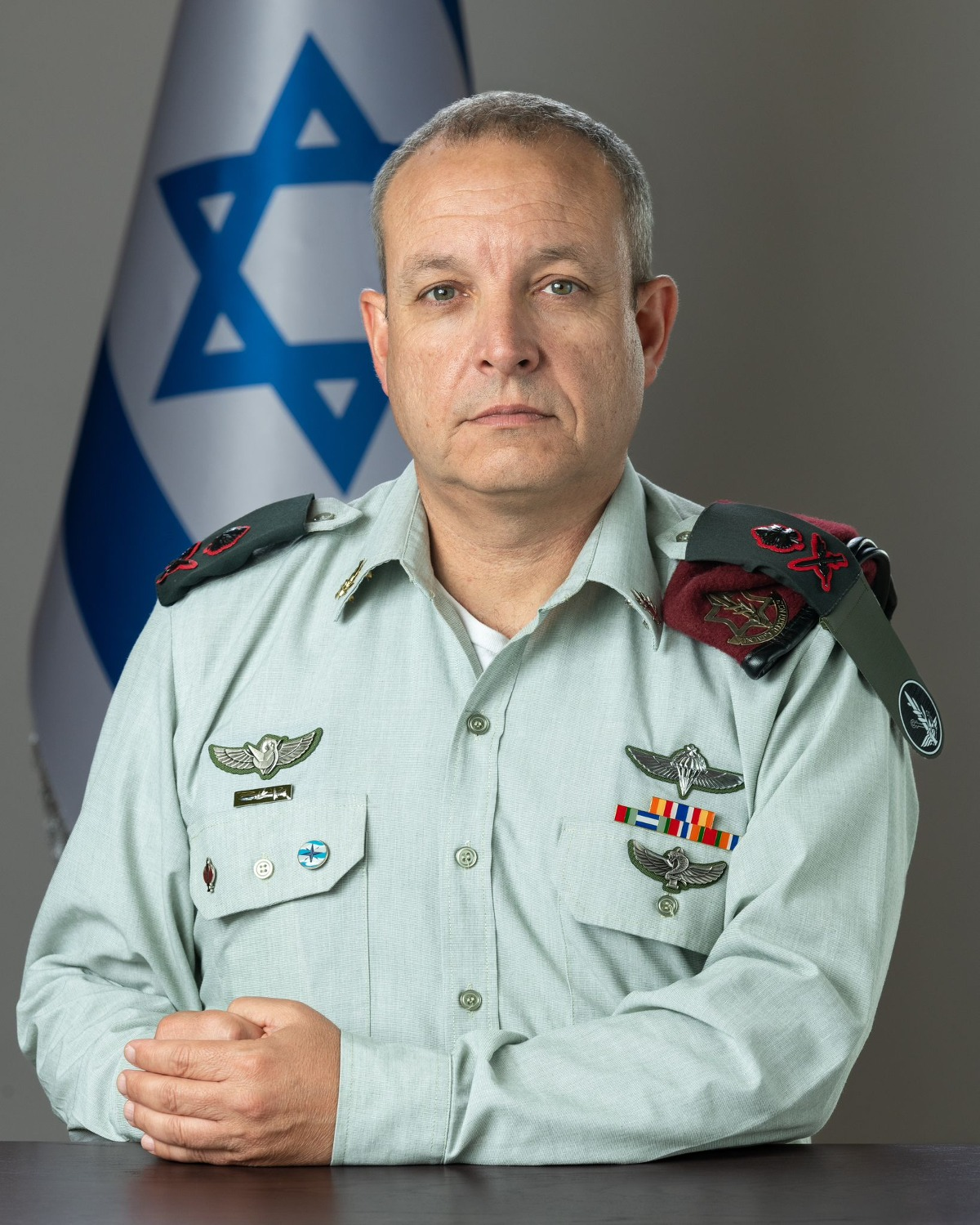
- Toledano in 2023
- Born: 12 October 1973 (age 53); Israel
- Military career
- Branch: Israel Defense Forces
- Service years: 1991–present
- Rank: Aluf (major general)
- Unit: Paratroopers Brigade
- Commands: 101st "Peten" (Elapidae) paratroop battalion, Maglan Unit, Reserve Paratroopers Brigade, Paratroopers Brigade, Military Secretary to the Prime Minister
- Conflicts: South Lebanon conflict (1985–2000); First Intifada; Second Intifada; 2006 Lebanon War; Operation Cast Lead; Operation Pillar of Defense; Operation Protective Edge; Operation Guardian of the Walls

Eliezer Toledano (Hebrew: אליעזר טולדנו; born 12 October 1973) is an Israeli Aluf (major general) who served as the commander of the Paratroopers Brigade, the Military Secretary to the Prime Minister, the commander of the Gaza Division, the commander of the Southern Command and head of the Strategy and Third-Circle Directorate of the General Staff of the Israel Defense Forces until it was closed in 2025.

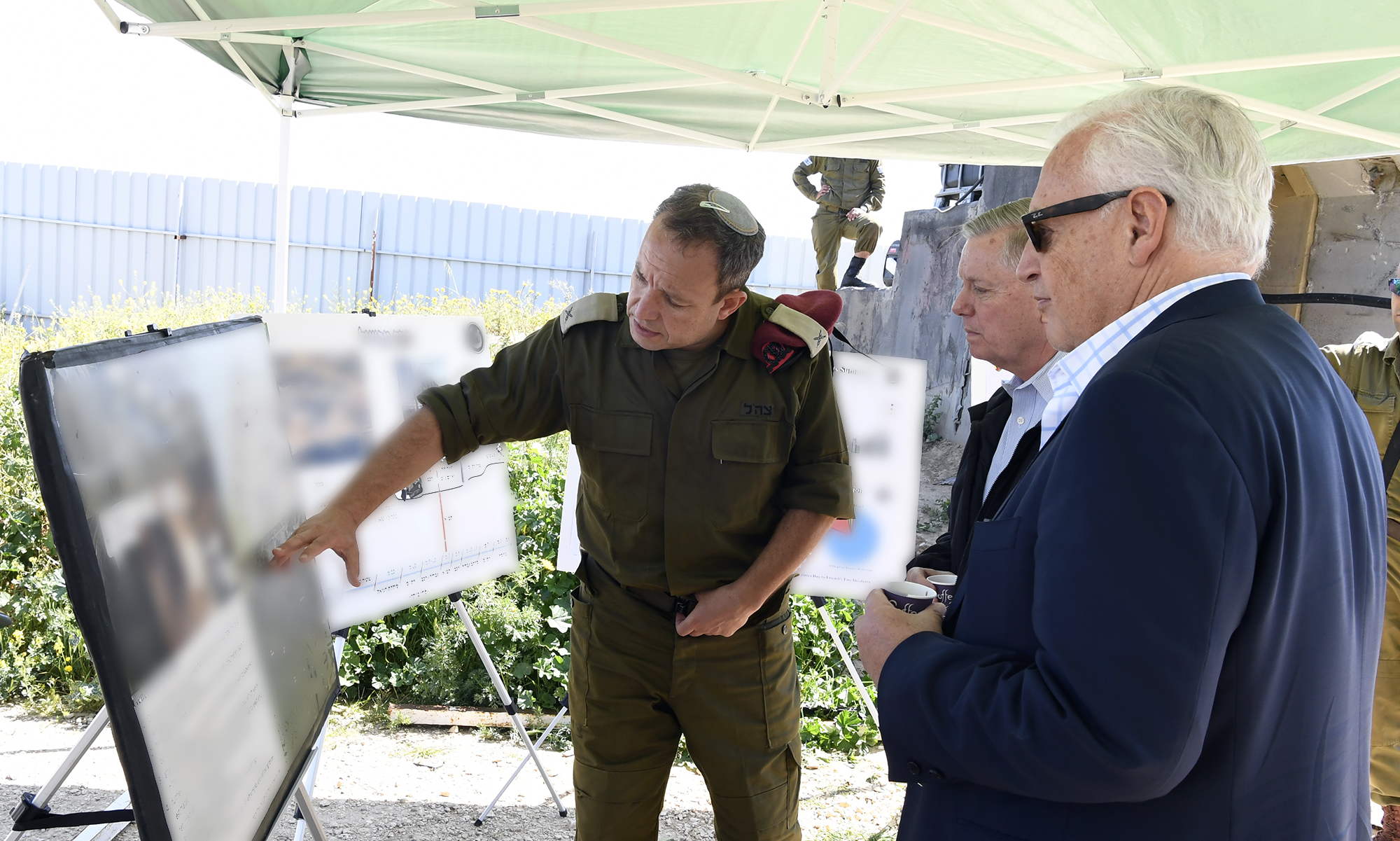
Toledano with Senator Lindsey Graham and Ambassador David M. Friedman, 2019

== Biography ==
Toledano, the son of Haim and Linda, natives of Morocco, was born in Jerusalem during the Yom Kippur War. He grew up in Kiryat Motzkin. He studied at the Bnei Akiva Yeshiva of Pirchei Aharon in Kiryat Shmuel, and later attended the ORT Kiryat Bialik Educational Campus. He was a member and counselor in the Bnei Akiva youth movement in his hometown.

=== Military Service ===
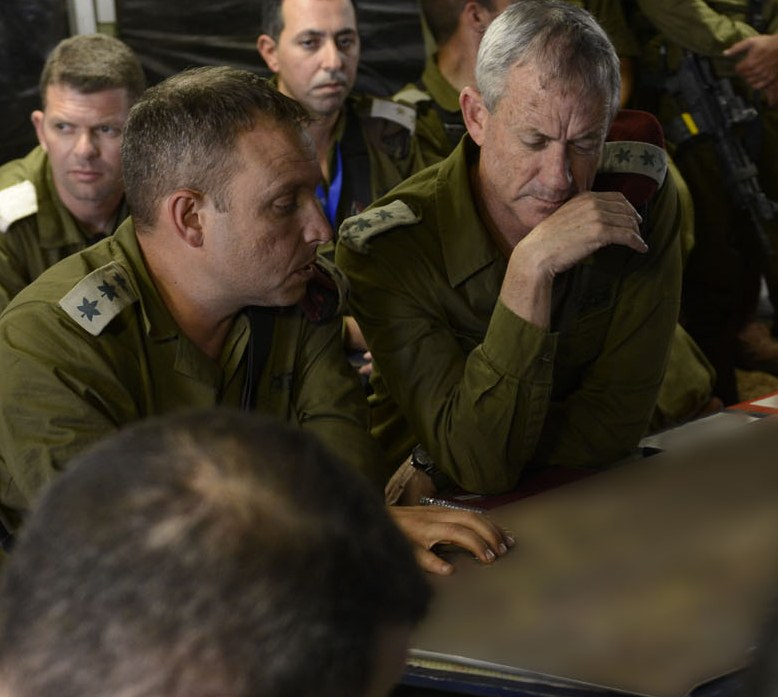
Eliezer Toledano (first from left) with Gen. Benny Gantz at the 35th Paratroopers Brigade command post in Operation Protective Edge

He enlisted in the IDF in November 1991, volunteered for the Paratroopers Brigade, and was assigned to 101st Battalion. He underwent combat training, the Infantry Commanders Course, and the Infantry Officers Course. Upon completing the course, he returned to the 101st Battalion and was appointed as a Platoon Commander. Later, he served as Deputy Company Commander, and subsequently was appointed Company Commander in the 101st Battalion. He later served as the battalion's Operations Officer (Katzin Agam). Afterward, he was appointed the training platoon commander in the elite Sayeret Matkal unit. In 2000, he began studying for a bachelor's degree in Economics and Philosophy at the Hebrew University of Jerusalem. At the beginning of Operation Defensive Shield, he interrupted his studies to join the fighting within the Paratroopers Brigade. After completing his studies, he was appointed Deputy Commander of 890th Battalion. After studying at PUM, he was appointed Deputy Commander of Maglan Unit.

In June 2005, he was promoted to the rank of Lieutenant Colonel and appointed Battalion Commander of the 101st Battalion, a role he held until 2006. During his command, he led the battalion in fighting Palestinian terrorism during the Second Intifada. In June 2006, he was appointed commander of the Maglan Unit and led it, among other operations, during the Second Lebanon War. At the start of the war, a force from the unit retrieved the bodies of a tank crew from Battalion 82 that was destroyed by an IED during the pursuit of the kidnappers. In the days that followed, mortar shells, recoilless rifles, and rockets were fired at Avivim, Yir'on, and other communities from the Jabal al-Dair area near Maroun al-Ras. A force from the unit crossed the border to search the area and attack the Hezbollah squads responsible for the fire. The force positioned itself in a dense, vegetation-covered area, where they spotted a metal door and camouflage netting spread over it (this area was later defined by the IDF as a "nature reserve"). They threw a hand grenade into the shaft, killing several terrorists. The remaining terrorists emerged from other shafts, and in the ensuing battle, two soldiers from the unit and eight terrorists were killed, including those killed in the first shaft by the grenade explosion. Later, Toledano proposed an operational plan to strike Hezbollah's rocket launchers, which was approved, and the unit successfully carried out Operation Beach Boys. For its actions during the war, the unit under his command received a unit citation from the commander of the Central Command, Gadi Shamni. He later led the unit in operations in the Gaza Strip. In 2008, he concluded his role. In 2009, he was appointed Operations Officer (Katzin Agam) of the Judea and Samaria Division and served in this position until 2011, while also completing the IDF Battalion Commanders Course.

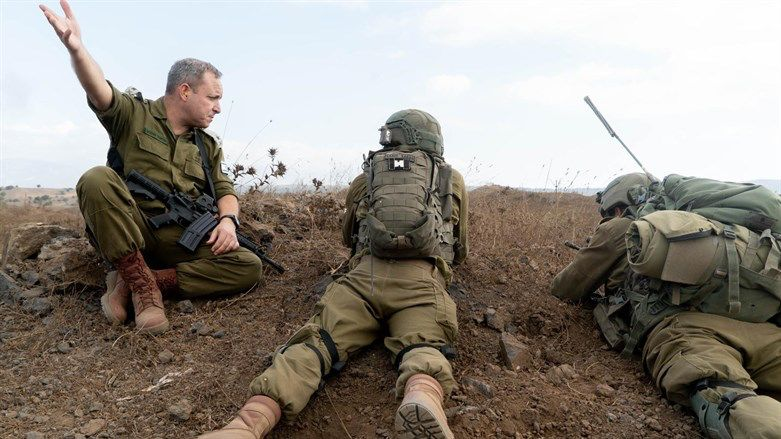

In 2011, he was promoted to the rank of Colonel and appointed commander of 226th Brigade, while simultaneously serving as commander of a training program in the IDF Battalion Commanders Course. He held these positions until 2013. On 16 May 2013, he was appointed commander of the Paratroopers Brigade, leading the brigade during Operation Brother's Keeper and Operation Protective Edge. During the operation, his brigade killed 141 terrorists in close combat and directed artillery fire that killed an additional 70 terrorists. They uncovered 47 combat tunnels and four offensive tunnels, and arrested seven terrorists. Nine soldiers from the brigade were killed during the fighting. He concluded his role on 1 July 2015.

On 3 September 2015, he was promoted to the rank of Brigadier General, and on 8 September, he assumed the role of the Military Secretary to the Prime Minister Benjamin Netanyahu. He served in this position until 16 August 2018. On 24 October 2018, he was appointed commander of the Gaza Division. He held the role until 2 August 2020.

=== Commander of the Southern Command ===
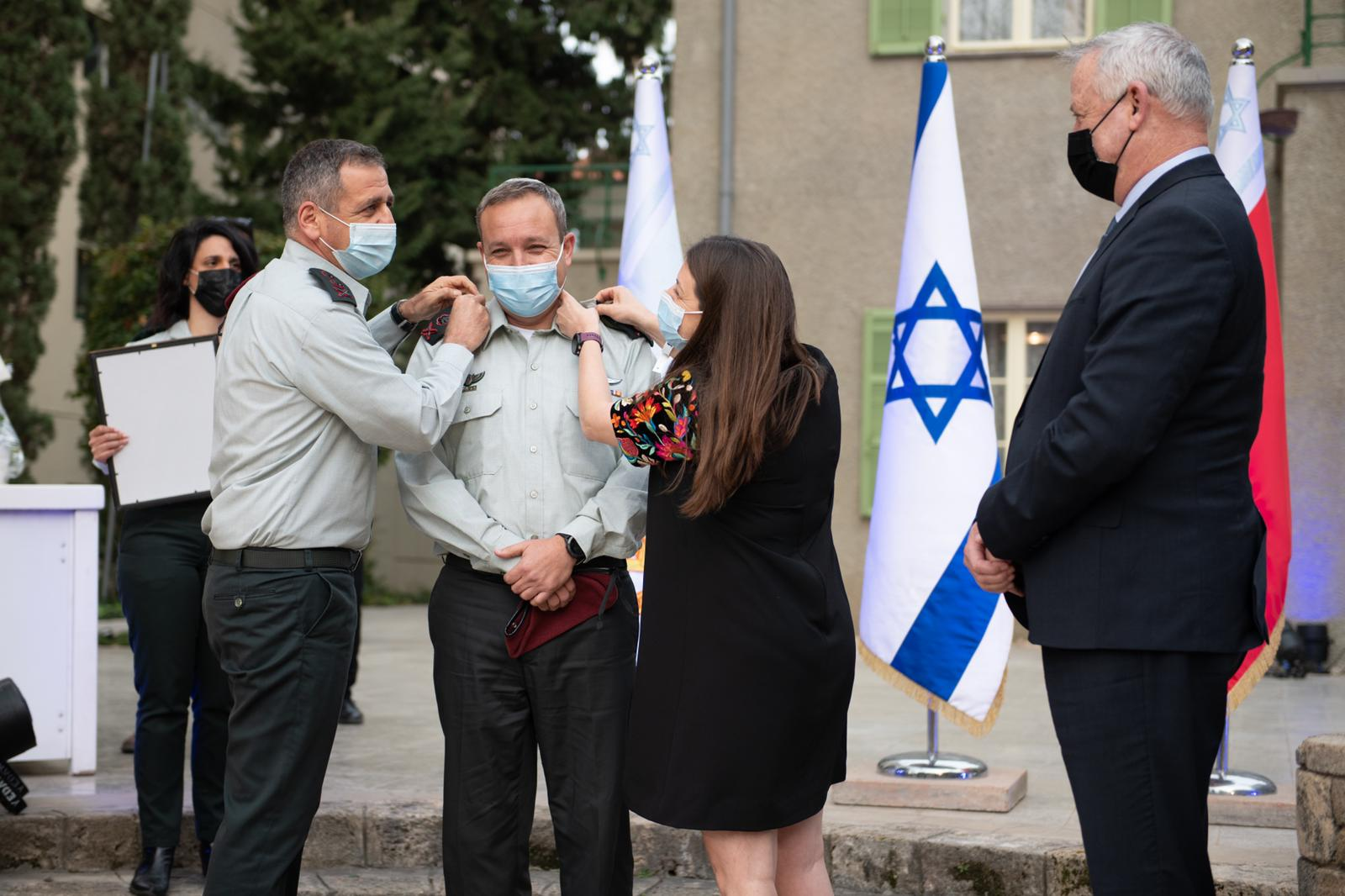
Rank awarding ceremony for Eliezer Toledano, March 2021, at the Ben-Gurion House in Tel Aviv

On 14 March 2021, he was promoted to the rank of Major General, and on 21 March, he assumed command of the Southern Command. He was an active participant in defining the sectoral security concept, particularly in the "Hourglass Plan" and the smart fence around the Gaza Strip. In May 2021, he led the command during Operation Guardian of the Walls, a round of fighting against terrorist organizations in Gaza, primarily Hamas, which lasted for 12 days and struck at the military infrastructure of the terrorist organizations. Most of the offensive military activity was carried out through surgical airstrikes over the Strip, while thwarting infiltration attempts by terrorist squads by the Gaza Division. On 14 May 2021, Operation Lightning Strike was executed, aimed at trapping hundreds of Hamas terrorists in tunnels (the "Metro" system) and eliminating them while they were holed up using advanced capabilities developed by the Air Force. The operation, originally designed for use in a broader strategic framework, was developed over years and relied on the element of surprise. The Southern Command Intelligence Officer warned in time that the ground deception had failed, but the operation proceeded regardless and did not achieve its goals, with the impact on Hamas being minimal. In an interview months later, Toledano admitted: "Few were killed in the Metro... fewer than I had hoped."

Following the operation, 2022 saw the quietest year in the Gaza envelope since 2005. In August 2022, the quiet was broken with the launch of Operation Breaking Dawn, which focused on fighting the Palestinian Islamic Jihad, not Hamas. The three-day operation reflected Toledano's operational approach, with Israel initiating a preemptive strike on the terrorist organization while imposing a lockdown on Gaza border towns to protect civilians. During the operation, targeted killings were carried out on the military commanders of the organization, Taysir al-Jabari and Khaled Mansour. In November that year, after being exposed to a possible Hamas surprise attack scenario called "Jericho Wall," Toledano held a classified discussion where he expressed his view that the ceasefire approach with the Gaza terrorist organizations was bound to fail, and that in his opinion, Israel would need to initiate a preemptive strike: "Since any campaign has a price, as long as the significant military advantage is maintained, we will seek to delay the next war. But along the timeline and enemy advancements, there comes a point where we will need to initiate a preemptive strike." He also supported the targeted killing of the Gaza Strip leader Yahya Sinwar as a preliminary Israeli move. Toledano's warnings, along with various alerts regarding the threat of a Hamas surprise attack, conflicted with the assessment of Military Intelligence and the Shin Bet, which believed that the organization was "deterred," influencing public discourse following the Gaza war.

On 3 May 2023, his appointment as head of the Strategic and Third-Circle Division was approved, which included responsibility for the Iranian arena. A week later, he led Operation Shield and Arrow, which began following rocket fire towards Israel a few days earlier and opened with three simultaneous targeted assassinations of senior Islamic Jihad officials. The operation lasted five days before a ceasefire was achieved. On 3 June, the Egypt–Israel border shooting occurred in his sector, after which Toledano met with senior Egyptian Army officials in Cairo for a joint investigation. Following the conclusions drawn from the incident investigation, the regional brigade commander was dismissed. On 9 July, he handed over command of the Southern Command to Major General Yaron Finkelman.

=== Head of Strategy Directorate ===
On 26 September 2023, Toledano assumed his role as head of the Strategy and Third-Circle Directorate. Two weeks later, the Gaza war began, during which he participated in planning the course of the war and attended the Israeli war cabinet meetings. In December, he traveled to the Pentagon to coordinate with the United States Department of Defense regarding the continuation of the war. During the war, he was responsible for coordinating the joint international defense system over Israel on the night of 14 April 2024, during the Iranian attack on Israel (April 2024). Following the resignation of Military Intelligence Directorate chief Aharon Haliva, Toledano was considered for the position, but ultimately Shlomi Binder was appointed.

In 2024, Toledano announced that he would retire from military service after his service as Head of the Strategy Directorate.

== Personal life and education ==
Toledano lives in the moshav of Beit Gamliel, is married to Merav, and is the father of five children. He holds a bachelor's degree in Philosophy and Economics and a master's degree in History and National Security, both from the Hebrew University of Jerusalem.

== External sources ==
- Amos Harel, Israel's Paratroopers Want to Know They Will Not Die in Vain, Haaretz, 22 April 2015. (Archived version)
- Head of IDF Paratroopers named as Netanyahu aide, The Times of Israel, 15 August 2015. (Archived version)
- IDF Editorial Team, The New Commanding Officer of the Southern Command, Israel Defence Forces, 9 July 2023.
- Amir Bohbot, General Staff knew Gaza fence couldn't stop a war, but still underestimated Hamas, The Jerusalem Post, 12 November 2023. (Archived version)
- Toi Staff, Report: Top IDF general advised preemptive strike against Hamas, year before 7 Oct, The Times of Israel, 8 January 2024.
