= Guy Markizano =

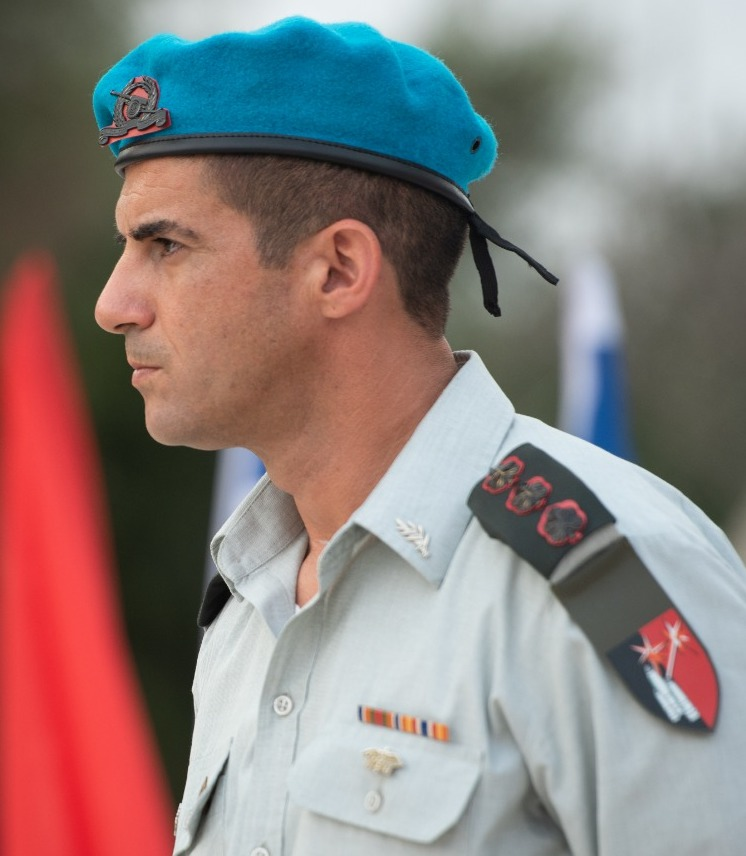

Guy Markizano (Hebrew: גיא מרקיזנו; born July 14, 1978) is an IDF officer with the rank of Aluf (Major General), who has served as the Military Secretary to the Prime Minister since June 2026. He previously served as Military Secretary to the Minister of Defense, Chief of Staff of the Northern Command, Commander of the Fire Pillar Formation, Commander of the Kidon Formation, Commander of Battalion 405, and Head of the Planning Department in the Ground Forces.

== Biography ==
Markisano was born in 1978 and was raised and educated in Ramat HaSharon. He is a graduate of Alon High School in the city.

In 1997 he enlisted in the IDF and was assigned to the Artillery Corps. He served as a combat soldier in the 55th Battalion of the 215th Brigade. After officers course, he served in the 403 Battalion and acted as deputy battery commander. He later served as a battery commander in the 403 Battalion. When the 403 regular-service battalion was disbanded and converted into a reserves battalion, he moved, together with one company, to the 601 Combat Engineering Battalion for a period of about a year. He was then appointed deputy commander of the 402 Battalion, including during the Second Lebanon War. He subsequently served as the operations officer of the 425 Brigade. After that, he was appointed head of the bureau of the Southern Command's commanding officer, Yoav Galant.

In 2010 he was promoted to the rank of lieutenant colonel and appointed commander of the 405 Battalion in the Golan Formation, serving in the role until 2012. In 2012 he was appointed commander of the ground-forces officers advanced training course at the Ground Forces Training Base (Bislamach), serving in the role until 2014. He was then appointed deputy commander of the Golan Formation between 2014 and 2015. In August 2015 he was promoted to the rank of colonel and appointed commander of the Kidon (Bayonet) Formation, serving in the role until August 2017. In August 2017 he was appointed commander of the Amud HaEsh Formation, a position he held until July 2019. In 2019 he was appointed head of the planning department in the Ground Arm. On August 3, 2020, it was decided to promote him to the rank of brigadier general and appoint him head of the Northern Command staff. Since 2023 he has served as the military secretary of the Minister of Defense, serving in the role under Defense Ministers Yoav Galant and Israel Katz. On June 4, 2026, Prime Minister Benjamin Netanyahu announced his selection of Markisano to serve as his military secretary. In this role he will be promoted to the rank of major general.
