= Military Secretary to the Prime Minister =

Israeli military advisor

- המזכיר הצבאי לראש הממשלה

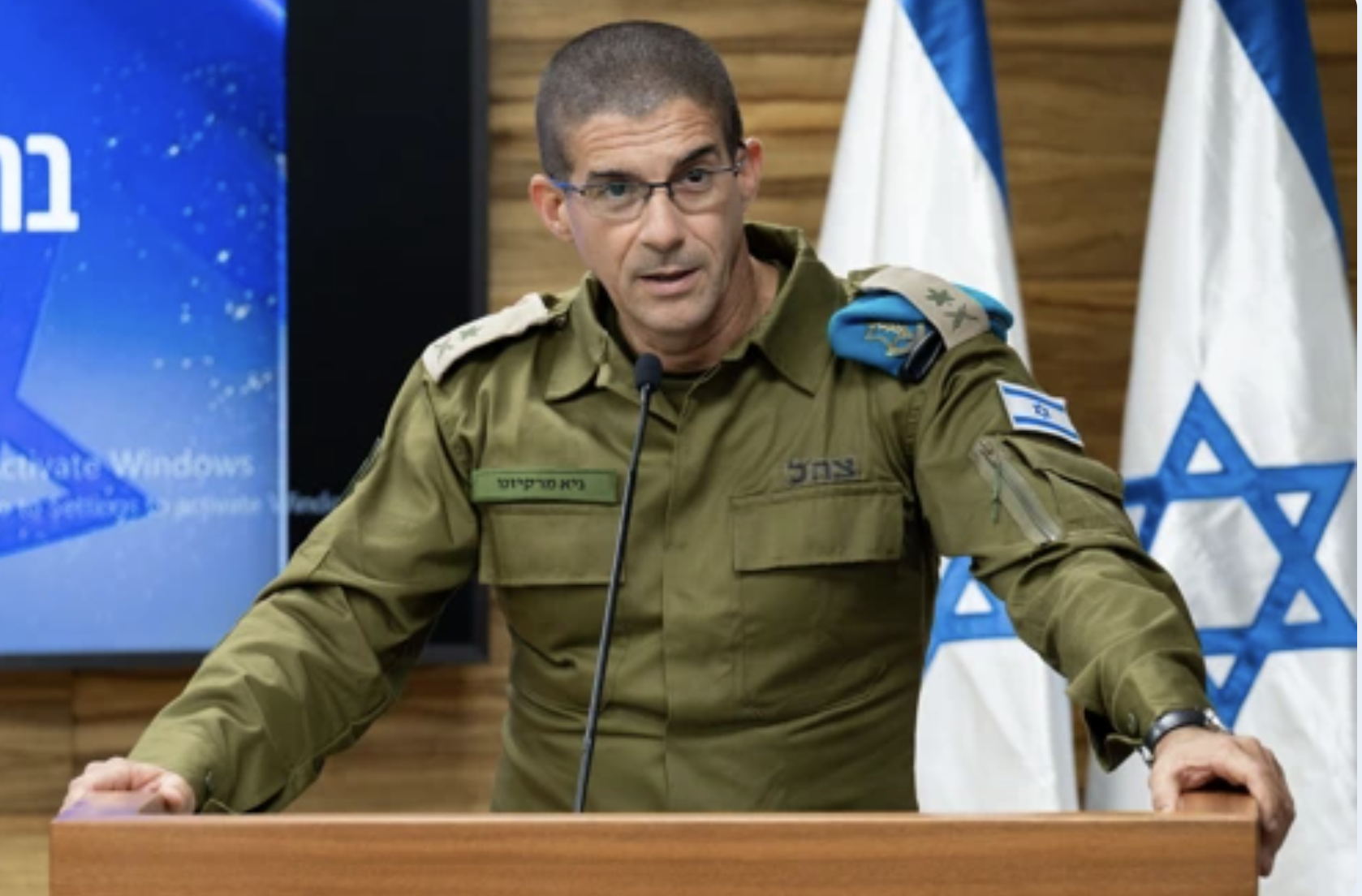
- Incumbent; Major General Guy Markizano since 4 June 2026
- Israeli Ground Forces
- Member of: The General Staff; Intelligence Community; Prime Minister's Staff
- Reports to: Prime Minister
- Appointer: Prime Minister by recommendation of the Chief of the General Staff
- Formation: 17 March 1948
- First holder: Nehemiah Argov

The military secretary to the prime minister (Hebrew: המזכיר הצבאי של ראש הממשלה, HaMazkir HaTzva'i Shel Rosh HaMemshala), is the senior military adviser to the prime minister of Israel on military and national security issues. As a member of the military staff, the position is privy to most products of the Israeli Intelligence Community. The incumbent position holder is Major General Guy Markizano.

== History ==
Earlier military secretaries held the ranks of lieutenant colonel (Hebrew: סגן אלוף) and colonel (Hebrew: אלוף-משנה). In later years, brigadier generals (Hebrew: תת-אלוף) and major generals (Hebrew: אלוף) have served in the position.

=== Position's influence ===
It has been suggested that the raising of status of the military secretary has resulted in military considerations unduly weighing upon Israel's national security policy at the expense of other considerations. It has been additionally suggested that to remedy this, the position of military secretary ought to be held by a lower rank. Critics of this view have suggested that the military secretary's influence follows that of other positions, namely, the National Security Council and the national security advisor.

== List of military secretaries ==
Portrait	Name (Birth–Death) Rank	Tenure	Notes	Ref.
	Nehemiah Argov נחמיה ארגוב (1914–1957); Colonel	1948–1957	Post officially established in 1950; previously Military Aide; Did not serve in 1954–55; Died by suicide while in office	
	Haim Ben-David חיים בן-דוד (1919–1967); Colonel	1957–1963		
	Yitzhak Nessyahu יצחק נסיהו (1926–2015); Colonel	1963–1966	Promoted to colonel in April 1964	
	Israel Lior ישראל ליאור (1921–1981); Brigadier General	1966–1974	Promoted to brigadier general in July 1969	
	Ephraim Foran (Note: Surname sometimes translated as "Poran") אפרים פורן (1931–1996); Brigadier General	1974–1981		
	Azriel Nevo עזריאל נבו (born 1948); Brigadier General	1981–1993		
	Danny Yatom דני יתום (born 1945); Major General	1993–1996		
	Zeev Livne זאב ליבנה (1945–2013); Major General	1996–1997		
	Shimon Shapira שמעון שפירא (born 1952); Brigadier General	1997–1999		
	Gadi Eisenkot גדי איזנקוט (born 1960); Brigadier General	1999–2001		
	Moshe Kaplinsky משה קפלינסקי (born 1957); Major General	2001–2002		
	Yoav Gallant יואב גלנט (born 1958); Major General	2002–2005		
	Gadi Shamni גדי שמני (born 1959); Major General	2005–2007		
	Meir Klifi מאיר כליפי (born 1959); Major General	2007–2010		
	Yohanan Locker יוחנן לוקר (born 1956); Major General	2010–2012		
	Eyal Zamir אייל זמיר (born 1966); Major General	2012–2015	Promoted to major general upon assuming office	
	Eliezer Toledano אליעזר טולדנו (born 1973); Brigadier General	2015–2018		
	Avi Bluth אבי בלוט (born 1974); Brigadier General	2018–2021	Promoted to brigadier general upon assuming office	
	Avi Gil אבי גיל (born 1972); Major General	2021–2024	Promoted to major general upon assuming office	
	Roman Gofman רומן גופמן (born 1976); Major General	2024–2026	Promoted to major general upon assuming office	
	Guy Markizano גיא מרקיזנו (born 1976); Major General	2026–		

== See also ==
- Director of National Intelligence, the equivalent in the United States
