= Haim Ben-David =

- חיים בן-דוד
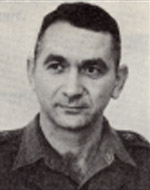
- Haim Ben-David
- Born: May 6, 1919; Vienna, Austria
- Died: November 22, 1967 (aged 48); Israel
- Burial place: Kiryat Shaul Military Cemetery
- Military career
- Allegiance: Israel
- Branch: Haganah; Israel Defense Forces
- Service years: 1938-1966
- Rank: Aluf
- Commands: Company commander of Carmeli Brigade; Battalion commander of Carmeli Brigade; Battalion commander of Golani Brigade; Chief of Staff of the Israeli Northern Command; Head of Administration; Military Secretary to the Prime Minister, 1957 – 1963; Head of the Manpower Directorate, July 1963 – July 1966
- Conflicts: 1936–39 Arab revolt in Palestine; 1948 Arab–Israeli War; Sinai War
- Other work: Israel Ambassador to Ethiopia

Haim Ben-David (Hebrew: חיים בן-דוד; May 6, 1919 – November 22, 1967) was a major general in the Israel Defense Forces, the second Military Secretary to Prime Minister David Ben-Gurion, and the head of the Manpower Directorate. After his military service, Ben-David was appointed ambassador to Ethiopia where he was killed in a plane accident in line of duty.

== Early life and education ==
Ben-David was born in Vienna, the capital of Austria in 1919. He studied Hebrew at the local Jewish community which was headed by Tzvi-Peretz Hayot at the time. Soon after, Ben-David joined the Gordonia, a Zionist youth movement and in 1938 he immigrated to Israel. Soon after arriving in Israel, Ben-David joined the Haganah where he aided Jewish immigrants during the Aliyah.

== Career ==
Ben-David became one of the first fighters in the Special Night Squads watching over the Mosul–Haifa oil pipeline in the Jezreel Valley. He eventually settled in Beit She'an valley where he became the area's first commander of Hish.

After the formation of the Carmeli Brigade on February 22, 1948, he became a company commander. During the 1948 Arab–Israeli War Ben-David fought in the Battle of Ramat Yohanan. He participated in Operation Dekel and Operation Hiram in the Western Galilee in an attempt to free Yehiam.

In October 1951, he was appointed assistant Chief of General Staff under the command of Mordechai Maklef. In 1953 he was appointed to organize the Department of Human Resources under the Manpower Directorate. In 1955 he was appointed Battalion commander of Golani Brigade, a position he held for a year.

Ben-David became the Military Secretary to the Prime Minister under the command of David Ben-Gurion following the suicide of Nehemiah Argov. He held that position for five years while the Lavon Affair intensified. Following the resignation of David Ben-Gurion in 1963, Ben-David was appointed Head of the Manpower Directorate. In April of '64 Ben-David was promoted to Aluf rank.

=== After his release and plane accident ===
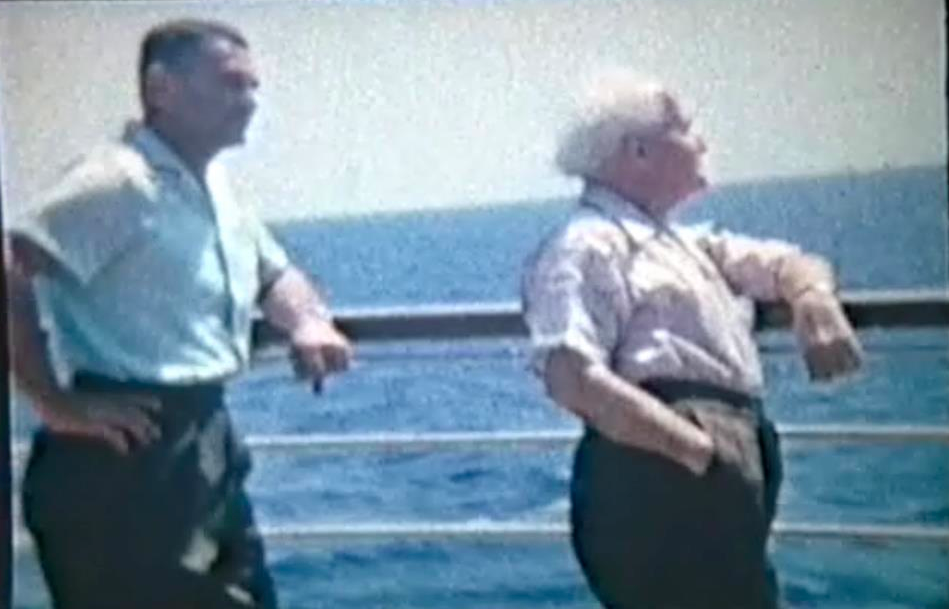
Haim Ben-David (left) and David Ben-Gurion

After his release from the military in 1966, Ben-David was appointed Israel's ambassador in Ethiopia. In November 1967 Ben-David was killed in a plane accident while flying from Addis Ababa to an Israeli farm as part of the Food and Agriculture Organization of the United Nations. Ben-David was married and had three sons. He is buried in Kiryat Shaul Military Cemetery. A street in the Yad Eliyahu neighborhood in Tel Aviv is named after him.
