= Jacob Gil =

Israeli architect and town planner

Jacob Gil (Hebrew: יעקב גיל) is an Israeli architect and town planner

== Biography ==
Gil studied in the Technion – Israel Institute of Technology in Haifa and graduated with honors in 1961.

After graduating, he moved to Denmark and participated in the planning of the Albertslund neighborhood, in the suburbs of Copenhagen.

Later on, he worked in Lufenfeld-Gemerman's office (of architects Moshe Lufenfeld & Giora Gemerman) and Yaski-Alexandroni's office, a period during which he focused mainly on the planning of dwellings, town planning and hospitals.

Early in his career, he worked in partnership with architect Eli Lipsky. During this collaboration Gil and Lipsky have participated in public competitions and in the planning of educational institutions and dwellings.

In 1970, Jacob Gil became a partner in the Yaski-Gil-Sivan office. During these 20 years of partnership, Gil was responsible for the planning of new towns and neighborhoods, university campuses, rehabilitation centers, hospitals, sports facilities, public institutions, office buildings, shopping malls, research & development facilities, hotels and thousands apartments both conventional and industrialized.

In 1990 he established the architecture firm Gil Architects, along with his wife, the interior designer Michal Oren. The office's work includes the planning of hospitals, laboratories, medical centers, museums, office buildings, shopping malls, villas etc.

== Awards ==
Gil won architectural awards with A.Yaski:

- Rokach Prize (named after Israel Rokach), for the planning of the Beit haLochem, Tel Aviv (1975)
- Kaplan Prize (named after Eliezer Kaplan), for the planning of the Eisenberg hospital, Jaffa (1976).

== Professional achievements ==
=== Since 1990, as director of Gil Architects with Michal Oren ===
- Master plan north Netanya, Kiryat Sanz
- 170 housing units for young couples, Netanya
- R&D facility for EMC Corporation, Tel Aviv
- Commercial center, Pardes Hanna
- Senior citizens complex, Tel Aviv
- Shalvata psychiatric hospital, Hod Hasharon
- 180 housing units for young couples, Beit Shemesh
- Medical center, Savyon
- 500 housing units for Minrav ltd, El'ad
- Kazin center - hi-tec facilities, Ra'anana
- Religious community center, Netanya
- Central laboratories for the Israeli Ministry of Health, Jerusalem
- Home for life for autistic children, Ra'anana
- Private villa, Tel Aviv
- SPHERA design center, Bucharest, Romania
- Jerusalem Psychiatric Center - master plan, Jerusalem
- Jerusalem Psychiatric Center - patients wards, Jerusalem
- Museum of Yemenite Jewish heritage, Rehovot
- Hartzfeld rehabilitation hospital, Gedera - general upgrading
- Shalvata psychiatric hospital - 3 wards, Hod Hasharon
- Yoseftal Medical Center-emergency+master plan, Eilat
- 120 housing units, Kfar Saba
- City center master plan, Ra'anana
- Prestigious villas, Ra'anana, Even Yehuda

=== 1970-1990 as partner at Yaski-Gil-Sivan architects & town planners ===
- Orek office building, Ramat Gan
- Negev shopping Mall, Beersheba
- Ocean dwelling tower, Herzliya
- Tel Aviv University Electronic labs, Tel Aviv
- Dekel country club, Tel Aviv
- Aizenberg Hospital, Jaffa, (Kaplan prize)
- Ben Gurion university Engineering department, Beersheba
- Israel Electric Company head office, Tel Aviv
- Capital city of Nigeria, Quarters I, J, K, N, Abuja, Nigeria
- IBM Israel office tower, Tel Aviv
- Lowenstein Rehabilitation Hospital, Ra'anana
- Hebrew University Sinatra students center, Jerusalem
- Beit Halohem war veterans Rehabilitation Center, Tel aviv, (Rokach prize)
- Tel Aviv University - students dormitories, Tel Aviv

=== Before 1970 ===
- Hartzfeld Rehabilitation Geriatric Hospital, Gedera, planning with Yaski, at the end of 1960s
