= Strategy and Third-Circle Directorate =

Subdivision of the Israel Defense Forces

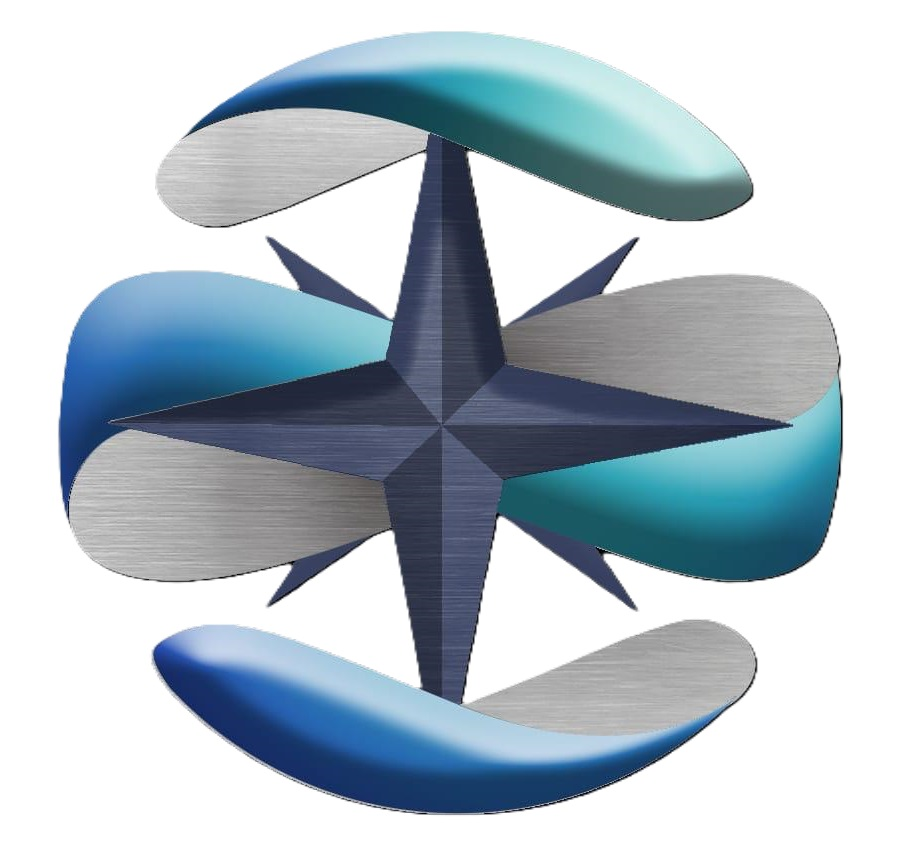
The insignia of the Strategy and Third Circle Directorate

The Strategy and Third-Circle Directorate was a Directorate in the General Staff of the Israel Defense Forces, formed in 2020 as part of the then-Chief of Staff Aviv Kohavi five-year development plan and disbanded in 2025 under the Chief of Staff Eyal Zamir.

== Details ==
The Directorate is made to concentrate the activity of the IDF in relation to Israel's third circle enemies (those with which it doesn't share a border), chief among them being Iran. As such the Directorate is also nicknamed The Iran Command. Heading the Directorate is a senior IDF officer in the rank of Aluf, equivalent to Major general.

With the creation of the Directorate two Divisions, originally of the Planning Directorate, were subordinated to it: The Strategic Division - Responsible for short and long-term strategic planning, and the International Cooperation Division (ICD) - responsible for the IDF relations with foreign armed forces, peacekeeping forces and international organizations. Both divisions are headed by officers in the rank of Tat-Aluf (Brigadier general).

Along with these two divisions, the Directorate includes the Iran Headquarters, led by an officer in the rank of Aluf Mishne (Colonel), responsible for the concentration and coordination of all military efforts in the Iran–Israel proxy conflict.

Serving as Head of the Directorate since September 2023 is Aluf Eliezer Toledano.

In March 2025, hours after taking office, Chief of General Staff Eyal Zamir decided to disband the directorate and transfer its wings to other divisions in the General Staff. The directorate was finally disbanded on March 31, 2021, with all of its divisions transferred to the Planning Directorate.
