= Gonzalo Gil =

Argentine footballer

Personal information
- Full name: Gonzalo Gil
- Date of birth: September 8, 1989 (age 37)
- Place of birth: Buenos Aires, Argentina
- Height: 1.86 m (6 ft 1 in)
- Position: Striker

Youth career
- –2007: Campo Chico
- 2007–2008: River Plate

Senior career*
Years	Team	Apps	(Gls)
2008–2012	River Plate	4	(0)
2010–2011	→ Ñublense (loan)	7	(1)
2011	→ Olaria (loan)	4	(0)
2012–2015	Fénix de Pilar		
2015	Defensores de Belgrano	12	(2)
- * Club domestic league appearances and goals

Gonzalo Gil (born September 8, 1989) is a retired Argentine footballer, who played as a forward.

== Career ==
Gil started playing amateur football with the team of Campo Chico, the gated neighbourhood where he lived with his family. In 2007, a member of the directive board of Argentine Primera División giants River Plate watched him play and asked him to join the club's youth divisions. In 2008, playing for River's reserves, he scored the winning goal in the 1–0 victory over Boca Juniors' reserves in the Superclásico. He debuted with the first team under the guidance of coach Diego Simeone during the 2008 Apertura on a 0–1 defeat to Gimnasia y Esgrima de Jujuy.

For the 2010–11 season, Gil was loaned along fellow River Plate companion Matías Díaz to Chilean Primera División side Ñublense.
