= The Inter-war Campaign =

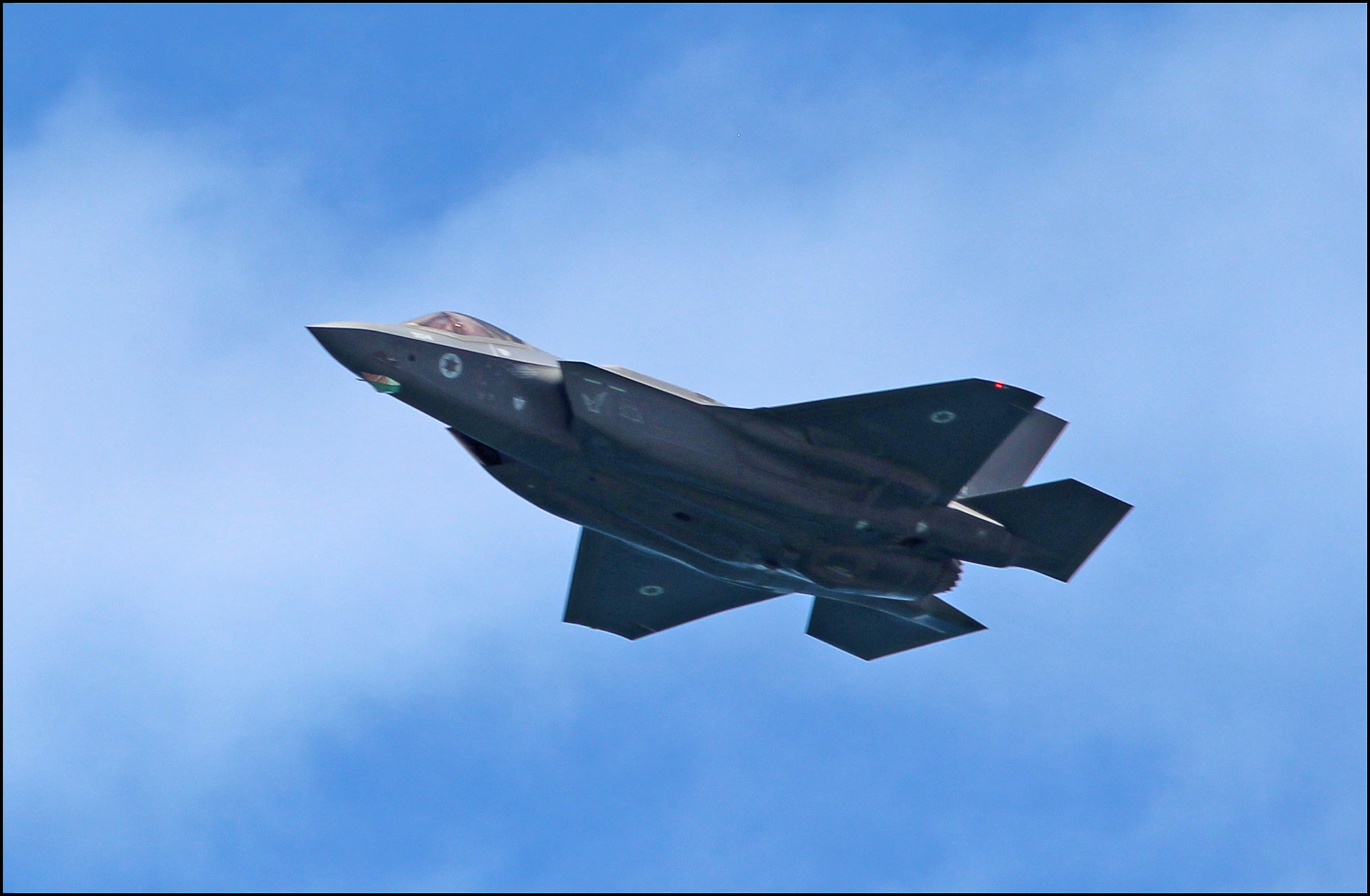
Air Force Fly By, Beaches of Tel Aviv-Yaffo, Israel 71st Independence day

The Campaign Between the Wars (or CBW or the Inter-war Campaign or IWC, Hebrew: המערכה בין המלחמות or מב"ם lit. "military campaign between wars") is an Israeli military doctrine regarding the targeted covert inter-war campaign waged by the State of Israel. This is done through the IDF and the Israeli Intelligence Community, by preventing Israel's enemies, whomsoever they may be, from developing capabilities that will enable them to violate Israel's balance of deterrence through detecting and selectively destroying emerging threats to Israel's security.

Among the activities attributed to Israel: the 2007 strike on a suspected nuclear reactor in Syria (Operation Outside the Box), the assassination of Syrian General Muhammad Suleiman (although not publicly attributed to Israel, only that Israel was consulted on the assassination), Imad Mughniyah, the military commander of Hezbollah and his son, and Mahmoud al-Mabhouh. The Israeli attack in Sudan (2009) during Operation Cast Lead, the May 2013 attacks on Iranian arms shipments to Hezbollah in Damascus, the January 2013 attack on the Syrian arms convoy in the Rif region of Damascus, the February 2014 attack on the Syrian arms convoy to Hezbollah in Baalbek, activities against the Iranian nuclear program, and the delivery of about 800 bombs against 200 targets across Syria in 2017–2018.

== See also ==
- History of Israel
- History of the Israel Defence Forces
- List of Israeli assassinations
