= Avi Gil (IDF officer) =

Israeli military officer (born 1972)

- אבי גיל
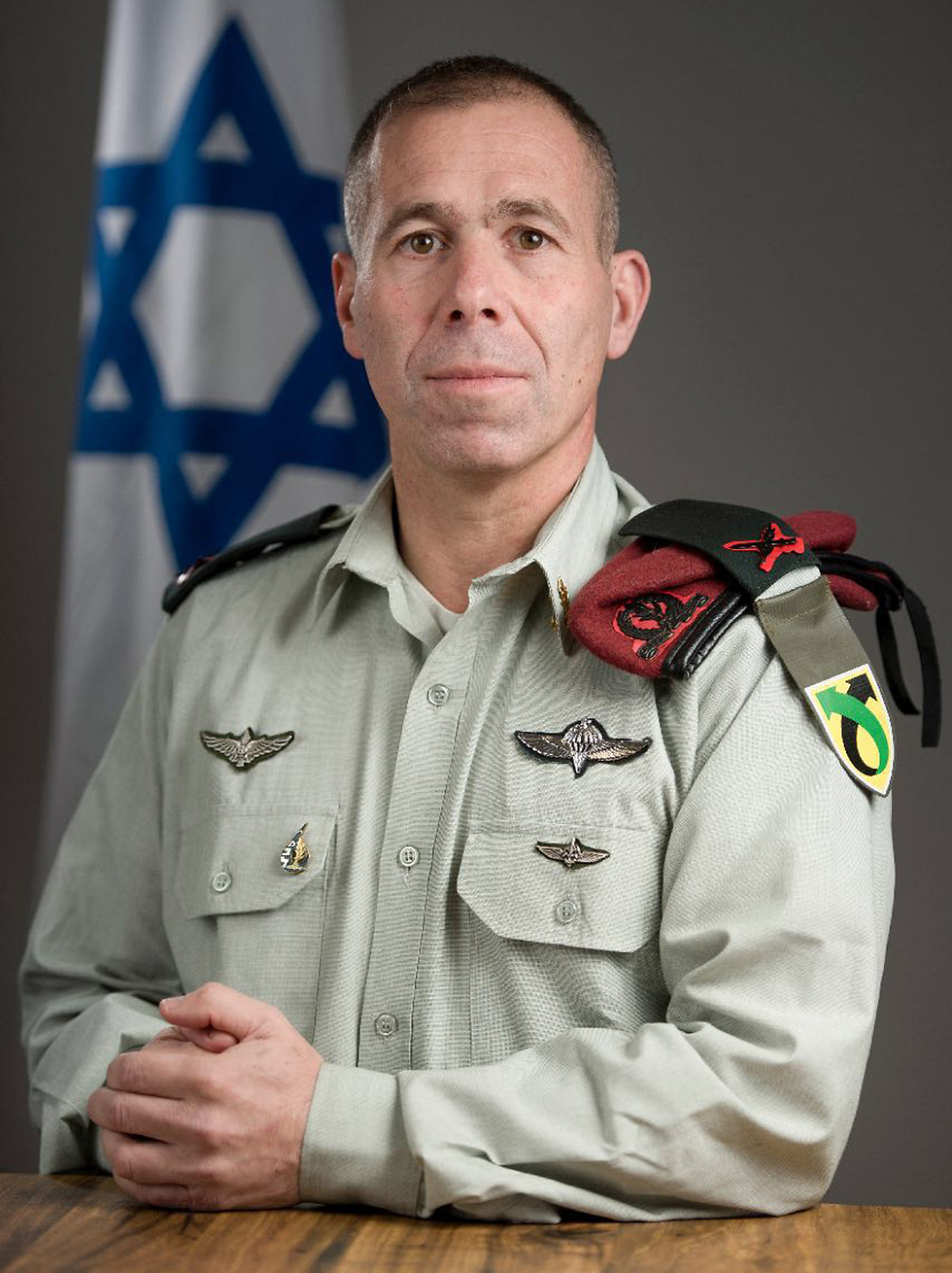
- Born: March 6, 1972 (age 54); Jerusalem, Israel
- Military career
- Allegiance: Israel
- Branch: Israel Defense Forces
- Service years: 1990–present
- Rank: Aluf (major general)
- Conflicts: South Lebanon conflict (1985–2000); First Intifada; Second Intifada; 2006 Lebanon War; Operation Cast Lead; Operation Pillar of Defense; Operation Protective Edge; Operation Guardian of the Walls

Avi Gil (Hebrew: אבי גיל; born March 5, 1972) is an Israel Defense Forces (IDF) general with the rank of aluf, who served as the Military Secretary to the Prime Minister. Previously he served as head of the Martial Theory Division in the Operations Directorate, commander of the Ga'ash Formation, commander of the Idan Formation, commander of Bahad 1, operations officer of the Southern Command, and commander of the Ephraim Brigade.

== Biography ==
Gil was born and raised in Jerusalem. He enlisted in the IDF in August 1990, volunteered for the Paratroopers Brigade, and was assigned to Battalion 890. He underwent combat training, an infantry NCO course, and an infantry officers course. After completing the course he returned to Battalion 890 and was appointed a platoon commander. Later he served as a company commander in the battalion, during Dror Weinberg's tenure. Subsequently he served as a platoon commander at Bahad 1. He was then appointed commander of the Paratroopers Anti-Tank Company between 1999–2000, leading it in fighting in southern Lebanon. After studying at the Command and Staff College, he was appointed operations officer of the Paratroopers Brigade.

In 2003 he was promoted to lieutenant colonel and appointed commander of the Paratroopers Reconnaissance Battalion, leading it in fighting against Palestinian terrorism in the Second Intifada, completing his role in 2005. Subsequently, he was appointed commander of the Duvdevan Unit, serving from 2005–2007. During his command of the unit, he was reprimanded by the commander of the Central Command, Yair Naveh, over the way he handled four soldiers in the unit who refused to take part in operational activity. He then served as an IDF attaché in the Marines between 2007–2009.

On November 22, 2009, he was promoted to colonel and appointed commander of the Ephraim Brigade, a position he held until 2011. In 2011 he was appointed operations officer of the Southern Command, serving among other roles in Operation Pillar of Defense, completing his role in 2013. On July 14, 2013, he was appointed commander of Bahad 1, leading it among other operations in Operation Protective Edge, serving in this position until August 18, 2015. Afterwards he was a student at the National Security College in the 43rd class (2015-2016). On March 16, 2016, he was promoted to brigadier general and appointed commander of the Eiden Formation, concurrently in June 2017 being appointed commander of the company and battalion commanders course, serving in these roles until January 31, 2018. On March 18, 2018, he was appointed commander of the Ga'ash Formation, serving until June 3, 2020. In 2020 he was appointed head of the Martial theory Division in the Operations Directorate, a position he filled until July 2021.

On July 29, 2021, he was promoted to aluf and appointed military secretary to the Prime Minister.
