= Israeli Special Forces' Operations in 2006 =

Operations by Israeli special forces during the 2006 Lebanon War

IDF Special Operations
- Part of the 2006 Lebanon War
Date	July 12, 2006 – August 19, 2006
Location	Lebanon
Result	Hezbollah victory

Belligerents
Israel	Hezbollah

Units involved
Sayeret Matkal is the commando unit of the Israeli General Staff and is directly subordinate to the Israeli Military Intelligence Directorate (AMAN).; Shayetet 13 (Flotilla 13) is the commando unit of Israeli Navy.; Shaldag is the commando unit of the Israeli Air Force.; Egoz is a commando unit created in 1995 specifically for fighting Hizbullah.; Maglan is a secretive counter-guerrilla unit.	

Casualties and losses
Two senior officers and five soldiers were killed	

Israeli Special Forces Operations in 2006 were part of the Second Lebanon War. Several commando units of the Israel Defence Forces launched dozens of operations against Hizbullah targets in Lebanon. Most of these were never publicized and many may have consisted of intelligence-gathering probes into Lebanese territory.

== Occupation of Maroun al-Ras ==
An 18-man Maglan commando unit was ordered to attack a Hizbullah position on a hill near Maroun al-Ras. A further 76 Maglan soldiers were kept in reserve. The target was a recoil-less gun positioned near a former IDF outpost called Shaked, that had been firing at the Israeli military base at Avivim. The Maglan fighters climbed the hill before dawn and started to search for the Hizbullah position. Suddenly the Israeli soldiers realized that they had walked into a "Nature Reserve", a defensive system of bunkers, tunnels, concealed firing positions and CCTV surveyance.

The Maglan force, of 18 soldiers, was surrounded and in the ensuing clashes, two Maglan fighters were killed, and nine others were wounded. The others, including the commanding officer, froze in panic. Maj. Amit Ze'evi, who took part in the mission as an outsider, took over command, slapping several soldiers into action. Reinforcements were quickly dispatched from the Maglan forces held in reserve.

Further reinforcements were sent in quick succession. The paratroopers brigade was called in, but it in turn appeared to get into trouble. The Egoz special force unit was ordered to relieve the paratroopers. Tank regiments from several brigades were called in, to help evacuate the dead and the wounded and were attacked by Sagger missiles, injuring several tank crew members. By the end of the day thousands of Israeli soldiers were operating inside Lebanon.

After a week of fighting, the IDF had gained control of most of the village. By then eight Israeli soldiers had been killed, seven of whom belonged to special forces units (Maglan and Egoz). After the battle of Maroun al-Ras, strict rules were implemented. No vehicles were allowed into Lebanon, except heavy tanks (such as Merkava) or heavy Armoured Personnel Carriers (such as Achzarit). Israeli troops were not allowed to advance in daylight. Israeli forces were also forbidden from attacking Hizbullah Nature Reserves.

== First Baalbek operation ==
Operation Sharp and Smooth was a joint operation between Sayeret Matkal, the commando unit of the General Staff and the Shaldag, the commando unit of the Israeli Air Force. During the night 1-2 August a combined force of 200 IDF commandos landed outside the city of Baalbek in eastern Lebanon. One force occupied a local hospital, Dar al-Hikma, believed by IDF to have contained an Hizbullah headquarter. The other force searched al-Usaira neighbourhood and conducted some arrests. The whole operation was completed within 4 – 6 hours. Many sources claim that the actual target of the raid was the capture or killing of senior Hizbullah leaders, but this was never officially clarified.

The IDF initially claimed to have killed 10 Hizbullah operatives and taken another five Hizbullah prisoners. Israel later admitted that the five prisoners were civilians and released them three weeks later. According to Human Rights Watch 10 Lebanese civilians (including a whole family of Kurdish migrant workers) and four armed combatants (two from Hizbullah and two from the Lebanese Communist Party), were killed in the Israeli attack. According to an official report of the Lebanese Internal Security Forces, 16 Lebanese were killed (two of whom from Hizbullah) and 13 were injured.

== First Tyre Operation ==
During the night between 4 – 5 August, a force from Shayetet 13, the commando force of the Israeli Navy, landed on a beach north of the city of Tyre in south Lebanon. The Israeli force attacked a second-floor apartment in an apartment building in the outskirts of the city. The Israeli force met violent resistance from the building and surrounding areas. According to statements from the IDF between six and ten Hizbullah fighters were killed, while Hizbullah only conceded one fatality. Ten Israeli soldiers were wounded in the firefight.

The target was a local Hizbullah leader, in charge of the launching of missiles. IDF initially claimed to have killed the leader, but later acknowledged that he got away. Hezbollah resumed rocket launching from the site within hours of the raid.

== Second Tyre Operation ==
Three days later, 40 IDF commandos launched another attack in the Tyre area of south Lebanon. This time the target was the coastal hill-top village of al-Bayyada, south of Tyre. The target seems to have been Hizbullah rocket launchers. The attack led to a firefight but no further details of this raid has been released by the IDF. According to Petrelli the commandos came from Shayetet 13.

Ten years after the Second Lebanon War, right-wing Israeli news site Walla! published a story about a Maglan operation called "Operation Beach Boys". It was based on interviews with three anonymous commanding officers of the Maglan unit. According to this report, dozens of Maglan soldiers were airlifted, early August, into South Lebanon, by helicopter. After hiding from a passing Hezbollah squad, the soldiers began calling in airstrikes against Hezbollah rocket launchers, as well as headquarters, trucks, ammunition dumps, and other military infrastructure. According to an opinion piece in Jerusalem Post by Gal Perl Finkel a total of 150 Hezbollah targets, including 40 rocket launchers, were destroyed. The operation lasted 11 days before the soldiers were withdrawn, as a ceasefire came into effect.

== Second Baalbek operation ==
Sayeret Matkal commandos launched a second operation in the Baalbek region, about a week after the declaration of the cease fire in Lebanon. On 19 August, a force dressed up in Lebanese army uniforms was landed by helicopter close to the town of Bodai. The Israelis were confronted by Hizbullah forces and forced to abandon the mission and evacuate its forces.

The commander of the IDF unit, Lt. Col. Emmanuel Moreno, was killed in the firefight, while two of his soldiers were wounded. Three Hizbullah fighters were also killed in the clash. Israel claimed that the aim of the operation was to prevent arms smuggling into Lebanon. Lebanese sources suggested that the target of the operation was Mohammad Yazbek, a senior Hizbullah leader who had his office in the town.

== Evaluation ==
Prof. Kober (2006) maintains that the IDF operated under a number of false assumptions and beliefs that led to the failure of IDF to achieve its aims. Among them was the belief that the air force and special forces, together could "control" the territory of south Lebanon. There would be no need to conquer it. This would prove fatal, since there was no possibility to stop short range rockets without actually occupying the territory and destroying Hizbullah’s firing positions.

Winograd Commission’s report discussing "special operations" was mostly classified. Only a page and half were published in the official report. Its conclusions, however, are clear. Among senior levels of both Israeli politicians and military, there were exaggerated expectations that special operations would play a decisive role in the outcome of the war. This perception may have "contributed to the indecision at the political level". The decentralized organization of IDF's units of special forces also prevented their efficient use in the war. The Winograd commission characterized the relatively limited use of special forces to suppress Hizbullah rocket fire as "astonishing".

According to Israeli missile expert Uzi Rubin, Israeli special operations "[o]bviously… neither stopped the rocket fire nor slowed it down" but may have contributed, among other factors, to a shift of launching sites, away from the western sector. However, looking at the numbers, Rubin finds no such effect.

Petrelli writes that the special operations' "tactical and strategic impact on the outcome of the conflict was negligible".The main aim of the special operations seems to have been the capture of senior Hezballah leaders. In this regard the operations failed. As far is known, no Hizbullah commander was captured or killed by special forces' operations. The three highest ranking Hizbullah commanders killed in the war (Khalid Bazzi, Muhammad Qanso and Muhammad Surour) were all killed by air strikes. (See Hezbollah Commanders). No Hizbullah fighter was captured by special forces during the war. In fact, only four Hizbullah fighters were captured by IDF forces during the whole war. They were all captured by regular IDF forces during the battles of Ayta ash-Shaab, Shihin and al-Ghandouriya.

Leslau writes thar while "the SOF [Special Operations Forces] conducted impressive operations… which demonstrated the weakness of Hezbollah’s rear, they had no strategic utility and did not affect the progress or outcome of the war. They did not reduce the number of rockets fired against Israel, or weaken significantly the strength of Hezbollah’s military force". The then-Chief of Staff Dan Halutz admitted that the "efficacy of the use made thereof was mediocre". Prof. Kober writes that "The cumulative effect of the special units… and their contribution to the war effort was very limited."

Stratfor concluded in an analysis of the raid in Baalbek that Israel took large risks and allotted huge military resources in carrying out the raid "well in excess of its achievements." Former chief of staff Moshe Ya'alon, a sharp critic of IDF conduct during the Lebanon war, questioned whether the raid on Baalbek was "justified in terms of risk, cost and benefit" and whether it was not simply "an adventure."

A recently retired member of the IDF General Staff characterized more than half of the wartime special missions as "feel good" operations marginally relevant or even counterproductive to the overall campaign.

== IDF fatalities in Special Operations in 2006 ==
Maglan fighters killed 19 July 2006 in Maroun al-Ras

- St.-Sgt. Yonatan Hadasi, 21, of Kibbutz Merhavia
- St.-Sgt. Yotam Gilboa, 21, of Kibbutz Maoz Haim

Egoz fighters killed 20 July 2006 in Maroun al-Ras

- Maj. Benjamin (Benji) Hillman, 27, of Maccabim Re'ut
- St.-Sgt. Refanael Muskal, 21, of Mazkeret Batya
- St.-Sgt. Nadav Baeloha, 21, of Karmiel
- St.-Sgt. Liran Saadia, 21, of Kiryat Shmona
- St.-Sgt. Yonatan (Sergei) Vlasyuk, 21, of Kibbutz Lahav

Sayeret Matkal officer killed 19 August 2006 in Buday, Baalbek

- Lt.-Col. Emanuel Moreno, 35, of Moshav Tlamim

== Sources ==
- Bar-Zohar, Michael; Nissim Mishal (2015). No Mission Is Impossible - The Death-Defying Missions of the Israeli Special Forces. Ecco.
- Blanford, Nicholas (2011). Warriors of God, Inside Hezbollah's thirty-year struggle against Israel. New York: Random House.
- Human Rights Watch (September 2007). Why They Died: Civilian Casualties in Lebanon during the 2006 War (PDF) (Report). Human Rights Watch.
- Kober, Avi (2006), The Second Lebanon War, September 28, 2006, BESA Center Perspectives Paper No. 22
- Kober, Avi (2008), "The Israel defense forces in the Second Lebanon War: Why the poor performance?", Journal of Strategic Studies, 31: 1, 3 — 40
- Leslau, Ohad (2010), "Worth the Bother? Israeli Experience and the Utility of Special Operations Forces", Contemporary Security Policy 31:3.
- Matthews, Matt M., "We Were Caught Unprepared: The 2006 Hezbollah-Israeli War", The Long War Series Occasional Paper 26, U.S. Army Combined Arms Center Combat Studies Institute Press Fort Leavenworth, Kansas, 2006
- Murphy, Brian J. No Heroic Battles: Lessons of the Second Lebanon War
- Petrelli, Niccolò (2012), "The missing dimension: IDF special operations forces and strategy in the Second Lebanon War", Small Wars & Insurgencies, 23:1, 56-73
- Rubin, Uzi (2007), The Rocket Campaign against Israel during the 2006 Lebanon War, Begin -Sadat Center for Strategic Studies, Mideast Security and Policy Studies No. 71.
