= Avraham Yaski =

Israeli architect (1927–2014)

Avraham Yasky
- אברהם יסקי
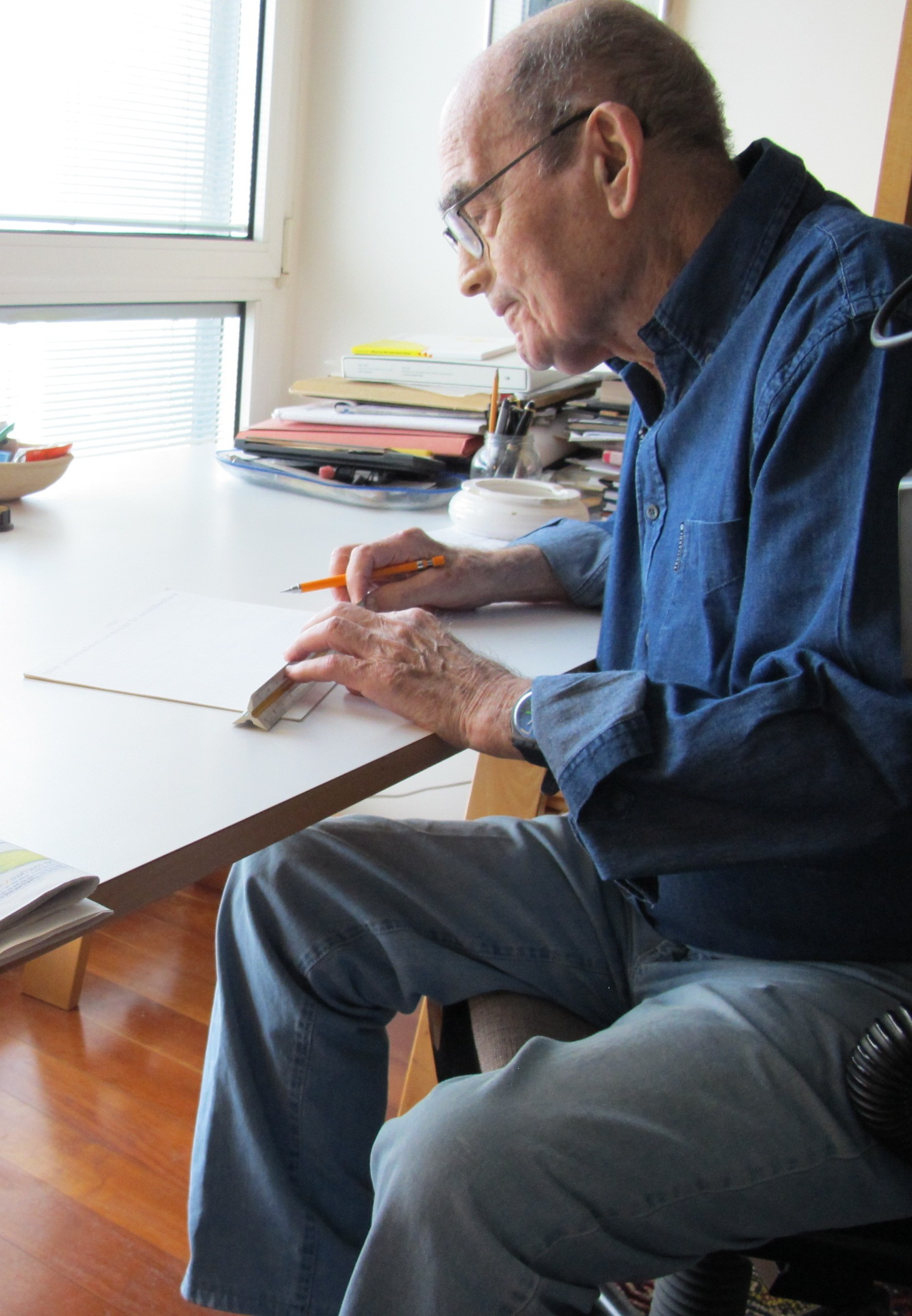
- Avraham Yasky in 2011
- Born: April 14, 1927; Chişinău, Romania (now Moldova)
- Died: March 28, 2014 (aged 86)
- Education: Technion
- Occupation: Architect
- Notable work: Azrieli Center, YOO Towers, Tzameret Towers

Avraham Yasky (Hebrew: אברהם יסקי; April 14, 1927 – March 28, 2014) was an Israeli architect.

== Biography ==
Yasky was born in Chişinău, Romania (now Moldova) on 14 April 1927. He immigrated to the Mandatory Palestine with his family in 1935. Yasky studied at the Technion. Early in his career he worked in the office of Arieh Sharon. At the age of 25 he made the plans for Rabin Square with Shimon Povsner, and later the Tel Aviv City Hall on the square. Early works by Yasky, such as the "quarter-kilometer apartments" of 1960 with Amnon Alexandroni, were primarily of concrete.

In 1965, Yasky founded the architectural firm now known as Moore Yasky Sivan Architects. From 1987 to 1991 he was an assistant professor at the Technion. In 1994, he established the school of architecture at Tel Aviv University where he was the head of the department until 1998. As of 2006, Moore Yasky Sivan Architects is the largest architecture firm in Israel with 73 employees. With this firm, Yasky contributed significantly to the urban development of Tel Aviv. Projects such as the Azrieli Center created a chapter in the city's architectural history that highlighted the skyscraper and skyline. Later work by Yasky shifted somewhat from the use of concrete, in the era of brutalist architecture, to a brilliant architecture emphasising glass, "[a]nd yet, he unhesitatingly points to the "gray years" of building the country with exposed concrete - of which he made such widespread and amazing use - as the best period of his life and in the life of Israeli architecture.".

Yasky died on March 28, 2014, from natural causes at the age of 86.

== Awards ==
In 1982, Yasky was awarded the Israel Prize, in architecture.

== See also ==
- Architecture of Israel
- Housing in Israel
- List of Israel Prize recipients
