= María Ángeles Gil =

Spanish statistician

María Ángeles Gil Álvarez (born 1953) is a Spanish statistician whose research applies fuzzy mathematics and fuzzy random variables in statistics. She is a professor at the University of Oviedo, in the Department of Statistics and Operations Research and Mathematics Didactics.

== Education and career ==
Gil was born on 15 September 1953, in Valladolid, and is a 1976 graduate of the University of Valladolid. She completed a doctorate in mathematics at the University of Oviedo in 1979. Her doctoral dissertation, Incertidumbre y utilidad, was supervised by Pedro Gil.

She has continued at the University of Oviedo for the rest of her career, becoming full professor in 1992. Her initial research topics involved the applications of information theory to statistics, and have since gradually shifted to topics involving fuzzy data.

== Recognition ==
Gil received the Silver Medal of Asturias in 2014, and the SEIO Medal of the Spanish Statistics and Operations Research Society in 2021.

She was named a Fellow of the International Fuzzy Systems Association in 2015, elected to the Academia Asturiana de Ciencia e Ingeniería in 2021, and elected to the Spanish Royal Academy of Sciences in 2022.
