= Maglan =

Israeli commando and special forces unit

Unit 212
- Sayeret Maglan
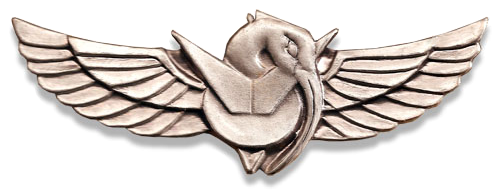
- Unit insignia
- Active: 1986–present
- Country: Israel
- Branch: Israeli Ground Forces
- Type: Sayeret
- Role: Special reconnaissance, anti tank warfare.
- Part of: 89th "Oz" Brigade; 98th Division
- Mottos: "In quietness and in confidence shall be your strength״ (Isaiah 30:15)

Commanders
- Notable commanders: Colonel Avi Blot

Maglan (Hebrew: מגלן, also known as Unit 212 or Sayeret Maglan) is a sayeret (reconnaissance) unit of the Israel Defense Forces, which specializes in operating behind enemy lines and deep in enemy territory using advanced technologies and weaponry. Maglan is part of the IDF's Commando Brigade, each commando unit goes through basic training with an infantry brigade, Maglan operators join the Paratroopers Brigade for basic training, and then go through an additional in-unit bootcamp and advanced training.

The unit's name means "Ibis" (In Hebrew: Maglan). According to one officer, "Maglan is a bird that knows how to adapt in every situation." A relatively new unit, Maglan was founded in 1986, but its existence was only declassified in 2006.

== History ==
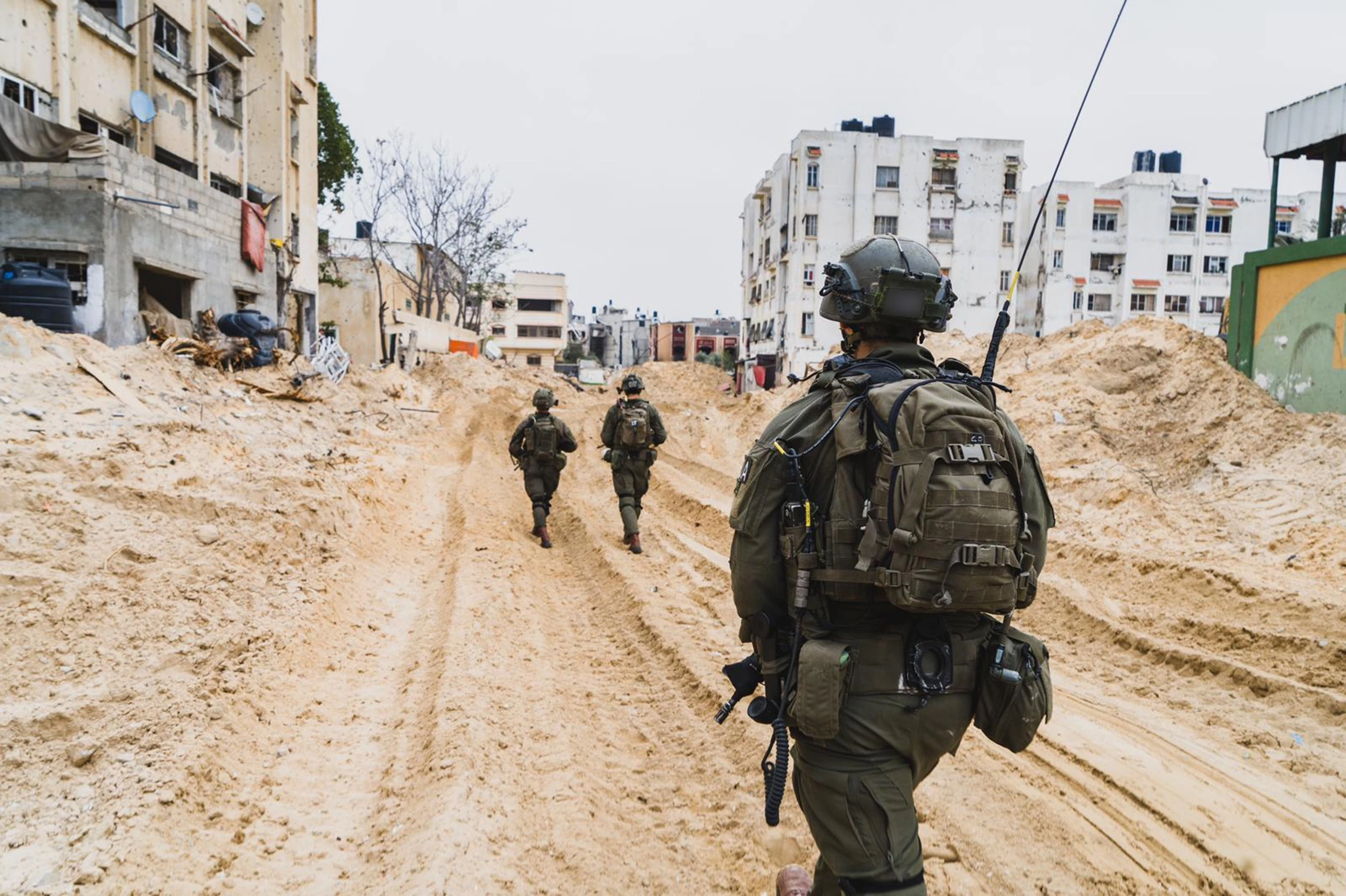
Maglan soldiers during the Gaza war

Very little is known about the unit, only that the force performs top secret operations behind enemy lines, deep within hostile territory. The IDF keeps Maglan's designated missions a secret and gives no information about it or the operations in which the unit takes part. The secretive unit has clocked-up countless hours of high-risk operations conducted well behind enemy lines—most of which have never been declassified.

Like Sayeret Matkal, although the operators in the unit wear a red beret, brown combat boots and conduct basic training at one of the paratroopers' bases, they are not part of the Paratroop Brigade.

Much like Sayeret Matkal, Maglan reports to the IDF's General Staff and not to one of its regional commands.

The unit was active in southern Lebanon during the South Lebanon conflict, and carried out numerous successful missions against Hezbollah. It took part in hundreds of missions in the West Bank and Gaza Strip during the Second Intifada, particularly in carrying out arrests of terror suspects. During the 2006 Lebanon War, the unit took part in many operations and achieved great success. On 19 July a force from the unit seized a fortified Hezbollah dugout adjacent to the Shaked post; two IDF soldiers and five Hezbollah operatives were killed in the battle. Operation Beach Boys, later on in the war, saw the unit embedded along the western coastal strip of Lebanon where they destroyed 150 Hezbollah targets, forty of which were rocket launchers. Maglan oversaw the destruction of command sites, trucks, caches of ammunition and infrastructure. Their activities reduced rocket fire on Israel's northern towns by about 40%.

During Operation Protective Edge, the unit took part in combat in the Gaza Strip. On 30 July 2014, three Maglan soldiers, St.-Sgt. Matan Gotlib (21), St.-Sgt. Omer Hay (21) and St.-Sgt. Guy Algranati (20) were killed and 15 others wounded by explosions in a booby-trapped tunnel shaft dug by Hamas. It was awarded a Chiefs of Staff Citation for its activities in Operation Protective Edge in 2015.

On July 12, 2018, Maglan snipers won the IDF International Sniping Competition, overcoming units such as Sayeret Matkal, the US Navy SEALs and US Army Sniper School.

On August 2, 2020 the unit ambushed and killed four militants in southern Golan Heights while the latter were deploying IEDs at the security fence.

During the October 7 attacks, the unit was involved in the Battle of Zikim, according to a video posted to social media by the IDF. The unit lost 14 soldiers in the first few days of the attacks, being among the first units to respond to Hamas attacks.

During the IDF's ground maneuver in the Gaza Strip during the "Iron Swords" War, the unit engaged in battles in the northern part of the Strip. The unit's fighters destroyed terrorist targets and eliminated terrorists using various means, including Gil missiles and "Steel Sting" mortars.

Maglan fighters, along with the Nahal and Givati task forces, operated to capture the Al-Shati camp in the western part of Gaza City. Brigade fighters operated in the northern part of the camp to locate Shati Battalion operatives and destroy its infrastructure. The brigade forces raided buildings deep within the camp and destroyed numerous enemy infrastructures. Additionally, they conducted a raid to clear the school area where anti-tank missile launch positions, a large quantity of weapons, and terrorist infrastructure were found. During the Maglan unit operations in the Al-Shati area, the fighters located and destroyed targets such as observation posts, terrorist infrastructures, most of which were within civilian areas, anti-tank missile launchers, and anti-tank squads. According to the IDF spokesperson, during the operation, the fighters eliminated many terrorists in encounters.

On December 3, the unit's forces began operating in the Khan Yunis area. During the fighting, the fighters located and destroyed additional terrorist infrastructures and eliminated many terrorists.

== Training ==
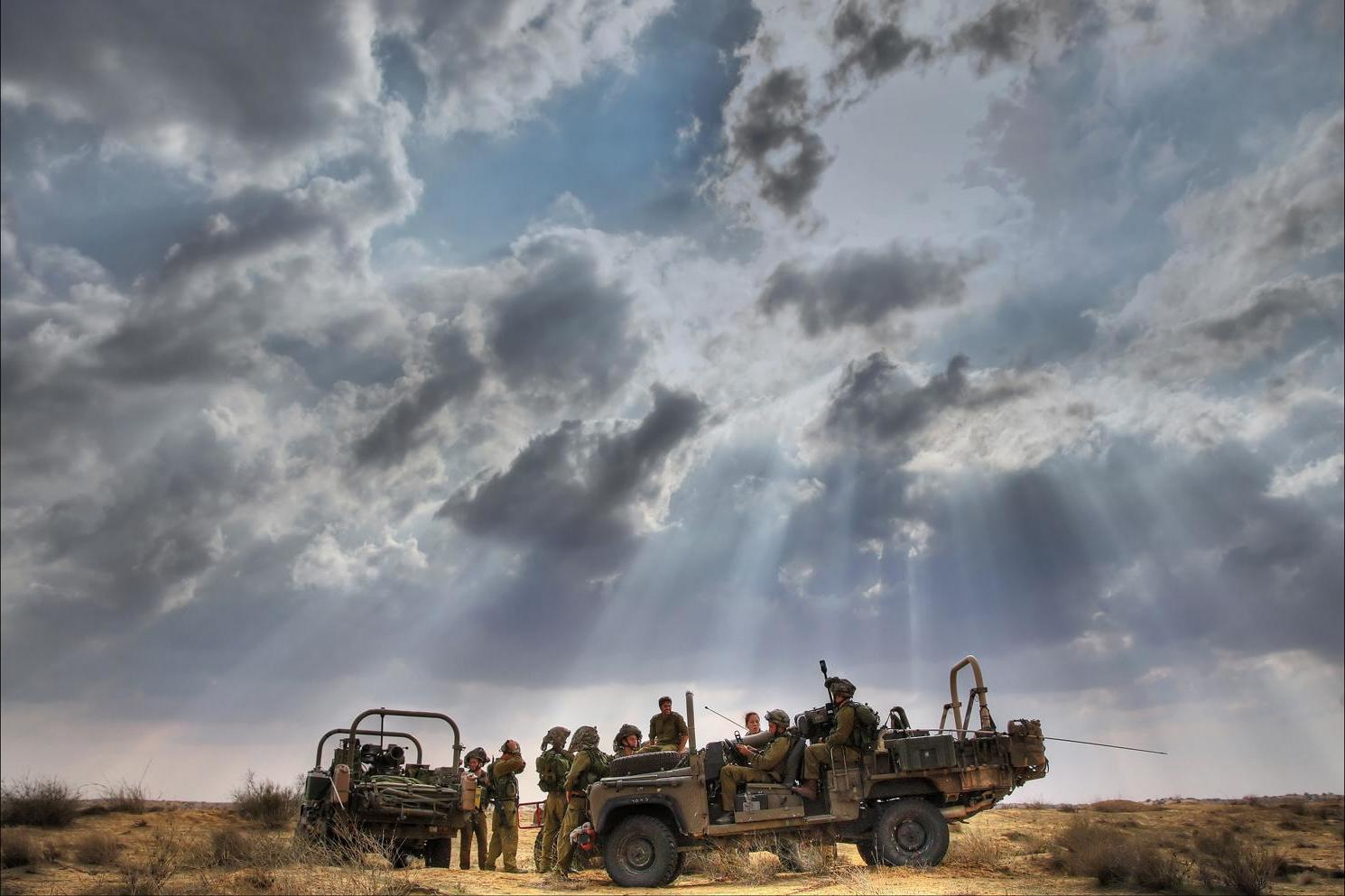
Maglan commandos training in the desert

Recruits train extensively for 18 months in what is considered to be one of the most challenging training courses in the IDF. The trainees first go through 6 months of basic and advanced infantry training within the Paratroopers Brigade, including a parachuting course. The soldiers then must complete a 60 km (37 mi) beret march (Hebrew: Masa Kumta) to Maglan's base to continue their training. The recruits go through courses in navigation, camouflage, observation, specialized warfare, and special operational devices. Physical standards are high, with candidates required to carry equipment weighing about 70% of their body mass over several dozen kilometers. About two-thirds of the candidates drop out due to the harsh nature of the program.

Each recruit also goes through the IDF's commander's course. Towards the end of training, the recruits learn specific skills according to the speciality of their unit. The end of training ceremony is held secretly and closed to the public.

== Notable members ==
- Naftali Bennett
- Yaniv Iczkovits
- Reshef Levi
- Mossi Raz
- Tal Russo
- Dror Weinberg

== See also ==
- Battle of Maroun al-Ras
