= Battle of Nablus =

2002 Israeli assault on the city of Nablus

Coordinates: 32°13′13″N 35°16′44″E

- Part of Operation Defensive Shield
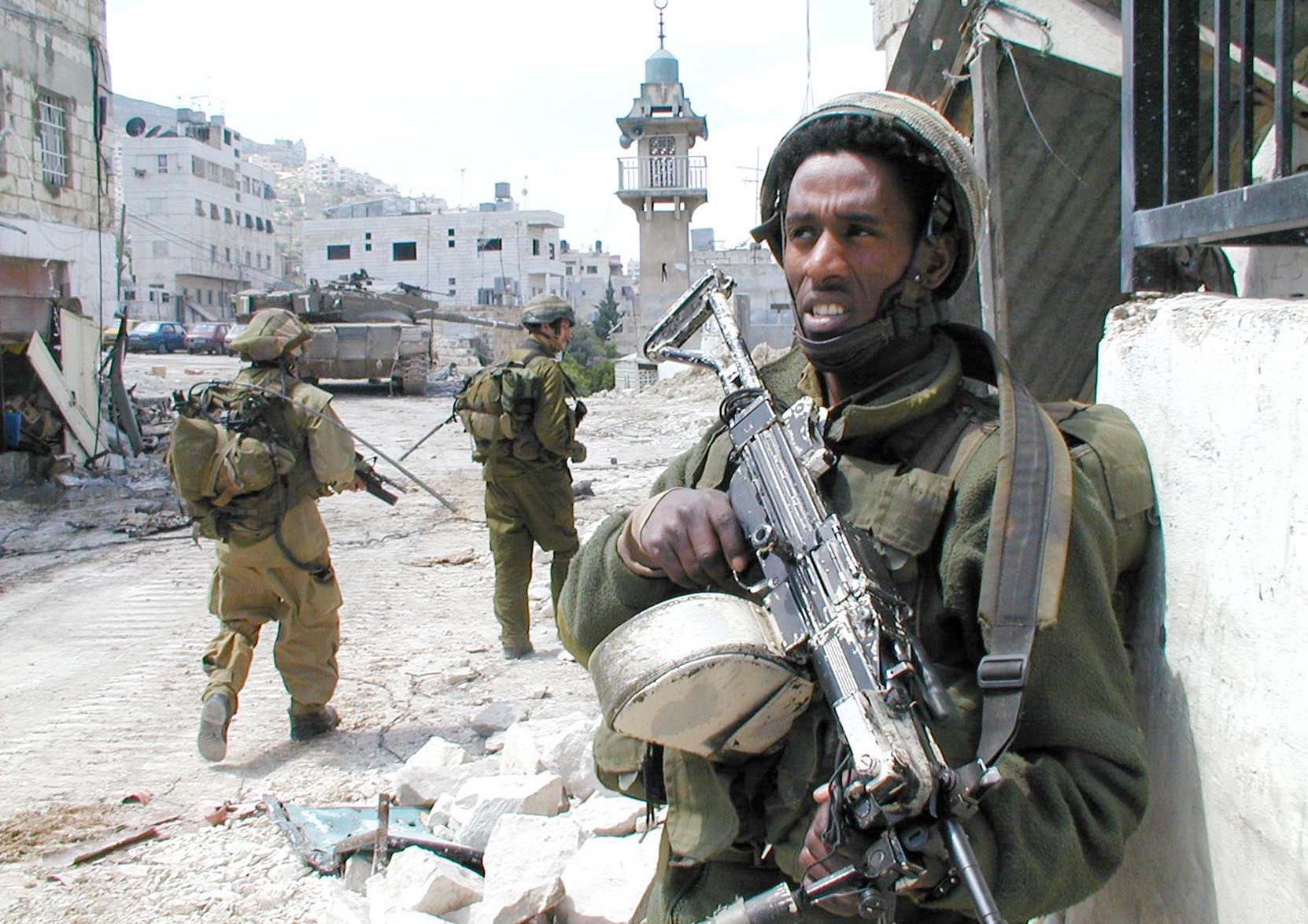
- Israeli soldiers patrolling in Nablus.
Date	April 3–8, 2002
Location	Nablus, Palestinian Authority (West Bank)
Result	Israeli victory

Belligerents
Israel; Israel Defense Forces	Palestinian Authority; Al-Aqsa Martyrs' Brigades; Tanzim; Hamas; Islamic Jihad

Commanders and leaders
Yitzhak Gershon; Aviv Kochavi; Shaul Mofaz; Moshe Tamir	Nasser Badawi; Nasser Awais; Ahmed Tabouk †; Husam Badran

Strength
2 regular infantry brigades 1 reserve armored brigade	1,000+

Casualties and losses
1 killed (friendly fire)	70 killed Hundreds captured
- 8 civilians killed

The Battle of Nablus was fought from April 5 to April 8, 2002, in the Palestinian city of Nablus in the West Bank between the Israel Defense Forces (IDF) and Palestinian forces, as part of Operation Defensive Shield in the Second Intifada. It resulted in an Israeli victory.

== Prelude ==
Of all the West Bank towns, the IDF General Staff was particularly concerned about the expected resistance in Nablus, and especially in its Casbah. Hamas and Fatah had launched dozens of suicide bombers. Despite a previous successful raid on Balata, the General Staff still estimated hundreds of armed men would be entrenched in the city, causing the IDF heavy casualties. Two days after the start of Defensive Shield, an extension of the operation north of Ramallah, to Nablus and Jenin, was approved. Originally, the mission was given to a reserve division, but was later transferred to the more experienced West Bank Division. The division's commander, Brigadier General Yitzhak Gershon, received two regular infantry brigades, the Paratroopers Brigade and the Golani Brigade, along with a reserve armored division. A private contractor allowed the commander of the Paratroopers 890th battalion to use a construction site for training for three days. There was a near-mutiny among one reserve armored platoon, who claimed they were not properly trained for urban warfare. High ranking armor officers eventually talked them into joining the operation.

== Battle ==
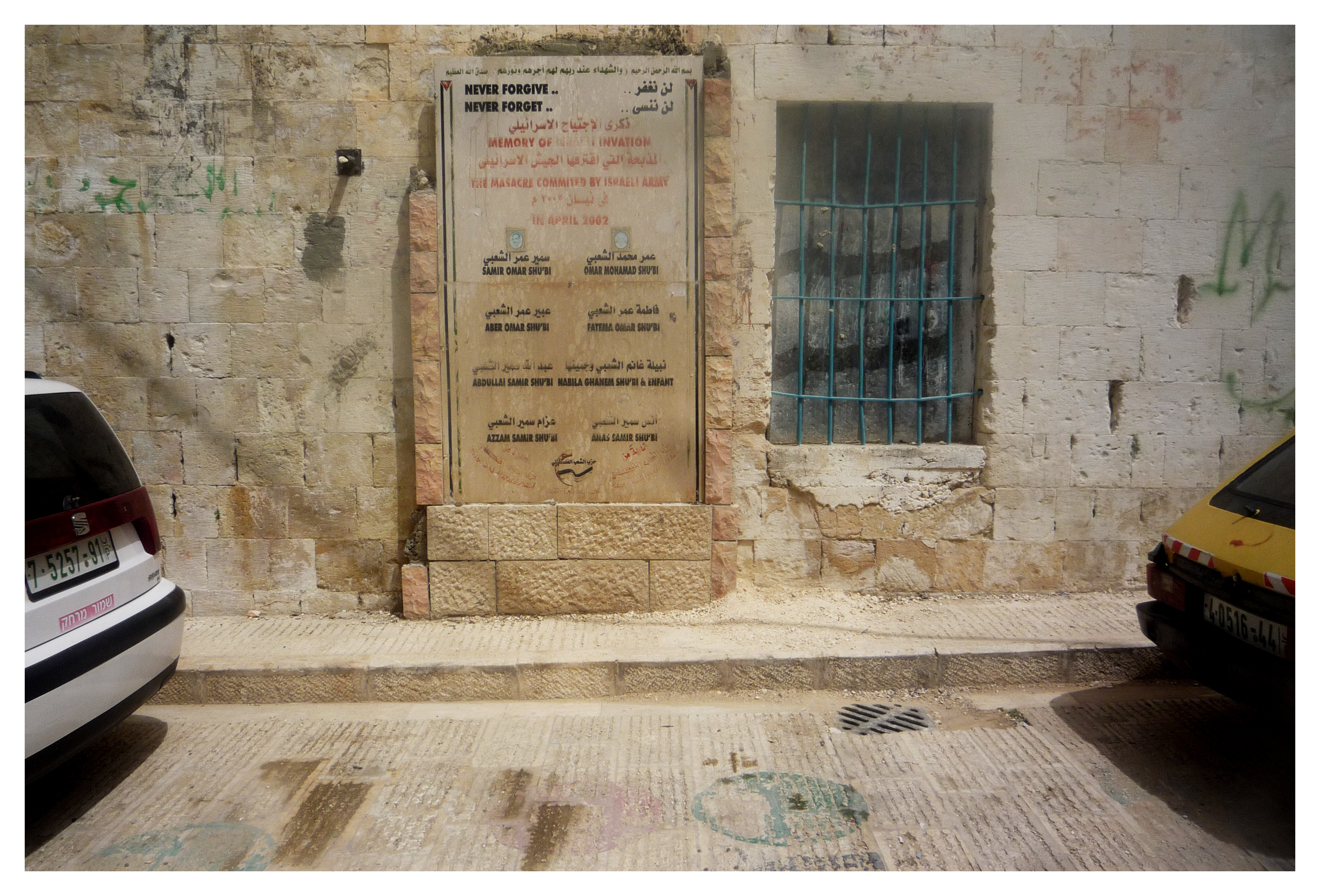
Memorial for the 9 members of the Shu'bi family who were killed by the Israeli army.

Israeli armored and infantry forces quickly occupied most of the city, with clashes taking place around refugee camps. Israeli Air Force attack helicopters fired rockets at Palestinian defenses in Nablus' main square and neighboring streets, but to minimal effect. The Nablus Casbah was attacked by two battalions simultaneously, using two different fighting methods. The Golani Brigade pushed in using Achzarit armored personnel carriers and armored bulldozers to clear away barricades. The Golani Brigade engaged the Palestinians in heavy street combat, forcing many to withdraw to the western part of the Casbah, where they were attacked by the Paratroopers Brigade. The Palestinians in the Casbah were deployed in small squads, consisting of two to four men, with each squad in charge of a sector. Explosive charges were set between the alleys and shooting positions were taken. Nasser Badawi, an Al-Aqsa Martyrs' Brigades commander, said "We are waiting for the Israelis to get out of their armored vehicles and fight us on the ground".

The Paratroopers advanced by sending several small forces at the same time to take over houses in the Casbah and confuse the Palestinian fighters. Often, the Palestinians would expose their positions to Israeli military snipers by firing at Israeli forces in another direction. Palestinian commander Ahmed Tabouk was among those killed by sniper fire. On April 8, the Palestinians announced their willingness to surrender. The acceptance of the surrender was postponed by two hours, during which the Paratroopers killed more Palestinian fighters.

According to a later lecture by the Paratroopers Brigade commander, Colonel Aviv Kochavi, Israeli Chief of Staff (Ramatkal) Shaul Mofaz, was unhappy with the fact that two other Palestinian towns, Qalqiliyah and Tulkarm, had surrendered almost without Palestinian casualties. Mofaz argued that it was better not to leave armed men in Nablus (per Oslo Accords), who would resume their attacks on the IDF after the withdrawal.

== Aftermath ==
About seventy Palestinian fighters and eight civilians were killed. At least one IDF officer was killed by friendly fire. Hundreds of Palestinians were arrested. High ranked wanted persons, such as Nasser Awais of Fatah and Husam Badran of Hamas fled east to Tubas. They were arrested a week later. The IDF also claimed to have exposed explosive labs. According to UNESCO, hundreds of buildings were affected. Sixty-four were severely damaged, seventeen of which had "particular heritage significance", including the Abd al-Hadi Palace. Four buildings were completely destroyed. The United Nations estimated the property damage at $110m.
