= Yehiel Gozal =

Israeli general and charity organizer (born 1957)

- יחיאל גוזל
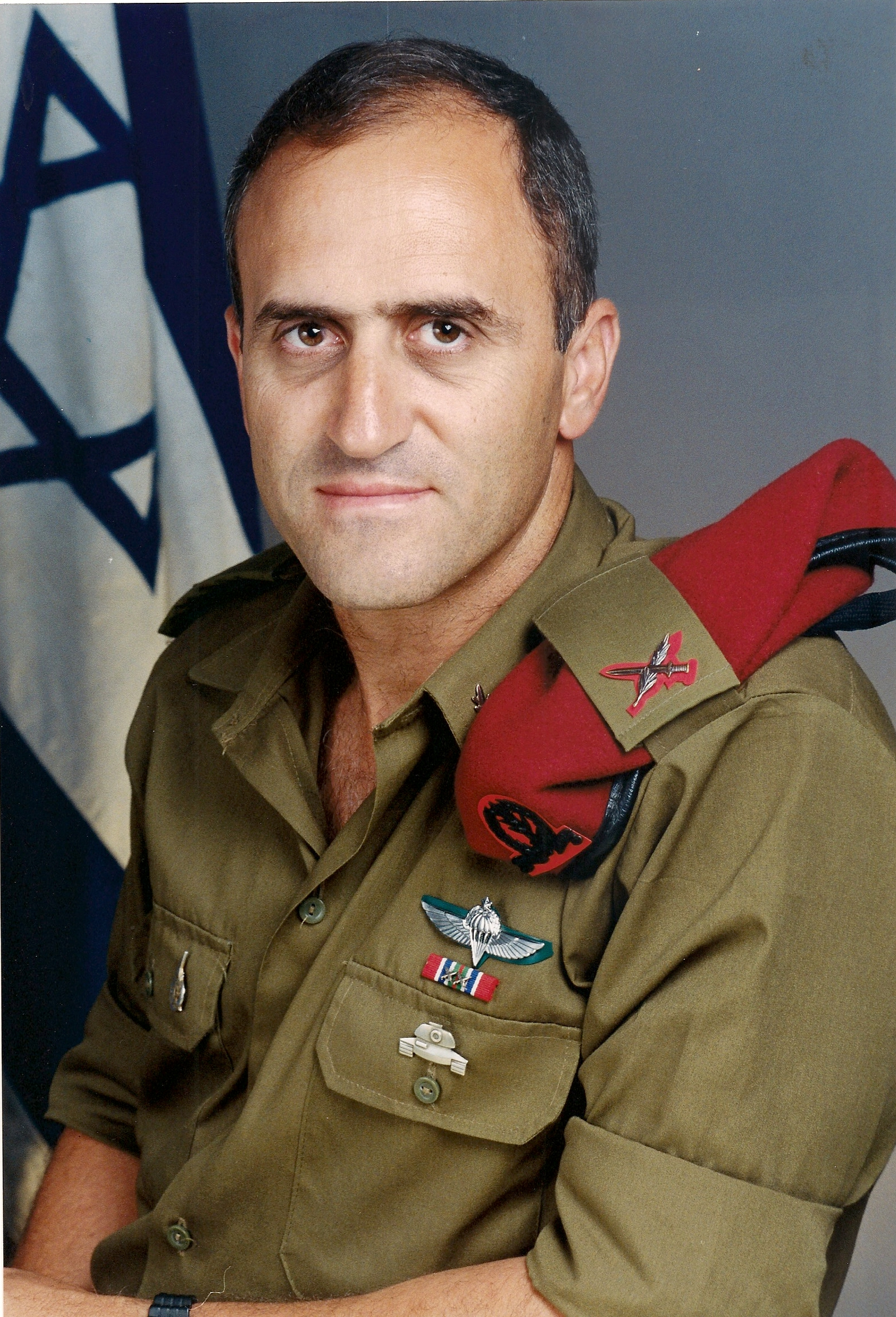
- Born: December 22, 1957 (age 68); Netanya, Israel
- Other name: Yehiel Gozal
- Military career
- Allegiance: Israel
- Service years: 1976–2003
- Rank: Brigadier General
- Nickname: Gozal
- Commands: Paratroopers Brigade; Military attaché; Southern Command (Israel); 500th Brigade
- Conflicts: South Lebanon conflict (1985–2000); First Intifada; Al-Aqsa Intifada
- Awards: Head of Regional Command (Aluf) Citation

Yehiel Gozal (Hebrew: יחיאל גוזל; born December 22, 1957), is a former Israeli brigadier general and the chairman of the Paratroops Heritage Association. Gozal served in various commanding positions in the Paratroopers Brigade and as commander of the 500th Armor Brigade, as chief of the Southern Command in the rank of Brigadier General, he also served as the IDF Defense Attaché in France and was national director CEO of the Friends of the Israel Defense Forces (FIDF) organization in the United States and Panama.

In November 2014, Gozal was appointed CEO of the Libi Fund and co-led to the consolidation of the Libi Fund and Awis – The Association for the Well being of Israeli Soldiers – into Yahad-United for Israel's Soldiers Fund (UFIS). Gen. Gozal end this position in May 2020.

In October 2020, Brigadier General Yehiel Gozal returned to the Friends of the IDF organization (FIDF) to manage the organization's branch in Israel, a position he held until the end of June 2024.

== Early life ==
Gozal was born in Tel-Aviv and grew up in Netanya. He was educated at the Tel Aviv pre-military academy in conjunction with the Herzliya Hebrew Gymnasium. His mother, Mazal (Fortune) Gozal, born in Alexandria, Egypt, immigrated to Israel in 1952 via France and engaged in handicraft, and his father, David Gozal, a native of Spanish Morocco, volunteered in 1947 for the Mahal (group of overseas volunteers who serve in the IDF) during the War of Independence, after which he immigrated to Israel and served as a qualified electrician.

== Military service ==
In 1976 he enlisted in the IDF, and after dropping out of The Israeli Air Force Flight Academy he volunteered for the Paratroopers Brigade and was assigned to the 890th Battalion. He underwent a training track as a fighter, a course of Infantry Squad Commander and a course of Infantry Officers. Upon the completion of the officers' course with honors, Gozal returned to the 890th Battalion as a platoon commander, and took part in Operation Menorah, where he fought against a fortified terrorist target which operated a mortar battery targeting Israel. He later served as a company commander in the 890th Battalion and participated in many operations, including Ish Damim Operation and Hamovil Operation. After that, he was released from the IDF and joined the Shin Bet (Israel Security Agency).

Following the wounding of the Paratroopers sabotage and engineering commander, Aharon Ziv, in Tsiltsal (Harpoon) Operation, he was called back to the IDF and served as the commander of the Paratroopers Sabotage and Engineering Company.

At the outbreak of the First Lebanon War, the Paratroopers Brigade, under the command of Yoram Yair, carried out an amphibious warfare landing on the Awali estuary and led the IDF divisions to the Beirut outskirts. The Paratroopers Brigade started the war as the head of the coastal force at the Awali where they landed with 24 rubber boats in the depth of Lebanon territory to enable the landing of the rest of the brigade's troops with the landing crafts. Later, the battalion fought as part of the "Anchor Force", the paratroopers' Patrol Battalion, which, for the first time, incorporated under its command the brigade units; the Reconnaissance Unit, the Palnat (Anti-Tank Company) the Palhan (Sabotage and Engineering Company) and a squadron of the medical company under the command of Doron Almog.

During the fighting Gozal cleared a minefield that blocked the brigade's path progress, for this he was later awarded the Head of the northern Command (Aluf) Citation. Later, during the war, he was wounded in the battle against Syrian commando fighters in the town of Cabrashmon, but continued fighting until the end (until ceasefire took place) and then was evacuated to Israel for treatment. A week later, Gozal returned to the unit and commanded it during the conquer of West Beirut.

At the end of his duty, He went to study at Bar Ilan University where he completed his B.A. studies between the years 1983–1985.

Subsequently, he was promoted to the rank of Lieutenant Colonel and was appointed battalion commander at the Officer Cadet School 1 (Ba"had 1). He was afterward appointed commander of the Paratroopers Brigade Training Base in 1986–1987. He was then assigned as the commander of the Parachuted Nachal Battalion (Battalion 50) between the years 1987 – 1989. After he completed his duty, he went on to pursue a master's degree in political science and national security. In 1990, he was promoted to Colonel and appointed Commander of the Ephraim Brigade, and served in the post until 1991. He was later assigned as the commander of Bar'am 300th Division where he served during the years 1991–1993. Afterward, he was appointed commander of the 130th Armor brigade and served in this post from 1993 to 1995. He later served as deputy commander of Division 162. After that, he was appointed Commander of the 500th Armor Brigade where he served from 1995 to 1997, and led the break into Nablus during the Western Wall Tunnel riots. In 1998, he was promoted to Brigadier General and became chief of the Southern Command. He was then delegated as the IDF defense and military attaché in France, Spain and Portugal.

In 2003, Gozal was discharged from his service in the IDF at the rank of Brigadier General.

== CEO of the Yahad-United for Israel's Soldiers Fund (UFIS) ==
Upon his release from the IDF, Gozal began to engage into social and voluntary activities. From 2003 to 2008 he served as the national CEO of the Friends of the Israel Defense Forces (FIDF) organization in the United States.

In November 2014, Brigadier General Yehiel Gozal was appointed CEO of the Libi Fund, and in July 2015, he was appointed CEO of the Yahad Fund, and led to the consolidation of Awis Fund and the Libi Fund

During his tenure, the Fund positioned the "fighter in the center" and initiated many diverse projects in favor of the fighters, among which the allocation of apartments to lone soldiers as part of a "Warm Home Project" (Ba'it Ham בית חם ) and a "From Uniforms to Studies" (Mimadim L'miluin ממדים ללימודים) – a Project that provides scholarships for discharged combat soldiers.

The organization, under the leadership of Gozal, is making every effort to reach each and every IDF fighter at their service endpoints and to assist them in their development and welfare.

== Chairman of the Paratroops Heritage Association ==
In 2011, he was appointed Chairman of the Paratroops Heritage. He is assuming his role as a full-fledged volunteer. The association handles the commemoration of paratroopers' brigade martyrs who have fallen in regular service and in the military reserves. The Association also engages in instilling Paratroopers heritage to soldiers in regular and standing military service, reservists, high school students and the general public.

The main mission of the organization under Gozal leadership was the establishment of the Paratroops Heritage Center in the area allocated to them at the Ammunition Hill (Giv'at Hatahmoshet) in Jerusalem.

== Personal life ==
Yehiel Gozal lives in Re'ut, he is married to Ayelet, a hydrotherapist and a teacher of special needs. The couple has 4 children who continue the legacy of their father
