= Padan =

Padan may refer to:

- Padan Fain, a recurring villain, one of the primary antagonists among The Wheel of Time characters
- Padan plain or Po Valley, a major geographical feature of Italy
- Padan-aram or Paddan Aram (Aramaic for Field of Aram), an early Aramean kingdom in Mesopotamia
- Nadav Padan, Head of the IDF C4I & Cyber Defense Directorate
