= Hannibal Directive =

Controversial Israeli military protocol

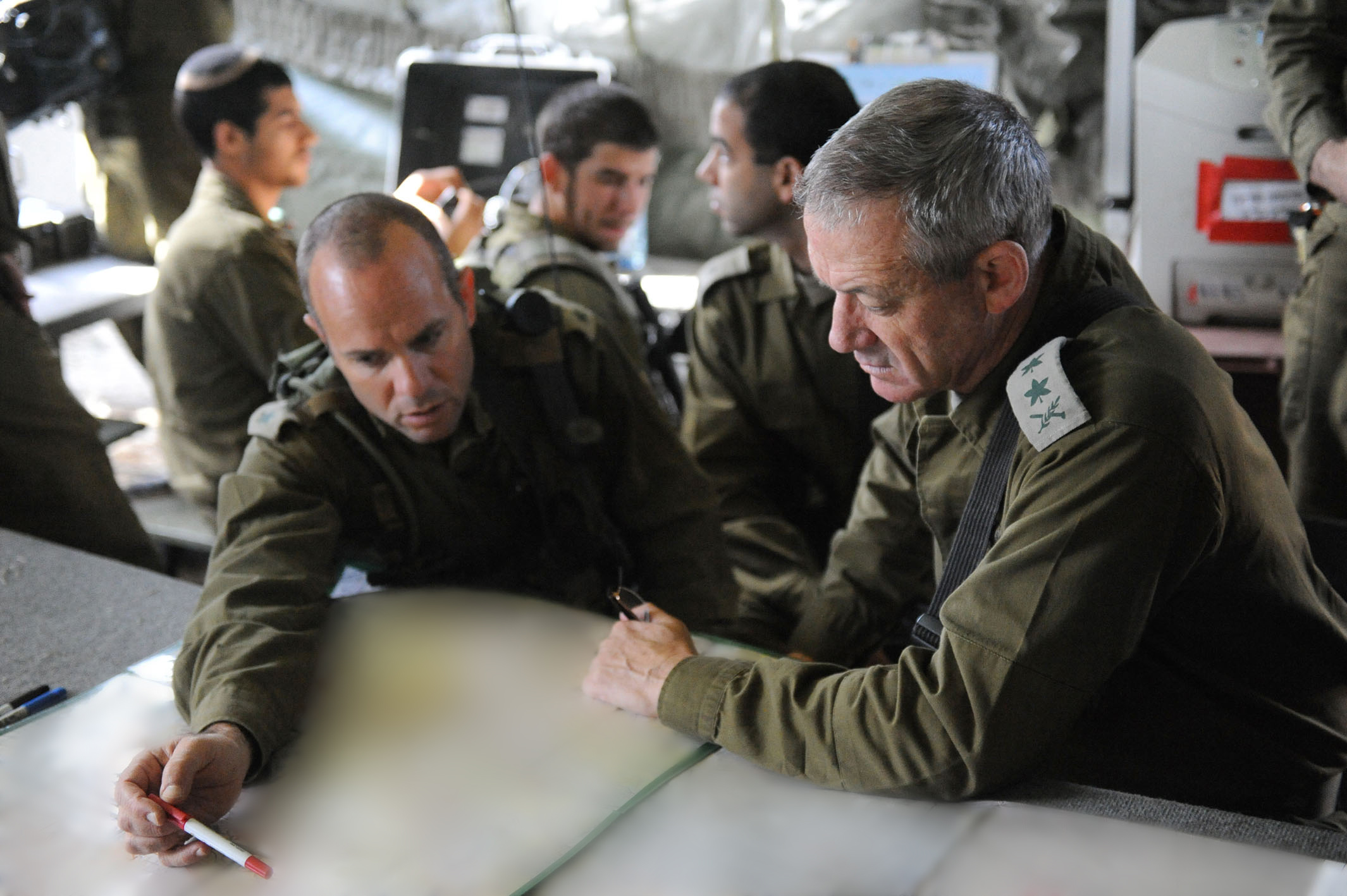
Then-IDF Chief of Staff Benny Gantz (right) in a training exercise where the forces practiced a soldier abduction scenario. Addressing the IDF's operations forum, Gantz stated that IDF protocols do not allow for a soldier to be killed in order to prevent his abduction.

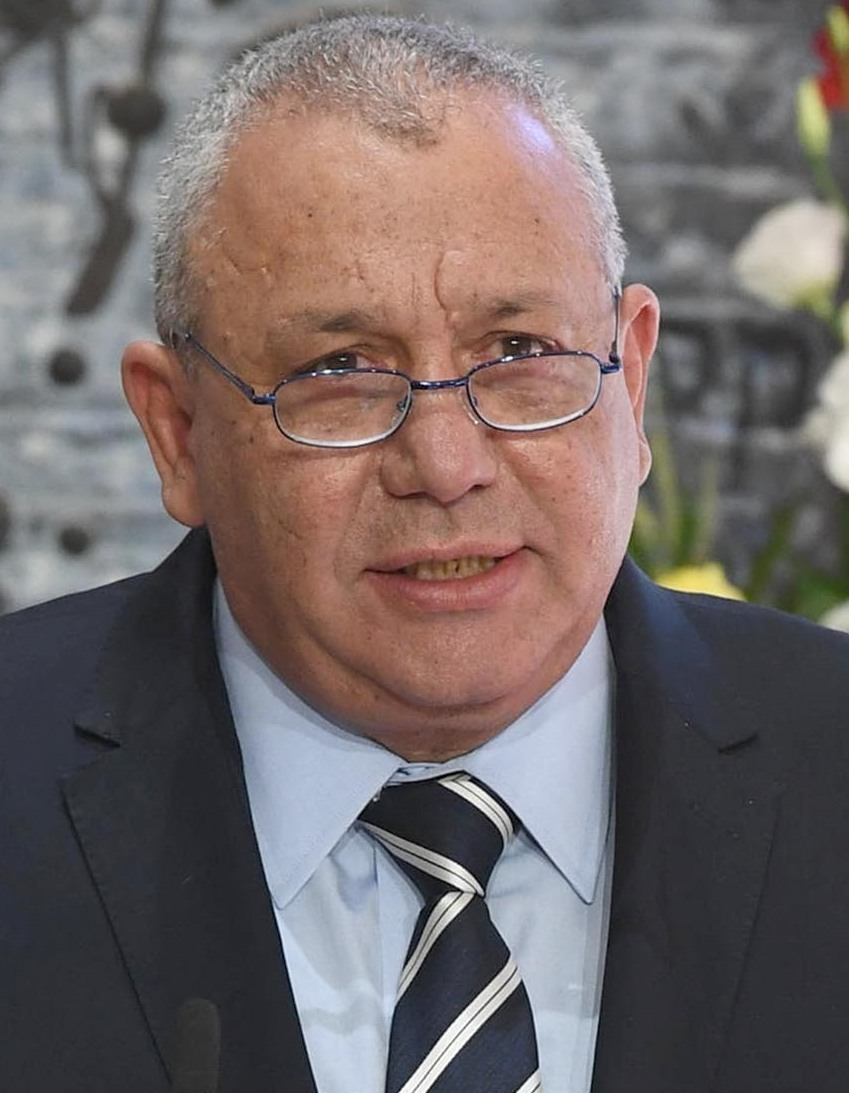
In 2016, then-IDF Chief of Staff Gadi Eisenkot announced that the Hannibal Directive had been revoked.

The Hannibal Directive (Hebrew: נוהל חניבעל, romanized: Nóhal Khanibaál), also translated as Hannibal Procedure or Hannibal Protocol, is the name of a controversial procedure used by the Israel Defense Forces (IDF) to prevent the capture of Israeli soldiers by enemy forces. Writer Eyal Weizman has stated that while the contents are still classified, "the following formulation, at the top of the directive, was made public: 'the kidnapping must be stopped by all means, even at the price of striking and harming our own forces.'" It was introduced in 1986, after a number of abductions of IDF soldiers in Lebanon and subsequent controversial prisoner exchanges. The full text of the directive was never published, and until 2003, Israeli military censorship forbade any discussion of the subject in the press. The directive has been changed several times, and in 2016, IDF Chief Of Staff Gadi Eisenkot ordered the formal revocation of the standing directive and the reformulation of the protocol.

Two versions of the Hannibal Directive may have existed simultaneously at times: a written version, accessible only to the upper echelon of the IDF, and an "oral law" version for division commanders and lower levels. In the latter version, "by all means" was often interpreted literally, as in "an IDF soldier was 'better dead than abducted'". In 2011, IDF Chief of Staff Benny Gantz stated the directive does not permit killing IDF soldiers to prevent abduction.

In the case of the abduction of Gilad Shalit, invocation of the Hannibal Directive occurred too late to have any influence on the course of events. Israeli newspapers including Haaretz, ABC News and the UN's Commission of Inquiry have reported that during the 7 October attacks the IDF ordered the Hannibal Directive to be used. The IDF was ordered to prevent "at all costs" the abduction of Israeli civilians or soldiers, possibly leading to the death of a number of Israeli civilians.

== Background ==
Israel has, with several notable exceptions, adhered to the principle of not negotiating with those it considers terrorists, especially in hostage situations. This policy led to some notable successes, such as Operation Entebbe, but also to loss of human life, e.g. the Maalot Massacre. In cases where Israeli soldiers were captured and no military solution was found, Israel was forced to negotiate with the captors for an exchange of prisoners. Parts of the Israeli public would not accept abandoning captured soldiers to their fate.

In 1970, a member of the Palestinian National Liberation Movement (Fatah) entered Israel from Lebanon and abducted a security guard in the northernmost Israeli town of Metula. He did this to secure a swap of the guard for a member of Fatah, jailed in Israel. In 1979, Israel agreed to exchange an Israeli POW held by Palestinians for 76 convicted Palestinian militants in Israeli jails.

During the 1982 Lebanon War, Palestinian forces imprisoned nine IDF soldiers as POWs. Six were held by Fatah (the main faction of the PLO) and three by the pro-Syrian PFLP-GC. In 1983, Israel agreed to free 4,700 Palestinian and Lebanese prisoners, including several high ranking PLO officers, for the six IDF soldiers held captive by Fatah. The following year Israel agreed to free another 1,150 Palestinian prisoners from Israeli jails. Many were allowed to remain in Israeli controlled territory.

== The Hannibal Directive ==
According to Haaretz reporter Leibovich-Dar, the motivation for the directive was the capture of two Israeli soldiers during a Hezbollah ambush in South Lebanon in June 1986. Both soldiers presumably died during the attack, and their bodies were returned to Israel in an exchange with Hezbollah in 1996. The directive developers were three top officers of the IDF Northern Command: Major General Yossi Peled, the command's operations officer; Colonel Gabi Ashkenazi; and the intelligence officer, Colonel Yaakov Amidror. The order was secret, and its existence was denied by Israeli military authorities.

The exact wording of the directive was not known, though Leibovich-Dar claimed that it had been updated several times over the years. Anshel Pfeffer, writing in The Jerusalem Post, described the order in 2006 as the "rumored" standard procedure in the eventuality of a kidnap attempt: "soldiers are told, though never officially" the content of this order.

Maariv quoted a version of the directive apparently applicable in 2014:

1. During a kidnapping, the main task becomes to rescue our soldiers from the abductors, even at the cost of harming or injuring our soldiers.
2. If the abductors and the kidnapped are identified and the calls are not heeded, a firearm must be fired in order to bring the kidnappers to the ground, or arrest them.
4. [sic] If the vehicle or the hijackers do not stop, they should be fired at individually, intentionally, in order to hit the hijackers, even if it means harming our soldiers.

This section was accompanied by an asterisk comment emphasizing: "In any case, everything should be done to stop the vehicle and not allow it to escape".

Apparently, the Hannibal Directive existed in several versions at that time. It had been amended by the IDF General Staff in October 2013, but neither the corresponding orders at the IDF Southern Command, nor the one at the Gaza Division had been similarly updated by July 2014. The three different, simultaneously current, versions of the directive could therefore be interpreted in different ways, especially on the sensitive question of the value of a soldier's life.

The origin of the name is uncertain. Israeli officials insisted that the directive's name was a random computer-generated designation; however, Hannibal, the Carthaginian general, is said to have preferred suicide by poison rather than being taken prisoner by his Roman enemies.

According to statements by several Israeli officials, the aim of the directive is to prevent the capture of an IDF soldier by enemy forces, even by risking the soldier's life or the lives of scores of non-Israeli civilians. Israeli spokespersons claim that IDF forces are forbidden to attempt to kill a captured soldier, rather than having him captured. Many testimonies from IDF soldiers and other sources contradict this claim and suggest that the IDF in practice adheres to the principle that a dead soldier is better than a captive soldier.

According to the directive, once it had been declared by a field officer, Israeli forces were to open fire on enemy forces carrying away an IDF prisoner. Vehicles suspected of removing such a prisoner from the battlefield could thus be attacked, even at the risk of harming, or even killing, the abductee himself. According to some interpretations, this includes even firing missiles from attack helicopters or firing tank shells at suspected escaping vehicles.

Amos Harel of Haaretz wrote in November 2011 that the Hannibal Directive was suspended for a time "due to opposition from the public and reservist soldiers" but was revised and reinstated by IDF Chief-of-Staff Benny Gantz after the abduction of Gilad Shalit in June 2006. The revised order stated that IDF commanders may take whatever action is necessary, even at the risk of endangering the life of an abducted soldier, to foil an abduction, but it does not allow them to kill an abducted Israeli soldier. The post-2006 version gave local field commanders the right to invoke Hannibal and take action, without waiting for superior officers' confirmation.

Former head of Israeli military intelligence (1974–1978) Shlomo Gazit criticised the fact that a low level officer ("a corporal") could invoke the Hannibal Directive, with such potentially far reaching consequences. The invocation of the Hannibal Directive in the 2006 Hezbollah cross-border raid had far-reaching consequences. An IDF tank sent in pursuit of the abductors was attacked, killing its crew. Attempts to rescue the bodies of the tank crew led to further IDF losses. By the time the Israeli government convened to decide how to respond to the attack, Israel – according to Gazit – "was already at war".

In June 2016 the IDF announced it was officially revoking the Hannibal directive.

According to The Times of Israel, the directive was replaced by three separate directives in January 2017. They were named "True Test", "Tourniquet" and "Guardian of life" and dealt with abductions in the West Bank and outside Israel in peace time and a general directive for war time. Very little is known about the content of these directives or the eventual differences between them. One general difference between the new and the previous Hannibal directive is that now it is clearly stated that, in case of an attempted abduction, soldiers should fire at the abductors "while avoiding hitting the captive".

A July 2024 Haaretz investigation revealed that the IDF ordered the Hannibal Directive to be used during the October 7 attacks.

In September 2024 ABC News in Australia reported on the use of the Hannibal Directive on October 7.

== Controversy within the IDF ==
Dr. Avner Shiftan, an army physician with the rank of major, came across the Hannibal directive while on reserve duty in South Lebanon in 1999. In army briefings he "became aware of a procedure ordering soldiers to kill any IDF soldier if he should be taken captive by Hezbollah. This procedure struck me as being illegal and not consistent with the moral code of the IDF. I understood that it was not a local procedure but originated in the General Staff, and had the feeling that a direct approach to the army authorities would be of no avail, but would end in a cover-up."

He contacted Asa Kasher, the Israeli philosopher noted for his authorship of Israel Defense Forces' Code of Conduct, who "found it difficult to believe that such an order exists" since this "is wrong ethically, legally and morally". He doubted that "there is anyone in the army" believing that 'better a dead soldier than an abducted soldier'. Haaretz article about Dr. Shiftan's experience was the first to be published in an Israeli newspaper.

In contrast to the view of Kasher, the IDF Chief of Staff Shaul Mofaz said in an interview with Israeli daily Yedioth Ahronoth in 1999: "In certain senses, with all the pain that saying this entails, an abducted soldier, in contrast to a soldier who has been killed, is a national problem." Asked whether he was referring to cases like Ron Arad (an Air Force navigator captured in 1986) and Nachshon Wachsman (an abducted soldier killed in 1994 in a failed rescue attempt), he replied "definitely, and not only".

According to Prof. Emanuel Gross, from the Faculty of Law at the University of Haifa, "Orders like that have to go through the filter of the Military Advocate General's Office, and if they were not involved that is very grave", he said. "The reason is that an order that knowingly permits the death of soldiers to be brought about, even if the intentions were different, carries a black flag and is a flagrantly illegal order that undermines the most central values of our social norms".

Harel writes that a kind of "Oral Law" has developed inside IDF, which is supported by many commanders, even at brigade and division level. It goes further than the official order, including the use of tank shells or air strikes. "A dangerous, unofficial interpretation of the protocol has been created", a senior officer told Haaretz. "Intentionally targeting a vehicle in order to kill the abductee is a completely illegal command. The army's senior command must make this clear to officers."

In anticipation of the Gaza War in 2009, Lt. Col. Shuki Ribak, the commander of the Golani Brigade's 51st battalion, instructed his soldiers to avoid kidnapping at any cost and even made clear that he expected his soldiers to commit suicide rather than being abducted:

[N]o soldier in Battalion 51 will be kidnapped at any price. At any price. Under any condition. Even if it means that he blows himself with his own grenade together with those trying to capture him. Also even if it means that now his unit has to fire a barrage at the car that they are trying to take him away in.

After a recording of Ribak's instructions was distributed by an anonymous source, the IDF reiterated its denial of having a policy of intentionally killing captured soldiers.

== Reported incidents (2000–2016) ==
=== 2000 Hezbollah cross-border raid ===
In October 2000, following the Hezbollah capture of three Israeli soldiers in the Shebaa Farms area, IDF Northern Command ordered a "Hannibal situation". Attack helicopters fired on 26 vehicles suspected of potentially transporting the abductees into Lebanon. The commanding officer who invoked the order said he believed the captured soldiers were already dead before the strikes were ordered.

=== 2006 Gaza cross-border raid ===
On 25 June 2006, Hamas captured Cpl. Gilad Shalit during a cross-border raid near the Kerem Shalom border crossing. An IDF commission of inquiry headed by Giora Eiland found that the Hannibal Directive was declared more than an hour after the capture, by which time Shalit and his captors were already well inside the Gaza Strip, leaving the order with little practical effect.

=== Ayta ash-Shaab (2006) ===
On 12 July 2006, two Israeli soldiers, Ehud Goldwasser and Eldad Regev, were captured by Hezbollah in an ambush, in which three other soldiers were killed. The Hannibal directive was invoked and a force consisting of tanks and armored personnel carriers was sent across the border to capture a Hezbollah post and block the exit routes out of the town of Ayta ash-Shaab. A Merkava II main battle tank ran over a powerful explosive charge and was totally destroyed and its four crew killed. The rescue mission was therefore aborted. An eighth IDF soldier was killed trying to retrieve the bodies of the tank crew. The Hannibal directive triggered instant aerial surveillance and airstrikes inside Lebanon to limit Hezbollah's ability to move the soldiers it had seized. "If we had found them, we would have hit them, even if it meant killing the soldiers," a senior Israeli official said. The bodies of the two soldiers were returned in an exchange with Hezbollah in July 2008.

=== Gaza (2008–09) ===
During the 2008–2009 Gaza war, an unidentified Israeli soldier was shot and injured by a Hamas fighter during a search of a house in one of the neighbourhoods of Gaza. The Hannibal Directive was declared. The wounded soldiers' comrades evacuated the house due to fears that it was booby-trapped. According to testimony by soldiers who took part in the incident, the house was then shelled to prevent the wounded soldier from being captured alive by Hamas. According to the IDF spokesman, however, the soldier was already dead, killed by terrorist gunfire.

=== Erez crossing (2009) ===
In 2009, Israeli civilian Yakir Ben-Melech was shot dead by Israeli security guards while trying to enter the Gaza Strip from Israel, by jumping the fence at the Erez crossing. He was a mental patient of Yehuda Abarbanel Mental Health Center, who, according to family members, wanted to contact Hamas, to secure the release of Israeli captive Gilad Shalit. According to Shlomo Saban, director of the Erez crossing, several warning shots were fired, after which the man was shot in the leg, an injury that caused extensive loss of blood and eventually led to his death.

Reportedly, the Hannibal Directive was declared when Ben-Melech tried to jump the fence and he was shot, not by IDF soldiers but by members of a private security firm, responsible for security at the Erez gate. Former Chief of Staff of the Southern Command, Brig.-Gen. Zvika Fogel said in an interview with Israeli radio: "We can't afford now any soul mate of Gilad Shalit".

=== Rafah (2014) ===
During the 2014 Gaza War, the third major offensive launched by Israel in Gaza since 2008, IDF Givati Brigade Lieutenant Hadar Goldin was captured by Hamas militants after a brief skirmish on August 1, despite the announcement of a 72-hour ceasefire agreement earlier that day. Forensic Architecture, investigating for Amnesty International in 2015, concluded that Israel then initiated the Hannibal Directive, ultimately resulting in carnage dubbed "Black Friday." The IDF carried out air and ground attacks on residential areas of Rafah during the Hannibal Directive attempt to prevent capture of Lt. Goldin. Amnesty and Forensic Architecture concluded that Israel's indiscriminate violence against all human life amounted to war crimes. Their report, along with the United Nations' investigation, the United Nations' Gaza Inquiry investigation alleged that war crimes were committed by both Israel and armed Palestinian groups, presumably Hamas. The massive Israeli bombardment killed between 135 and 200 Palestinian civilians, including 75 children, in the three hours following the suspected capture of the one Israeli soldier. Haaretz reported this to be the "most devastating" use of the Hannibal Directive to date.

In December 2014, audio recordings from the IDF's communication system were obtained by Ynet. This evidence, in addition to the July 2015 release of full transcripts from the IDF's communication system, reveal the initiation of the Hannibal Directive. However, an IDF investigation denied that the "Hannibal Procedure" was implemented, despite admitting to using the phrase on IDF field radios. The IDF investigation concluded that 41 people were killed, 12 of them Hamas combatants. Asa Kasher, a winner of the Israel Prize and the author of the IDF's ethical code, disagreed with the IDF's report while speaking at a conference of the Tzohar Zionist rabbinical organization. Kasher stated that a soldier had been killed during the summer of 2014 by his comrades due to a mistaken understanding of the directive; Kasher intimated that the soldier was Lt. Goldin.

Testimonies from IDF soldiers involved in the attack provided further evidence contrary to the official IDF story. An Israeli army infantry officer described the events of August 1 to Israeli NGO Breaking the Silence as follows:

The minute 'Hannibal Directive' is declared on the radio, there are consequences. There's a fire procedure called the 'Hannibal fire procedure' – you fire at every suspicious place that merges with a central route. You don't spare any means.

He reported that the initial fire lasted three hours. An artillery soldier said his battery was "firing at a maximum fire rate" into inhabited areas. According to the Givati Brigade inquiry, more than 2,000 bombs, missiles and shells were fired in Rafah on 1 August 2014, including 1,000 in the three hours following the capture.

A second case occurred in a clash between an IDF unit and Hamas forces on July 25, 2014. After St.-Sgt. Guy Levy went missing, the Hannibal procedure was reportedly enacted. It is unknown whether Levy was captured dead or alive, and killed later by IDF fire. According to the IDF, Levy was killed by a Hamas anti-tank missile and his body seized by Hamas.

=== Shuja'iyya (2014) ===
During the Battle of Shuja'iyya, on July 20, 2014, Hamas fired an anti-tank missile at an IDF armored personnel carrier carrying seven soldiers, including St.-Sgt. Oron Shaul.

Hamas claimed to have captured an IDF soldier named "Aron Shaul", corroborating its claim with the soldier's "photo ID and credentials". The IDF later stated that the body of Oron Shaul had not been identified among the dead found inside the vehicle. It is unclear if Shaul was captured alive or dead or whether the Hannibal Directive was invoked or not.

=== Qalandia Camp (2016) ===
Two members of the Oketz Unit (Special Forces) soldiers entered Qalandiya Refugee Camp by mistake and were confronted by a Palestinian crowd, which began throwing stones and molotov cocktails. The burning jeep was abandoned and the two soldiers got separated in the alleys of the camp. One of them retained his mobile phone, contacted IDF command and was picked up by IDF forces. The second soldier hid in a yard, waiting to be rescued. Meanwhile "Hannibal" was declared and the camp was surrounded by large numbers of IDF forces. After less than an hour the second soldier was found unharmed. So, none of the IDF soldiers were ever captured by Palestinians. One Palestinian was killed in the clashes, while 10 Palestinians and five Israeli soldiers were wounded.

The incident was described in 2017 as the last time the Hannibal Directive was officially declared.

== Alleged use during 7 October attacks ==
Some commentators have argued that the Hannibal Directive, previously understood to generally apply to situations involving IDF soldiers, enemy combatants and possibly non-Israeli civilians (with the goal of avoiding a repetition of the Ahmad Jibril, Samir Kuntar and Gilad Shalit prisoner exchanges thought as unfavorable for Israel), but not to Israeli civilians, was implemented by the IDF on a mass scale on 7 October 2023 when the IDF fired on Israeli civilian hostages while they were being driven by Hamas militants into Gaza. With some previous exceptions, this would be the first time in the history of the Israeli–Palestinian conflict that a Palestinian kidnapping operation and subsequent IDF Hannibal reaction included Israeli civilians. An investigation by Haaretz in July 2024 concluded that the directive had been used on several occasions on that day, starting with a 7:18 a.m. order for the situation at Erez border crossing.

=== Initial claims ===
In a November 2023 interview with Haaretz's weekly Hebrew podcast, Lieut. Col. Nof Erez explained that the IDF was more or less wiped out on the ground on the Gaza border. There was no one that helicopter or drone pilots could communicate with. This made the identification of persons on the ground very difficult. According to Erez, "the Hannibal [Protocol], for which we have been conducting drills over the past 20 years, relates to the case a single vehicle containing hostages: you know which part of the fence it comes through, what side of the road it would move to and even which road... What we saw here was a 'mass Hannibal'. There were many openings in the fence. Thousands of people in many different vehicles, both with hostages and without hostages".

According to Kibbutz Be'eri survivors Hadas Dagan and Yasmin Porat, an Israeli tank fired two shells at a house that was known to hold over a dozen hostages, including 12-year-old twins; only two hostages survived. In January 2024, a Haaretz editorial asked the IDF to disclose whether the Hannibal Directive was used during the Be'eri massacre.

=== IDF statements ===
On 18 December the IDF confirmed that Israeli combatants “fell as a result of friendly fire on October 7," but added that "beyond the operational investigations of the events, it would not be morally sound to investigate these incidents due to the immense and complex quantity of them that took place in the kibbutzim and southern Israeli communities due to the challenging situations the soldiers were in at the time.".

=== Yedioth Ahronoth investigation ===
In January 2024, an investigation by Israeli newspaper Yedioth Ahronoth concluded that the IDF had in practice applied the Hannibal Directive from noon of October 7, ordering all combat units to stop "at all costs" any attempt by Hamas militants to return to Gaza with hostages. According to Yedioth Ahronoth, Israeli soldiers inspected around 70 vehicles on the roads leading to Gaza that had been hit by a helicopter, tank or UAV, killing all occupants in at least some cases.

==== Further accusations and interviews ====
In January 2024, Noam Dan, cousin of hostage Ofer Calderon, accused the Israeli government of applying the Hannibal Directive to civilian captives in Gaza. Dan argued that the administration's reliance on "military pressure" over diplomatic negotiations effectively sacrificed the hostages to prolong its political tenure, stating, "My government, my Prime Minister, and the Minister of Defense are applying the 'Hannibal doctrine' to my family and all the citizens who were kidnapped from their homes. We are killing our own people."

On 19 March 2024, IDF Captain Bar Zonschein stated in a televised interview screened by Yedioth Ahronoth and Channel 13 that he had ordered tank shells to be fired at two pickup trucks heading toward the Gaza Strip from the Kissufim area on October 7. Zonschein noted that he observed a "pile of people" in the vehicles but could not distinguish if they were dead or living Israeli soldiers. He said “My gut feeling told me that they [soldiers from another tank] could be on them." Zonshein is asked by the interviewer: "So you might be killing them with that action? They are your soldiers." "Right," he replied, "but I decided that this is the right decision, that it's better to stop the kidnapping, that they won't be taken." When asked if this constituted the Hannibal Directive, Zonschein stated that the order dictates firing at blocking points and that "in the event of detection, you need to do that as well." He later noted he believed none of his soldiers were ultimately harmed by the shell fire.

=== UN Commission report ===
A report by a UN Commission published in June 2024 found that the Israel Security Forces used the Hannibal Directive in several instances on October 7. In one example, a tank crew confirmed that they had applied the Hannibal Directive when they shot at a vehicle suspected of carrying kidnapped Israeli soldiers. The report also said that in two instances, Israeli forces "had likely applied the Hannibal Directive," resulting in the killing of at least 14 Israeli civilians.

=== Haaretz investigation ===
A July 2024 Haaretz investigation revealed that the IDF ordered the Hannibal Directive to be used, adding: "Haaretz does not know whether or how many civilians and soldiers were hit due to these procedures, but the cumulative data indicates that many of the kidnapped people were at risk, exposed to Israeli gunfire, even if they were not the target." One of these decisions was made at 7:18 A.M., when an observation post reported someone had been kidnapped at the Erez crossing, close to the IDF's liaison office. "Hannibal at Erez" came the command from divisional headquarters, "dispatch a Zik." The Zik is an unmanned assault drone, and the meaning of this command was clear, Haaretz reported.

A source in the Southern Command of the IDF told Haaretz: "Everyone knew by then that such vehicles could be carrying kidnapped civilians or soldiers...There was no case in which a vehicle carrying kidnapped people was knowingly attacked, but you couldn't really know if there were any such people in a vehicle. I can't say there was a clear instruction, but everyone knew what it meant to not let any vehicles return to Gaza." The same source stated that on 2:00 P.M. a new instruction was given that "was meant to turn the area around the border fence into a killing zone, closing it off toward the west."

Haaretz further reported that at 6:40 P.M. military intelligence believed militants were intending to flee back to Gaza in an organized manner from near Kibbutz Be'eri, Kfar Azza and Kissufim. In response the army launched artillery at the border fence area, very close to some of these communities. Shells were fired at the Erez border crossing shortly thereafter. The IDF says it is not aware of any civilians being hurt in these bombardments.

Haaretz noted one case in which it is known that civilians were hit, which took place in the house of Pessi Cohen at Kibbutz Be'eri. 14 hostages were in the house as the IDF attacked it, with 13 of them killed.

=== IDF probe, July 2024 ===
An IDF operational review released later in July 2024 into the incident at Kibbutz Be'eri cleared its combatants of wrongdoing It did not definitively establish a cause of death for the 13 hostages who died in Pessi Cohen’s house, but reported that it found that most were likely murdered by the militants.

The probe left many in Be'eri unsatisfied. Pessi Cohen's daughter-in-law Sharon Cohen told Israeli radio she did not accept the investigation's conclusions: "That's not really true [that hostages were not harmed by tank shells]," she told Israel's Radio Bet on July 14. "Out of personal privacy issues, I can't really get into the details. These are details that we were told would be investigated again. In addition, I'll say that because the incidents in the kibbutz were so exceptional and strange and difficult, the whole issue of removing the bodies, and autopsies, and all those things — essentially were not done."

==== ABC News (Australia) report ====
A September 2024 report by ABC News (Australia) covers the use of the Hannibal Directive. It described two incidents Israeli civilians survived Israeli forces firing on them and killing other hostages. A survivor of Kibbutz Nir Oz described being fired upon by the Israeli military as Hamas members tried to take her and other hostages across the border: "[An] IDF helicopter appeared above us. At some point the helicopter shot at the terrorists, the driver and the others. There was screaming in the wagon." Ms Dekel-Chen said one woman, her friend Efrat Katz, was shot and killed. Six months later an Israeli Air Force investigation acknowledged it was likely an attack helicopter had killed Katz.

ABC News interviewed a Kibbutz Be'eri resident who survived the day but lost two relatives at the Pessi Cohen residence. He believed they were killed by militants and that tank fire on the house did not intend to kill civilians but was always likely to. ABC News notes that "The IDF review also contradicts testimony from one of the two survivors of Pessi's house, Yasmin Porat, who told Israel's Kan radio on October 15 that Hamas gunmen had not threatened the hostages and instead intended to negotiate with police for their safe return to Gaza. She said an Israeli police special unit had started the gun battle by firing upon the house, catching 'five or six' kibbutz residents outside in 'very, very heavy crossfire'. In the interview, she was asked: 'So our forces may have shot them?' 'Undoubtedly,' she replied."

=== Comments by former Israeli defense minister ===
In February 2025, in an interview with Channel 12 given after he was dismissed as Israeli defense minister, Yoav Gallant was asked if the Hannibal Directive had been used by the IDF during the Gaza war. He replied: “I think that, tactically, in some places, it was given, and in other places, it was not given, and that is a problem.”

=== IDF probe, February 2025 ===
A military inquiry into the events of October 7, published in February 2025, found that around 10:30 A.M. the Israeli air force issued the Hannibal Directive to fire on anything moving around the Israel-Gaza border, although some pilots were hesitant about this - and in some cases held off - for fear of accidentally hitting hostages.

== Military evaluation by opponents ==
In October 2019 the head of the Islamic Revolutionary Guard Corps (IRGC) Quds Force, Major-General Qasem Soleimani, gave an interview to Iranian state television on the 2006 Lebanon War. In it he stressed that the use of the Hannibal Directive by the IDF made organizations like Hamas and Hezbollah upgrade their operational planning and make their hostage-taking operations more meticulous, in order to avoid getting their hostages killed by Israeli fire. Describing the 2006 Hezbollah cross-border raid, Soleimani said:

The [Hezbollah] fighters had to cross the border, reach the long-watched Israeli outpost, and take the prisoners. Thus, each operation had to be done so carefully that the Israeli soldiers inside the tanks were not killed. [...] The operation had to be carried out very quickly: not in 15 or 30 minutes, but in a very few minutes or even seconds. They had to move the captured Israeli soldiers very quickly to a safe place before the enemy could reach them (and this is always very dangerous, because the enemy in such cases uses the so-called Hannibal Protocol, i.e. opens fire on its own captured soldiers and Resistance fighters, because he prefers to have dead Israeli soldiers than prisoners that he will later be forced to exchange for imprisoned Resistance fighters). Usually, the enemy is within a few minutes of the point of operation – I mean the ground force, since for the air force it could of course take much less time and the enemy would arrive very quickly. So it had to be designed very precisely.
