= FIDF =

FIDF may refer to:

- Falkland Islands Defence Force, the local volunteer defence unit in the Falkland Islands
- Friends of the Israel Defense Forces, an American charity
