= Yoram Yair =

Israeli military officer (born 1944)

Major General (Res.) Yoram Shmuel Yair
- יורם יאיר
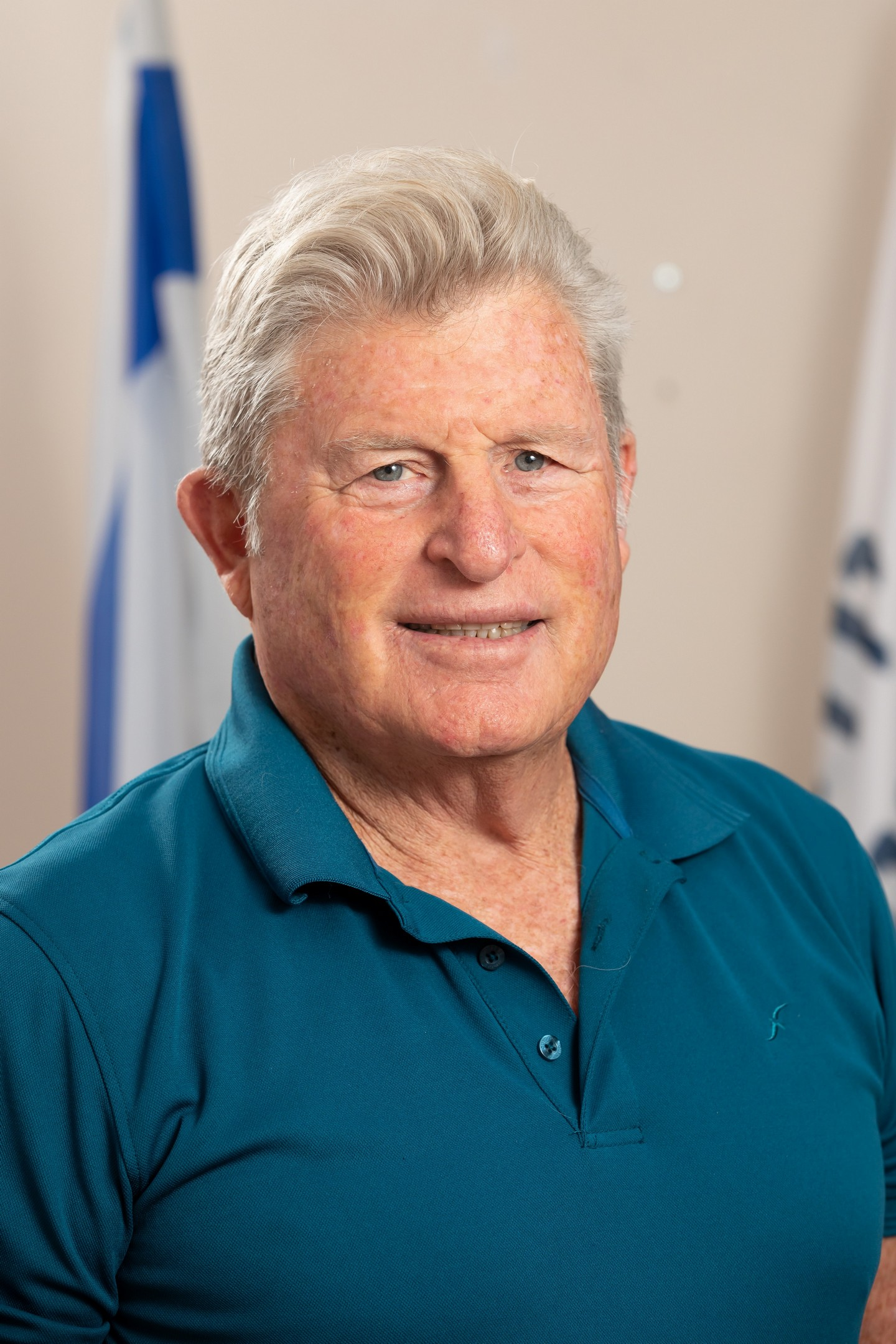
- A picture of Yoram Shmuel Yair
- Born: 29 August 1944 (age 82); Ein HaNatziv, Israel
- Military career
- Allegiance: Israel Defense Forces
- Service years: 1963–98
- Rank: Major general
- Nickname: Ya-Ya
- Unit: Paratroopers Brigade
- Commands: 50 paratroop battalion, reserve paratrooper brigade, the IDF's Officer Candidate School (Bahad 1), the 35th Paratroopers Brigade, 91st Division, Manpower Directorate, Israel's military attaché in the United States
- Conflicts: Six-Day War; War of Attrition; Yom Kippur War; Operation Litani; 1982 Lebanon War; South Lebanon conflict First Intifada
- Other work: Chairman at Yahad – United for Israel's Soldiers

Yoram Shmuel Yair (Hebrew: יורם שמואל יאיר; born 29 August 1944) is an Israeli retired soldier who served in the IDF for 35 years until his release with the rank of major general, in 1998. After his release, he volunteers in the social, educational and business fields. He serves as chairman and strategic advisor of several companies in Israel and abroad, and as chairman of "Yahad – United for Israel's Soldiers", chairman of the association "After Me!" and chairman of an association that operates drug and alcohol rehab villages. Yair built and heads the Rabin Leadership Program at the IDC Herzliya.

== Military service ==
Yair was born in Kibbutz Ein Hanatziv, grew up in Tel Aviv and attended Ironi D. High School in the city, was a member of HaNoar HaOved VeHaLomed youth movement. He enlisted in the IDF in August 1963 as part of the Nahal Gar'in (Core Group). At the end of his basic training, he was sent to his displeasure for a Squadron Commanders Course in Shivta, which he completed as an outstanding Company trainee and even remained as an instructor. At the end of the Officers Academy which he then proceeded to, he returned to serve as a platoon commander at the Squadron Commanders Course and when asked to sign for permanent service, he asked for and even conditioned it on moving to the Paratroopers' Brigade. His request was accepted and he served as a platoon commander and deputy company commander in the Parachuted Nahal Battalion, the 50th Battalion and eight months later was appointed company commander.

In the Six Day War, Yair was the Hod (Spearhead) company commander who were first to break into the Rafah tensions, at the head of the 50th Battalion which led the Paratroopers' Brigade, under the command of Raful. Yair fought at the head of his company and managed with his one half-track with ten soldiers on, to break through about a mile and a half into the heart of the compound, fighting hundreds of enemy soldiers. Their progress was halted when the half-track was hit and exploded and three of the ten soldiers killed and the rest wounded; Yair was severely wounded but fought along his soldiers in the Egyptian soldiers attacking them. His rescue from the battlefield took place many hours later.

In 1968 he began his academic studies and chose the psychology track. In 1971, he completed his undergraduate studies and began his master's degree studies. In the same year, he returned to active service and was an instructor in the IDF Officer Candidate School. In this role, he identified the main issue of the Officers Academy and which was a dropout rate of over 50% of the cadets in the school and chose to serve as the Officers Academy psychologist. As the school's psychologist, he invented and developed the system for the sorting and formation of the cadets at the entrance to the academy. At a later stage, his method was transferred to the Paratroopers Brigade and the various patrols. Since then, Yair's system has been used as the IDF's sorting system for admission to elite units.

In 1972 Yair returned to the Paratroopers' Brigade and was appointed Deputy Commander of the Parachuted Nahal Battalion until August 1973 when he left for the Inter-Armed College of Command and Staff.

In October 1973, with the outbreak of the Yom Kippur War, Yair was a Major ranked student at The Inter-Armed College of Command and Staff. On the morning of Yom Kippur, he was asked by the commander of the Paratroopers Brigade to go back to the 50th Battalion, whose soldiers were manning the border outposts, in the southern half of the Golan Heights. Yair was sent to serve as a Deputy Commander of the 50th Battalion. The battalion commander was wounded in a parachute training two weeks earlier, and Menachem Zatursky the Deputy Commander took his place. Yair arrived at the battalion headquarters at El Al, under the heavy Syrian shelling that opened the war. There it became clear to him that the connection with Zatursky and the operations officer who had both gone out into the field had been lost. Yair took command of the battalion. The battalion took part in the difficult containment battle against the Syrian offensive in the southern Golan Heights.

Already on the evening of Yom Kippur, the southern sector was left without tanks in the face of the Syrian division's attack. At dawn the next day – Sunday, after the Syrians occupied Tel Saki and Ramat Magshimim and reached a range of 3 kilometres (1.9 mi) from the battalion's headquarters, Yair was ordered to retreat with all the fighters at headquarters to the Sea of Galilee. Yair, orders his soldiers to retreat towards Ein Gev, while he decides to be left alone, at his observation post, located near the front line, watching the Syrian division preparing to resume its attack south-ways. Yair kept in touch with his fighters trapped in outposts inside the territory occupied by the Syrians. When the first reserve tanks arrived in the sector, Yair positioned them to stop the Syrian attack, which reached up to 700 meters from its position and was stopped. The next day, Yair led the second rescue attempt of the Tel Saki and post 116 fighters, and managed to reach the besieged and wounded and rescue them. Yair was able to recover the battalion that was badly damaged, with the help of his demand from the IDF High Command to allow the battalion to return and participate in the fighting.

Yair crossed the Suez Canal and led at the head of his battalion the advance of the three armoured brigades of the Baran Division, against the Egyptian commando and outposts in the agricultural buffer zone along the freshwater canal and lakes. The battalion fought for more than a hundred miles, as far as the outskirts of the city of Suez. Yair was careful to make use of the battalion's advantages and conducted all the fighting in the Egyptian complexes along the tens of kilometres in infantry fighting, which surprised the Egyptians who waited for Israeli tanks with anti-tank missiles. In all the long days of fighting on the other side of the Suez Canal not one of the battalion's soldiers was killed.

In 1975 Yair was appointed commander of the Company Commanders Course and was sent to the United States to attend a one-year Command and Staff course of the United States Army.

On his return from the United States Yair was promoted to the rank of colonel and served as head of Combat Theory at the Infantry and Paratroopers Chief Division. In Operation Litani, Yair commanded a combined brigade battle team of two radar school battalions: the 906th and 17th Battalions and the 53rd Armoured Battalion, under the Infantry and Paratroopers Chief Division, Brigadier general Uri Simchoni. The forces, under Yair's command, conquered Tel Chalaaboun, Tel 850 and junction Chaff – al Hawa, killing 55 terrorists. Then, Yair founded the Anti-Missile Brigade, "Hazi HaEsh" Division, and was appointed commander of the Officers Academy.

In 1981 Yair was appointed commander of the Paratroopers Brigade. That same year, as the Paratrooper Brigade Commander, Yair led two raid operations deep in Lebanon, in response to artillery fire between the PLO and the IDF. Yair commanded Operation "Zilzal" More than 40 km (25 mi) deep in Lebanon. In this operation, Yair's force had one man killed and seven wounded, and under heavy fire coming from all the hills and buildings around, Yair managed to rescue the force with the help of two Yasur helicopters, which returned to Israel with Bullet Holes all around.

In the first Lebanon War Yair served as the Paratrooper Brigade Commander as well. In accordance with Yair's proposal, the Paratroopers' Brigade made a vertical flank – an amphibious landing from the sea north of Sidon in the depths of Lebanon, about 70 km (43 mi) from the border, the brigade continued to lead IDF forces to the suburbs of Beirut. During the first three days, the brigade advanced and fought, detached from the rest of the IDF forces, moving from the direction of the Israeli border up north. The choice of the mountain axis – 70 km (43 mi) long, made in light of the joining to the Armoured corps forces, was supposed to delay the brigade's forces, compared to the advanced IDF forces on the short coastal axis, only 12 km (7.5 mi) towards Beirut. However, in test of time, Yair's decision was correct, and the Paratroopers were indeed the first force to arrive to Beirut and to join the Christian Forces on the Beirut – Damascus axis. During the battles, Yair was lightly wounded.

After the Sabra and Shatila massacre, performed by the Christian phalanxes, Yair entered the refugee camp at the head of a group of soldiers to reassure its terrified residents. Following the distress among his fighters, who witnessed Sabra and Shatila events, Yair demanded to meet with Prime Minister Menachem Begin, and instead met with Defense Minister Arik Sharon. Yair demanded that he take responsibility for what happened in Beirut, so that the blame would not fall on IDF fighters.

After the war Yair was appointed Division Commander, and he built and established the Airborne 98th Division. After converting to the Armoury Core, he commanded an armoured division in reserve, the "Pillar of Fire" Division and a Battalion Commander's course. During this time he returned to the academy to complete his master's degree in psychology at Bar-Ilan University, while studying for an MBA at Tel Aviv University.

In 1987 before graduating, he was called to the post of commander of the Lebanese sector, Division 91, when the IDF was inside Lebanese territory. In this position, Yair made a significant change in the planning of operations and activities in the sector, where instead of the initiative and planning of operations being carried out at the command and division level and from there to the battalions and companies, Yair decided that the commanders in the field would be the ones to initiate and plan the activities. This change has doubled the amount of activities and operations and streamlined them. Under his command, the division carried out about eighty operations and raids across the border.

In 1988 Yair was promoted to the rank of major general and was appointed commander of the Northern Corps, which commanded five divisions whose mission was fighting on the Syrian front.

In 1992 Yair was appointed head of the Manpower Directorate at the General Staff of the IDF.

Immediately on taking office, he made a fundamental change in the method of recruitment to the IDF each candidate for recruitment will go through the selection system, fulfil his preferences and wishes and according to this will be assigned to the various units even before his enlistment. This significant change resulted in the shortening of the recruitment process to one day instead of 4–5 days, allowing the start of basic training within one day and over 85% of the recruits were placed according to their first or second preferences. He also made changes to improve the service conditions of the permanent servants and established the "Hever" club which was the first consumer club in the country. As part of his role, he chaired the committee, alongside Professor Asa Kasher, who worked for three years to compile and write the Code of Ethics for the IDF – an "IDF Spirit" document.

In 1990 he published a book, Etty from Lebanon, about the paratroopers' fighting in the 1982 Lebanon War.

In 1995 when he was about to be released, he was asked by Prime Minister and Defense Minister Yitzhak Rabin to serve as an IDF attaché in Washington, during the period of contacts and talks on an agreement with the Syrians, and served there for about three years.

== After military service ==
In 1998 Yair was released and became involved in social and educational activities, he serves as chairman, on a purely voluntary basis, of a number of associations that operate in these areas. Yair serves as chairman of the organisation that operates rehab facilities from drugs and alcohol in Ilanot and Hartuv, he is the chairman "After Me!" – Youth Leads a Change, a social educational movement which prepares thousands of youth and young people from the geographical and social periphery for significant service in the IDF and leadership positions in the community.

Since 1982, while still in active service, Yair helped establish and promote the "Association for the Advancement of Education in Jaffa" in the most difficult area of mixed Jaffa, and he continues this activity to this day. Yair, served for seven years as chairman of the board of directors of Hadassah Youth.

Today Yair is the chair of "Yahad – United for Israel's Soldiers" after merging the Association for the Welfare of Israel's Soldiers and the LIBI Foundation into one organisation, in 2015. Upon taking office, he made a number of significant changes, first and foremost stating that 100% of all donations will go to the soldiers. He stated that the soldier at the center is the organisations primary goal, the organisation's expenses were significantly reduced and the number of volunteers for the organisation increased.

Since 2009 he has been leading a unique leadership program – the Rabin Program at the IDC Herzliya. The program is unique in academia, bringing together outstanding students from the various schools of the Interdisciplinary Centre, for an annual program. The course, taught by Yair himself, is called "Practical Leadership," which expresses the unique concept of leadership that Yair developed about 40 years ago and which he teaches in the IDF and various civilian bodies. It combines various lectures and practical experience of students, initiating and establishing social projects.

In parallel with his volunteer activities in the various associations, Yair works and is active in the business field. Yair served and still is chairman and a strategic consultant to companies and business ventures in various fields. Among other things, the infrastructure company that built the Krayot bypass highway, Yagur Junction and the Jezreel Valley railway, the Supergum company, high-tech companies, agricultural development, building ventures and other companies. Since 2003, he serves as a strategic advisor to one of the largest law firms in the United States with the help of a team of experts he has assembled.

Yair holds a bachelor's degree in psychology from Bar-Ilan University.

In 2009 he joined the faculty of the School of Government, Diplomacy and Strategy at IDC Herzliya.

In 2022 Yair was honored as one of the torchbearers in the national Israeli Independence Day ceremony.

== Public Committees ==
- The head of the committee, along with Professor Asa Kasher, for writing the code of ethics "IDF spirit".
- The Committee for the Investigation of the Events of Joseph's Tomb in Nablus.
- Committee for the Investigation of the Events of Mount Ebal – 2000
- Committee for Determining Eligibility for Compensation for Captive Persons – 2001
- Committee for the Study of Combat and the Production of Lessons and Conclusions in the 91st Division, during the Second Lebanon War – 2006
- The Committee for the Examination of the Behavior of IDF Commanders in the Second Lebanon War, based on IDF values.

== Personal life ==
Yair lives in Hod HaSharon, is married to Edna, a father of four children and a grandfather of 13 grandchildren.

In 1990 he lost his daughter, Captain Shlomit Yair, who was the operations officer of the 113 Apache Squadron and was killed in a plane crash with four of her fellow pilots.
