= Friends of the Israel Defense Forces =

American nonprofit that funds programs for Israel Defense Forces personnel

Friends of the Israel Defense Forces (FIDF) ארגון ידידי צה״ל בארה״ב
- Founded: 1981; 45 years ago
- Type: Nonprofit organization
- Tax ID no.: 13-3156445
- Legal status: 501(c)(3) nonprofit organization
- Location: New York City
- Coordinates: 40.7539128°N 73.9864173°W
- Chief Executive Officer: Nadav Padan
- Interim Chairman: Nily Falic
- Revenue: $281,960,000 (2023)
- Expenses: $143,170,000 (2023)
- Employees: 137 (2022)
- Volunteers: 600 (2022)
- Website: fidf.org

Friends of the Israel Defense Forces (FIDF) is a United States–based 501(c)(3) nonprofit organization that raises funds for programs that support the health, well-being, and education of active duty Israel Defense Forces (IDF) soldiers, veterans, and bereaved families. It was established in 1981 and is headquartered in New York City. FIDF describes its mission as providing "critical support for the health, well-being, and education of Israel's protectors", to "protect the State of Israel, democratic values, and Western Civilization."

The organization states that it is the official U.S. charity authorized to collect donations for IDF soldiers. Reporting in 2025 noted that the IDF spokesperson did not confirm exclusivity and instead referred inquiries to the Association for Israel's Soldiers, while another U.S. nonprofit claimed equivalent authorization.

The FIDF typically raises tens of millions of dollars per year in donations toward the IDF, with higher amounts seen during times of turmoil. In fiscal year 2023, FIDF reported $281.96 million in revenue, $143.17 million in expenses, and $336.43 million in total assets, reflecting a significant increase from 2022 during the first year of the Gaza war. Charity evaluators have generally rated the governance of the organization favorably. Critics of the organization have claimed that the FIDF works to "effectively subsidize the Israeli military".

== History ==
FIDF was established in 1981 by a group of Holocaust survivors to fund educational and well-being programs for IDF service members and families of the fallen. FIDF states that it provides "critical support for the health, well-being, and education" of IDF soldiers and veterans and their families through scholarships, family services, and resilience programs.

The organization is recognized as a tax-exempt 501(c)(3) charity in the United States and has been tax-exempt since July 1983. FIDF states that, under U.S. and Israeli law, it does not fund arms or military operations and restricts grants to well-being, health, education, and bereavement support.

Over four decades the organization expanded into a national network of U.S. chapters that fund scholarships, family support, rehabilitation, and capital projects. The group presents itself as coordinating with Israel's Ministry of Defense and the Association for Israel's Soldiers on program needs and compliance.

FIDF's public fundraising surges during and after major conflicts involving Israel. A 2017 Los Angeles gala raised a reported $53.8 million, including a $16.6 million gift from Oracle Corporation cofounder Larry Ellison for well-being facilities on an IDF training camp. In 2018 the FIDF reached a donation milestone, with $139.3 million raised to benefit soldiers.

In In 2023 the organization's IRS filing showed revenue rising to $281.96 million, up from $89.34 million in 2022, a sharp surge attributed to the Gaza war.

FIDF publicizes letters from IDF leadership and describes itself as the official U.S. partner authorized to raise charitable donations for IDF soldiers. In 2025, JTA reported that the IDF spokesperson did not confirm FIDF's exclusivity and referred questions to the Association for Israel's Soldiers. American Friends of LIBI asserted that it holds equivalent authorization. CharityWatch's executive director characterized such messaging in the charity sector as "playing fast and loose with the facts", a general caution about nonprofit marketing claims rather than a specific finding of legal violation.

=== Notable people ===
==== Current staff ====
- Nadav Padan, retired Israeli major general and chief executive of FIDF from 2025
- Nily Falic, national chair and past chair who returned to the role on an interim basis in 2025
- Haim Saban, major donor and event chair in Los Angeles

==== Past staff ====
- Yehiel Gozal, former Israeli brigadier, former FIDF national director and CEO
- Yitzhak Gershon, retired Israeli Aluf (Major General), CEO from 2008 to 2014
- Jared Kushner, son-in-law of Donald Trump, formerly sat on the FIDF board of directors

== Governance and organization ==
FIDF reports more than two dozen regional chapters across the United States, coordinated by a national office that works with Israeli counterparts on project pipelines and compliance.

Public filings list executives and directors and disclose compensation, while the charity reports a mix of paid staff and volunteers across regions. Despite claiming to be a "non-political, non-military organization", CEOs of the FIDF have included past Israeli politicians and military personnel, including Ehud Olmert and Yitzhak Gershon.

=== Programs and activities ===
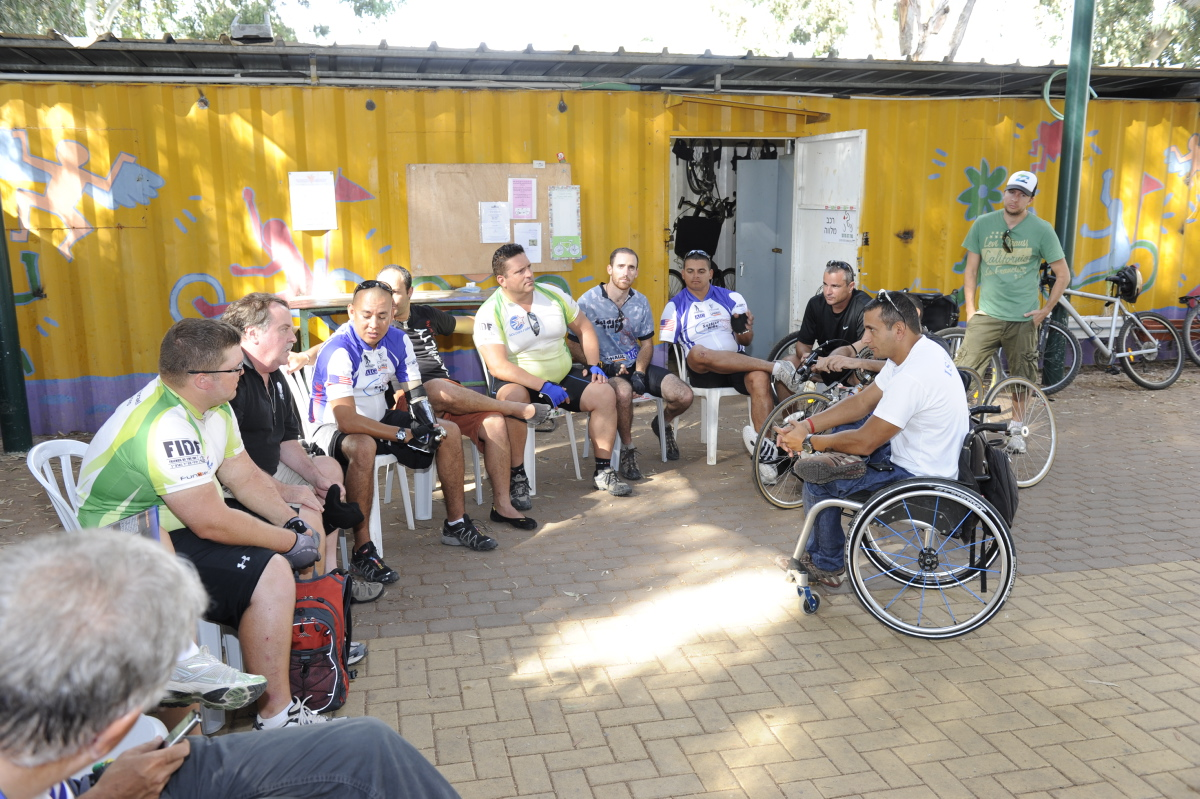
Wounded Warrior Project Soldier Ride participants and Israeli wounded veterans meet during the 2010 joint adaptive cycling tour organized in partnership with FIDF.

FIDF funds family-support programs, memorial and bereavement initiatives, and financial assistance for basic needs through vouchers and grants administered with Israeli partners. The organization also funds housing, stipends, counseling, and community services for IDF "lone soldiers," defined as service members without immediate family in Israel. The FIDF provides packages to active service lone soldiers, and pays for flights for lone soldiers to go home and visit their families. Other services provided to lone soldiers include monetary gifts, holiday vouchers, housing, and recreational activities.

Through its IMPACT! program, FIDF provides four-year academic scholarships for former combat and combat-support soldiers from low-income backgrounds and pairs recipients with donors, having reported its 20,000th scholarship recipient in 2024 with continued expansion in 2025.

Programs include physical and psychological rehabilitation, retreats, and bereavement support for families of the dead, delivered in coordination with Israeli agencies, as well as rest and recuperation, cultural activities, and holiday programming for units and families.

Capital projects have included well-being and education facilities on the IDF's training campus in the Negev and synagogues and community spaces on bases. During crises the charity runs time-bound appeals focused on medical equipment, resilience, and family support, implemented with the Association for Israel's Soldiers and the Ministry of Defense.

In the United States, FIDF supports the claim that American Judaism is synonymous with support for Israel and the Israeli military. The organization also funds construction projects, subsidizes foreign-born soldiers in the military, and offers donors the opportunity to subsidize entire military units through their "Adopt a Battalion" and "Adopt a Brigade" programs. The FIDF tax disclosure for 2022 shows the organization spent roughly $2.5 million on their Adopt a Brigade program to "sponsor the needs of the 24 brigades adopted by FIDF (over 50,000 soldiers)." The Miami chapter of the organization previously sponsored the Golani Brigade, whose soldiers "have fought in all of Israeli's wars".

=== Fundraising and finances ===
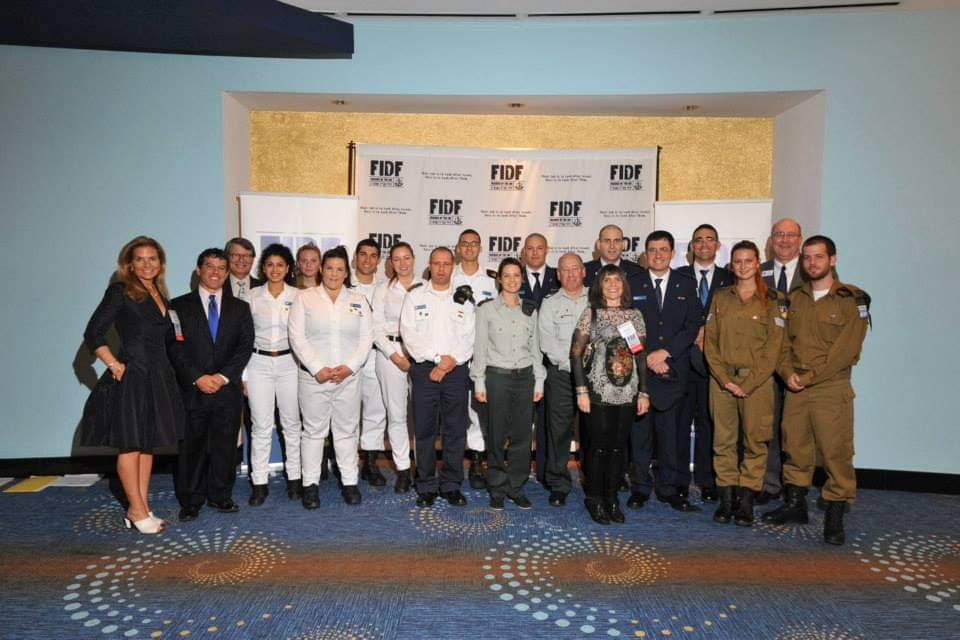
Israeli Navy Band at a FIDF gala in Atlanta, Georgia in 2014.

The FIDF raises the majority of its funds at gala events in the United States which are frequently attended by wealthy members of the Jewish community, Israeli lawmakers, government ministers, senior IDF officers, and active duty soldiers. Galas, which have been compared to "a rich kid's rowdy bar mitzvah", feature silent auctions, where guests bid on items like Gucci bags, Equinox memberships, and VIP tickets to Shaq's Fun House. Event sponsors have included the Kushner Real Estate Group. The Western Region gala in 2017 reported $53.8 million raised, including a single $16.6 million gift for capital facilities. The FIDF also raises money through music festivals and performances. Past events have been supported by acts such as Pharrell Williams, Seal, The Tenors, David Foster, Gene Simmons, The Beach Boys, Iggy Azalea, Lil Dicky, DJ Vice, and Mark McGrath. Stevie Wonder was originally scheduled to perform at a FIDF gala in 2012, but dropped out after an online petition called on him to not attend and to boycott Israeli Apartheid. Wonder stated that he was not aware of the purpose of the organization, and that he believed performing at the event would be in conflict with his status as a UN Messenger of Peace.

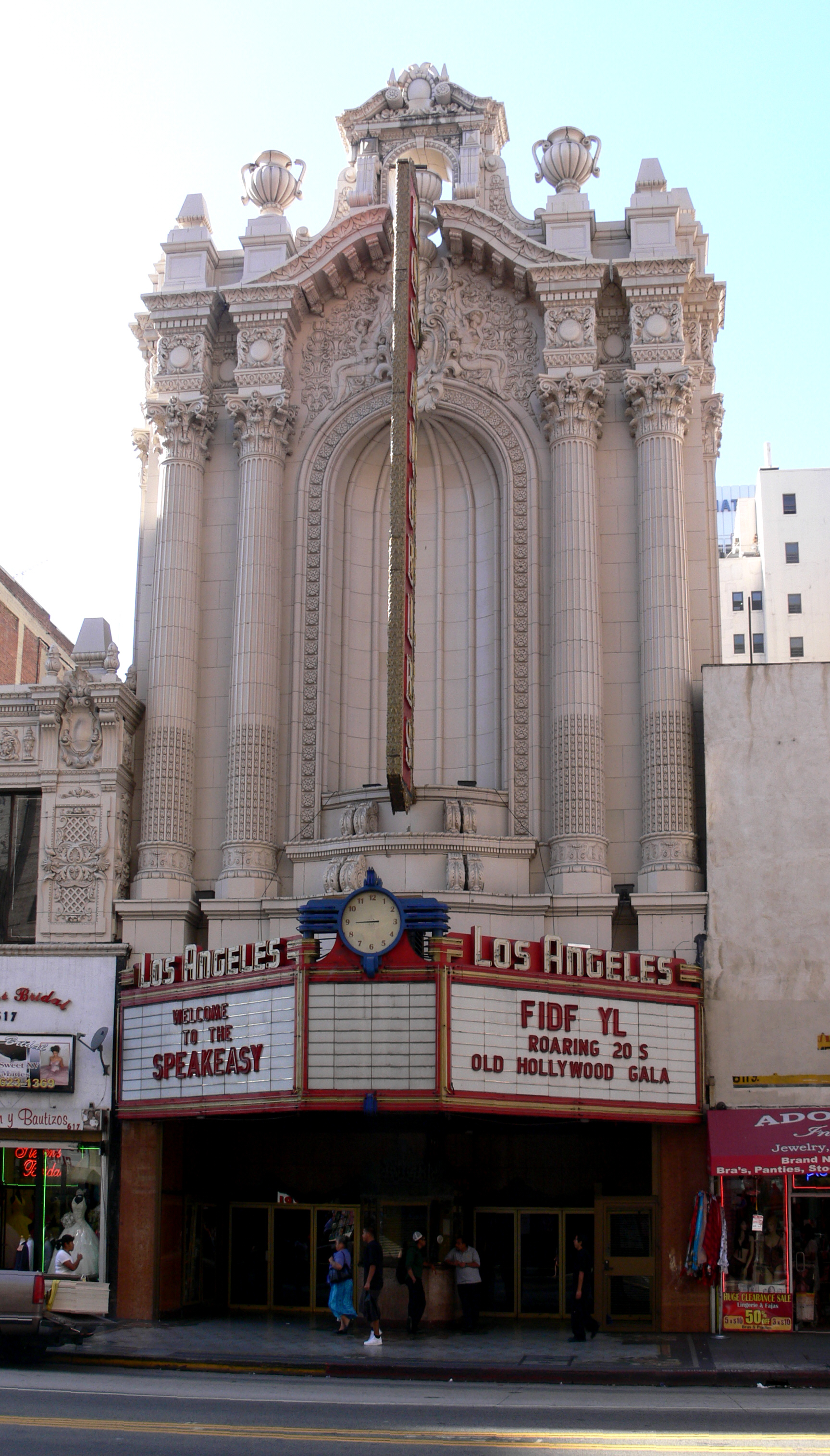
Los Angeles Theatre displaying a marquee for a FIDF event in 2008.

Hollywood actors and celebrities frequently make appearances at FIDF events and fundraisers. Celebrities who have attended past FIDF events include Barbra Streisand, Sylvester Stallone, Arnold Schwarzenegger, Pamela Anderson, Robert De Niro, Ashton Kutcher, Mike Tyson, Gerard Butler, Fran Drescher, Mark Wahlberg, Antonio Banderas, Katharine McPhee, Andy Garcia, Avi Arad, and Chris Tucker. In 2019, FIDF sponsored Draymond Green's trip to Israel, where he met Israeli president Reuven Rivlin and shot rifles at an Israeli Police training center. Posts of the trip on social media garnered criticism, including from Shaun King of Black Lives Matter.

Israeli politicians and military leaders have also made speeches at FIDF events, including president Benjamin Neanyahu, army general Benny Gantz, Israeli Intelligence chief Herzi Halevi, and Chief of Staff Gabi Ashkenazi. Leader of Christians United for Israel, John Hagee, has also been featured at FIDF fundraisers.

IRS filings show revenue of $89.34 million in 2022 and $281.96 million in 2023, with 2023 expenses of $143.17 million and total assets of $336.43 million. From 2018 to 2022, the FIDF received $450 million in donations and membership fees. In the weeks following October 7, 2023 the organization raised over $50 million. Reporting found that only $31 million of this $50 million raised had been transferred to Israel by October 27, 2023. In November 2023, Yale University donated $1 million to FIDF through a donor-advised fund.

High-profile donors and corporate partners have supported scholarships and capital projects. FIDF describes work in direct coordination with Israel's Ministry of Defense and with the Association for Israel's Soldiers. Notable billionaire donors include the Adelson family, Home Depot founder Bernie Marcus, Oracle founder Larry Ellison, and mogul and board member Haim Saban. Several corporate donors offer gift-matching programs to FIDF, including BlackRock, Vanguard, Bank of America, Northrop Grumman, Honeywell, Google, Microsoft, Apple, Starbucks, and McDonald's.

Charity Navigator lists FIDF with a three-star rating based on accountability and finance, leadership and adaptability, and culture and community scores. CharityWatch has reported on the organization's internal governance issues while noting that high asset levels had not led to an automatic ratings downgrade in its past assessments.

==== Notable donors ====
- Sheldon Adelson, American businessman
- Miriam Adelson, Israeli-American billionaire
- Simon Cowell, English reality TV judge
- Michael Dell, CEO of Dell Technologies
- Yechiel Eckstein, founder of International Fellowship of Christians and Jews, donated $6 million in 2016
- Larry Ellison, founder of Oracle, has donated $25 million to the organization
- Jeffrey Epstein, American financier and child sex offender
- Jan Koum, American billionaire and co-founder of WhatsApp
- Jared Kushner, American businessman whose family donated $315,000 between 2011 and 2013
- Paul Marciano, co-founder of Guess?
- Bernie Marcus, founder of Home Depot, donated nearly $13 million between 2009 and 2022
- Mikhael Mirilashvili, Georgian oligarch
- Haim Saban, Israeli and American media proprietor and investor
- Cheryl Saban, American author
- David Shapell, Polish real estate developer
- Paul Singer, founder of Elliot Investment Management
- Steve Tisch, New York Giants president from 2005-2025
- Donald Trump, claimed to have donated $250k in 2007 but the donation was actually covered by an unnamed third party
- Casey Wasserman, American businessman
- Robert Kraft, American businessman

== Public profile and reception ==
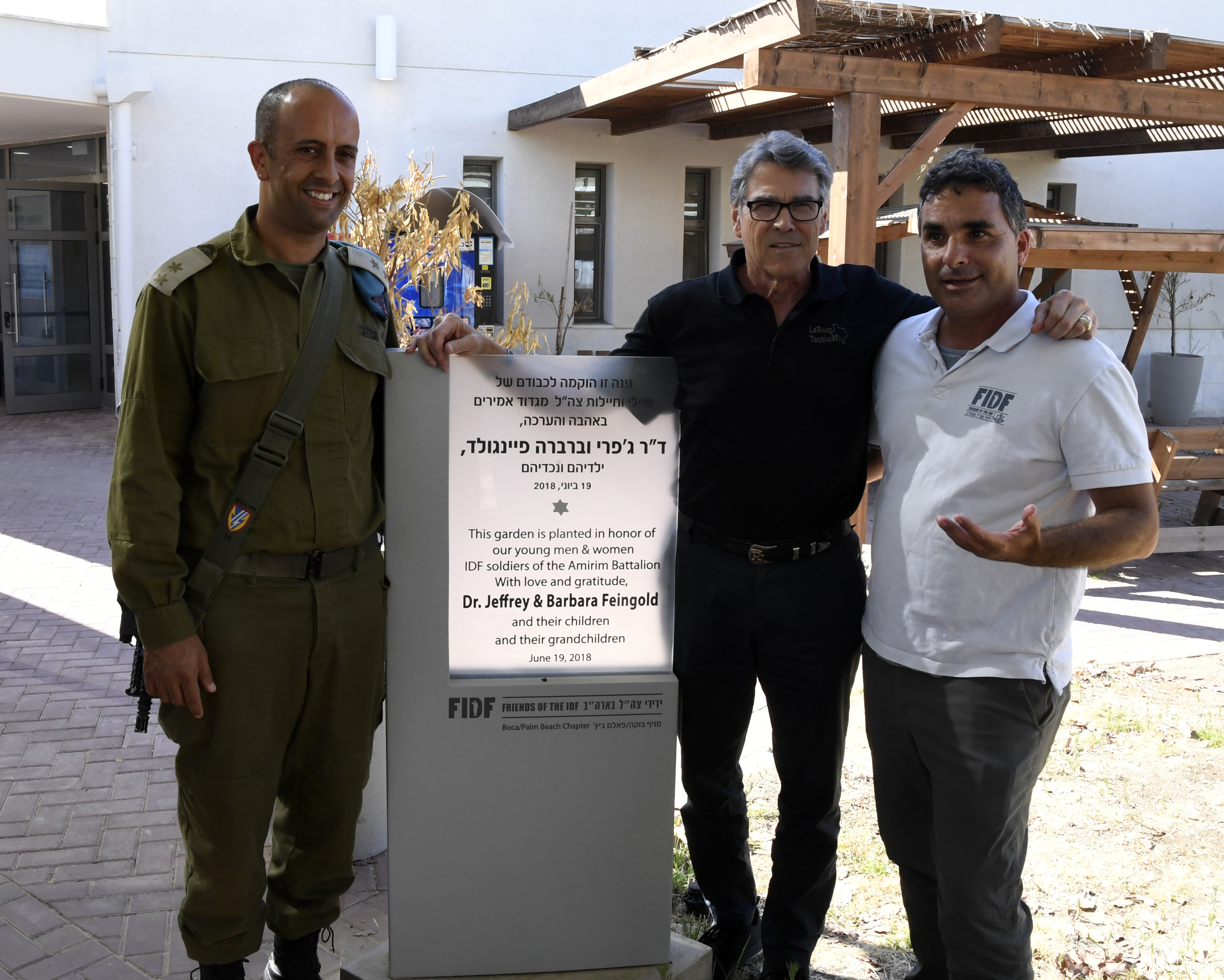
Rick Perry at a FIDF monument in Jerusalem in 2019.

Media coverage regularly highlights large-scale gala fundraising and capital projects, as well as collaborations with Israeli institutions. In 2024 Israeli press reported on plans for a national mental health and resilience center for soldiers in Netanya, a project aligned with donor-funded resilience priorities.

=== Criticism and controversy ===
FIDF fundraising events have been the focus of protests by anti-war and Palestinian-solidarity groups, notably at the Hiller Aviation Museum in San Carlos, California, in November 2023. Local outlets documented hundreds to more than one thousand protesters and a significant police presence outside the gala. FIDF has also been accused of projecting extreme Zionist views, including publishing Greater Israel materials. The FIDF also drew criticizm for promoting controversial IDF Unit 8200 analyst Eliyahu Yossian, who had previously claimed that "there are no innocents in Gaza" and that Israel should attack Gaza "with the aim of revenge, zero morality, maximum corpses".

In 2016, the organization, along with other organizations and philanthropists, was sued for $34.5 billion by Palestinian Americans over the FIDF's connections to Israeli settlements in the occupied West Bank.

Data released by the US Small Business Administration showed that FIDF received a Paycheck Protection Program loan between $2 to $5 million during the COVID-19 pandemic.

In 2024, Arnie Draiman, a consultant who assesses governance of Israel-related charities for clients, accused FIDF of having excessive reserve funds. Draiman stated "Here is an example of a nonprofit holding so much money they don't know what to do with it. They just hold on to it for the proverbial rainy day... will your money be used at all? Who knows." The FIDF's financial report published in 2021 showed they had $174 million in cash reserves, which a FIDF spokesperson stated remained unchanged at the end of 2022. In response to questioning on the reserves at the start of the Gaza war in 2023, FIDF stated that they only wire money when specifically requested to do so by the army and Defense Ministry.

In 2025, JTA reported that the IDF did not confirm FIDF's claim to be the only U.S. charity authorized to raise funds for IDF soldiers and noted competing claims by non-profit American Friends of LIBI. CharityWatch covered the same controversy and summarized donor-education concerns about broad marketing claims in the sector.

In July 2025, Ynet published a leaked internal report by the FIDF that highlighted alleged mismanagement and a toxic workplace. The controversy centered on Levovitz, who was accused of cronyism, power consolidation, and lavish spending. The internal report stated that Levovitz effectively assumed the role of CEO without board approval and marginalized incumbent CEO Weil. The report accused Levovitz of giving contracts to a company owned by a personal acquaintance without going through the bidding process, and travel and hotel expenses claimed by Levovitz to be "well beyond what FIDF's bylaws typically allow." Further allegations included misleading donors and holding board meetings without legal supervision. Following the publication of the report by Ynet, FIDF hired a law firm and a PR company to deal with the fallout. FIDF announced the resignations of board chair Morey Levovitz and CEO Steven Weil.

After the resignations, Nily Falic, a past chair, served as interim national chair while Maj. Gen. (res.) Nadav Padan moved into the chief executive role.The organization said it would improve transparency and culture, and it appointed interim leadership and later a new chief executive. Padan later reaffirmed the organization's claim of exclusive authorization in the U.S., a point that remained contested in press coverage.

In February 2026, released documents on deceased child sex trafficker Jeffrey Epstein showed that he gifted $25,000 to the FIDF in 2006, along with $15,000 to the Jewish National Fund.
