= Nadav Padan =

Israeli general

Nadav Padan is an Israeli military officer and CEO of Friends of the Israel Defense Forces, based in New York.

== Career ==
Padan previously served as FIDF's national director.

Following the October 7 Attacks, on October 8, 2023 Padan returned to Israel as a senior commander in the IDF Southern Command to fight in the Gaza War.

In June 2025, he was appointed CEO, following the resignation of chairman Morey Levovitz and CEO Steve Weil.
