= IDF Code of Ethics =

Official code of conduct of Israel's military

The Spirit of the IDF
- Badge of the Israeli Defense Forces

Official website
- Archived 9 June 2026 at the Wayback Machine

The IDF Code of Ethics, officially known as the Spirit of the Israel Defense Forces (Hebrew: רוח צה"ל Ruaḥ Tzahal), is the code of conduct developed by the Israel Defense Forces to formally delineate the morality and etiquette that should be displayed by an Israeli soldier. It was first drafted in the 1990s, when a joint committee of military officers and professional ethicists was formed for the purpose of creating an official framework to disseminate among new and existing recruits.

== Development ==
In 1994, the IDF recognized the need for a formal ethical framework and established a committee to develop what would become "The Spirit of the IDF." Major General Yoram Yair, who was serving as the commander of the Manpower Directorate within the General Staff at the time, led this committee. The team included Professor Asa Kasher from Tel Aviv University, a philosopher with expertise in Professional Ethics.

Upon completion and adoption of the code, a standing order was issued stating that after five years, a review committee would assess the code's integration into the IDF. However, the initial attempt at integration failed, partly because, as some critics pointed out, there was no strategic implementation plan.

By the year 2000, with a view to revising the IDF's ethical code, the Chief Education Officer, Brigadier General Elazar Stern, appointed a new committee. This committee consisted of several esteemed professors, Avi Sagi, Danny Statman, Avshalom Adam, Shaul Smilansky, Noam Zohar, and Moshe Halbertal, who were known for their expertise in ethics and moral philosophy. High-ranking IDF officers, including Major General Yishai Beer and Colonel Yaakov Castel, were also part of the committee. The General Staff approved the revisions, leading to a new iteration of "The Spirit of the IDF," which differed from the original document created by Major General Yoram Yair and Professor Kasher.

=== Implementation and integration ===
Dr. Avshalom Adam developed the implementation strategy for the ethical code, and the Chief of General Staff later approved it. The process was first integrated within the IDF's Ground Forces, with the Artillery Corps serving as the pilot group.

Traditionally, each new conscript was given a copy of "The Spirit of the IDF" as part of their service book, although this practice has ceased. However, the principles of the code are still disseminated during basic training through educational lectures.

=== Modifications ===
In 2022, under the leadership of Chief of General Staff Aviv Kochavi, an additional value, "Stateliness" was incorporated into "The Spirit of the IDF", reflecting the evolving nature of military ethics and the importance of aligning with contemporary values and strategic thinking.

== Criticism ==
The IDF code of ethics, as written by Kasher and Yaldin, considers minimizing "injury to the lives of the combatants of the state" as a higher priority than minimizing "injury to the lives of other persons (outside the state) who are not involved in terror, when they are not under the effective control of the state". In other words, the lives of IDF soldiers take precedence over the lives of innocent non-Israeli civilians. Muhammad Ali Khalidi writes that this ethic is contrary to "centuries of theorizing about the rules of war". In fact, Khalidi points out that Kasher and Yaldin stated they "reject the common conception of noncombatants having preference over combatants" in their 2005 paper Military Ethics of Fighting Terror: An Israeli Perspective.

According to Khalidi, this ethic was demonstrated during the 2008 Gaza war, when 1,419 Palestinians were killed (82% civilians). The IDF colonel Herzi Halevi said: "First complete the mission, next defend the soldiers' lives, and finally minimize the damage to the Palestinian civilian population." Likewise, another IDF commander said,

I want aggression! If we suspect a building, we take down this building! If there's a suspect in one of the floors of that building, we shell it. No second thoughts. If it's either them or us, let it be them. No second thoughts. If someone approaches us, unarmed, and keeps coming despite our warning shot in the air, he's dead. No one has second thoughts. Let errors take their lives, not ours.

== See also ==
- Ethical code § Examples
- Law of war
  - Just war theory
  - Legitimate military target
- Dahiya doctrine
