= Husam Badran =

Former leader of Hamas (born 1966)

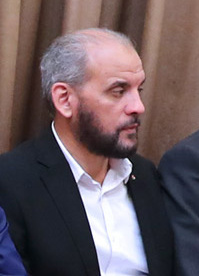
- Badran as part of a delegation to Iran in 2019
- Born: 11 January 1966 (age 60)
- Occupations: International spokesperson for Hamas, former leader of Hamas military wing

Husam Badran (born January 11, 1966) is the former leader of Hamas’s military wing in the northern West Bank. He was the orchestrator of several suicide bombings during the Second Intifada with the highest number of fatalities including the 2001 bombing which resulted in the Dolphinarium discotheque massacre in Tel Aviv which killed 21 people. Currently Badran serves as the international spokesperson for Hamas using Twitter, Facebook, and news media to encourage Hamas militants to commit acts of political violence against Israelis and the Israeli government. He lives in Doha, Qatar.

Badran is originally from Nablus, in the West Bank.

== Badran and the Second Intifada ==
The Second Intifada, or Palestinian uprising against Israel, was marked by widespread violence which erupted on Friday, September 28, 2000 and lasted until 2005. Protests began when Ariel Sharon visited Temple Mount in the Old City Jerusalem with 1,000 Israeli police in what Palestinians saw as a blatant attempt to provoke them. Protests quickly turned into terrorism targeting Israeli civilians on buses, restaurants, and on city streets. During this period, Husam Badran was the commander of Hamas’s military wing in the Samaria area [3] and was involved in orchestrating the suicide bombing on Sbarro Pizza, the Dolphinarium Discotheque bombing, the bombing of Passover seder at the Park Hotel, and the bombing of Matza restaurant in Haifa as part of the Second Intifada attacks. More than 100 people were killed in Second Intifada terrorist attacks ordered by Badran.

Badran was arrested in 2002 [7] in as a part of Operation “Defensive Shield," a large scale military operation initiated by the Israeli Defense Forces (IDF) against Palestinian Militants in the West Bank. In 2004, he was sentenced to 17 years of imprisonment for his role in the Second Intifada. [6] But he was released in 2011 as part of the Gilad Shalit prisoner exchange and expelled to Qatar.

=== 2001 bombing of Sbarro Pizza in Jerusalem ===
Badran took part in orchestrating the 2001 bombing of Sbarro Pizza in Jerusalem, which led to the death of 15 Israelis and injured 130 others. The attack, which took place on August 9 at 2:00pm, was carried out by a lone suicide bomber who transported an explosive device, enhanced with screws and nails, in a guitar case and entered the crowded restaurant filled with mothers and children.

=== 2001 bombing of Dolphinarium Discotheque in Tel Aviv ===
Just before midnight on Friday June 1, a suicide bomber stood in line with a large group of teenagers waiting to get inside a disco. While in line, the bomber detonated the explosives attached to his body killing 21 people and wounding 120 others. The explosive contained screws and nails in an effort to increase the extent of injuries. Most of the murdered teens were from the former Soviet Union and had planned to attend a dance party inside the Dolphinarium Disco. Other young people standing in line at the adjacent nightclub, Patcha, were also killed in the attack. 17 people were killed immediately in the suicide bomb attack, and another four died after succumbing to their injuries.

=== 2002 suicide bombing of Passover Seder at Park Hotel ===
On March 27, 2002, a suicide bomber entered the Park Hotel in the coastal city of Netanya where 250 guests were celebrating the Passover Holiday. The terrorist then walked into the dining room of the hotel and detonated his explosive. Thirty people were killed in the explosion and 140 were injured, 20 of them seriously.

=== 2002 suicide bombing of Matza restaurant in Haifa ===
On March 31, 2002, in the crowded Matza restaurant in the northern Israeli city of Haifa, a suicide bomber set off an explosion, killing himself and at least 14 other people. At least 33 people were wounded in the terror attack and taken to hospitals. Three of the injured were in critical condition. At least 14 people were killed at the scene and another person died during surgery.

== Current role as Hamas international spokesman ==
Since his deportation from Palestine, Badran has been based in Qatar where he acts as a media spokesman for the Hamas movement, often emailing statements to various news agencies to register official Hamas positions on Middle Eastern news, offering support for violent actions orchestrated by Hamas and other Palestinian militants, and expressing dissent against violent Israeli military activities. He also makes use of social media to express support of Hamas and to decry the Israeli government. While his Facebook page has been removed for reasons unstated, his Twitter page remains active.

== Role in establishing new headquarters and funding Hamas ==
According to the IDF, Badran has been active in sending money transfers totaling hundreds of thousands of dollars to Palestine in an effort to fund the Hamas terror network in and around Nablus in the Northern West Bank. IDF operations by 2016 had thwarted terror attacks ordered and funded by Badran. He is also responsible for announcing Qatar's uninterrupted financial support of Hamas.
