= Yitzhak Gershon =

Israeli Major general

- יצחק גרשון
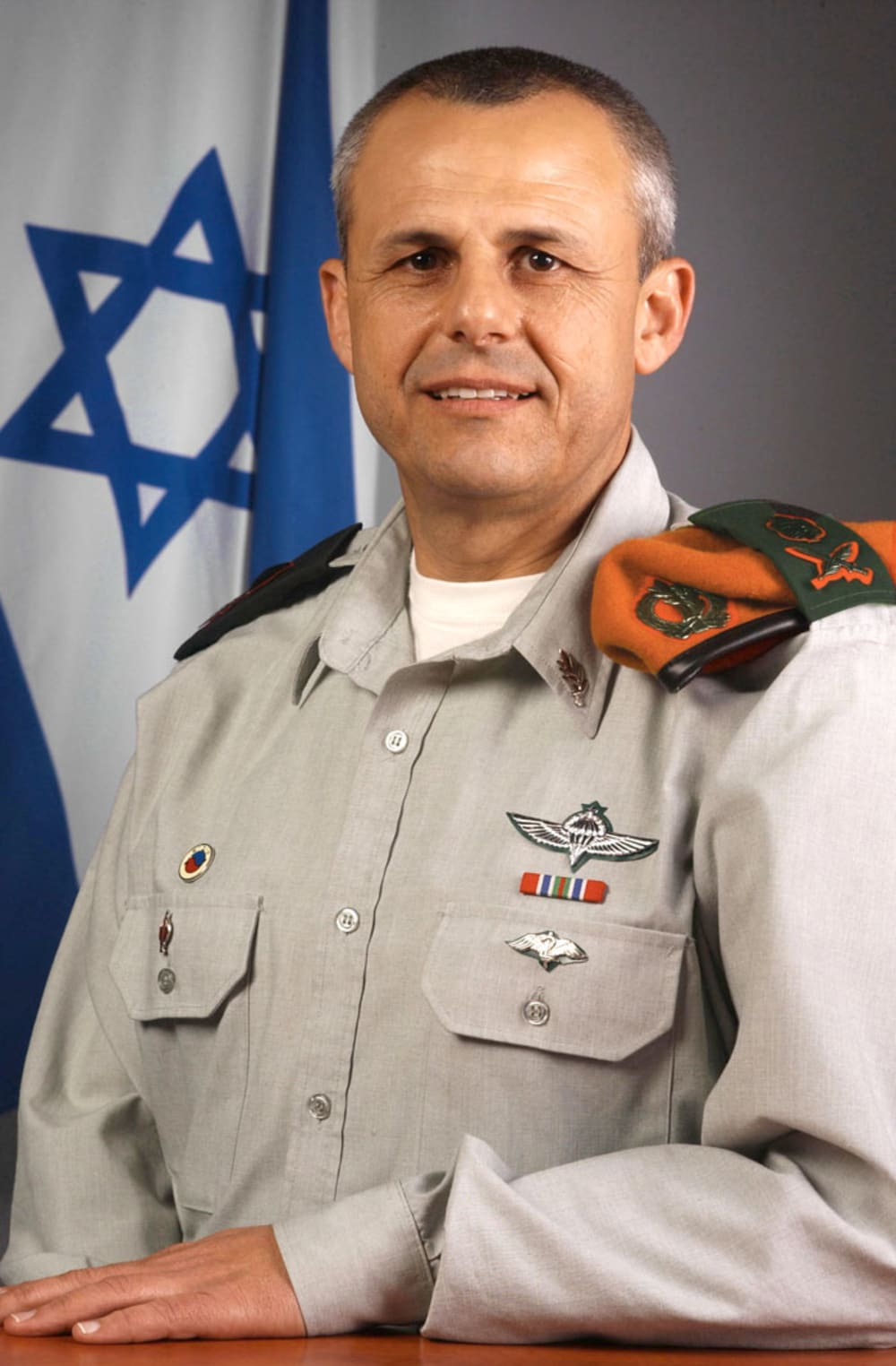
- Born: Israel
- Military career
- Allegiance: Israel
- Branch: Israel Defense Forces
- Service years: 1977–2008
- Rank: Aluf (Major General)
- Nickname: Jerry
- Unit: Paratroopers Brigade
- Commands: 202 "Tsefa" (Viper) paratroop battalion, Regional Brigade in South Lebanon, 55th Paratroopers Brigade, Paratroopers Brigade, 98th Paratroopers Division, Judea and Samaria Division, Home Front Command
- Conflicts: Operation Litani; 1982 Lebanon War; South Lebanon conflict (1985–2000); First Intifada; Second Intifada; 2006 Lebanon War

Yitzhak Gershon (Hebrew: יצחק גרשון) is a retired Israeli Aluf (Major General) and former commander of the Israel Defense Forces Home Front Command. He has served in various capacities within the Paratroopers Brigade, participating in notable operations such as Operation Litani and Operation Law and Order. Gershon also commanded the Judea and Samaria Division during the Second Intifada and oversaw the IDF's Operation Defensive Shield.

After his military service, he was CEO of FIDF, and chairs several organizations. In 2020, he was appointed chairman of the Israel Airports Authority.

== Military service ==
Yitzhak Gershon enlisted in the Israel Defense Forces in February 1977 and volunteered for the Shaked Reconnaissance Unit. In the unit, Gershon completed training as a fighter and a reconnaissance course. While attending the Squad Commanders Course for reconnaissance units at the IDF NCO School, he participated as a fighter in Operation Litani. He earned the nickname "Jerry" from his platoon sergeant during basic training. Afterward, he remained as an instructor in the course and later attended the IDF Infantry Officers' Course. Since the Shaked Reconnaissance Unit was disbanded, Gershon chose to transfer to the Paratroopers Brigade, inspired by the course commander, Doron Rubin, and served as a platoon commander. In the 1982 Lebanon War, he commanded Company May 1981 in the 890th Battalion of the Paratroopers Brigade and led it from the amphibious landing at the mouth of the Awali River to Beirut. He later served as the commander of the support company in the battalion. He was subsequently appointed deputy battalion commander and operations officer of the brigade. In 1987, he was appointed commander of the 202nd Battalion of the Paratroopers Brigade.

As a battalion commander, Gershon led the battalion in Operation Law and Order in the village of Maidun in Lebanon. The battalion's mission was to capture the village, a Hezbollah stronghold, and clear it. Gershon marched at the head of the May Company when suddenly,

"a terrorist came out of a pit directly in front of me. I saw he was holding an RPG-7, and I instinctively fired two shots at him, then dropped to the ground. It was only afterward that the soldiers told me the rocket he fired flew over my head."

In another encounter in the village, the paratroopers, led by Gershon, stormed a Hezbollah position and threw a grenade inside. Afterward, they threw more grenades into another position, but the terrorist returned them. At this point, the battalion commander decided to break the lever of a phosphorus grenade to eliminate the delay time, despite the safety prohibition, and threw it into the pit. This time, the grenade didn't come back, and the fighters stormed the position, shooting. Years later, Gershon remarked in a lecture that

"without diminishing the myth of the Battle of Ammunition Hill, this was an equally tough battle, managed much more successfully."

In 1988, he was appointed deputy brigade commander.

In 1991, Gershon was appointed commander of the Hermon Brigade, and in 1993 he became commander of Hiram Formation on the Lebanon border. In July 1994, during his service in the South Lebanon Security Zone, two of his soldiers were killed and four others wounded during an operational accident when an armored personnel carrier struck a power line at the Taybeh outpost. Gershon, along with the battalion commander Moshe Tamir and company commander Ofek Buchris, was brought to trial. They were acquitted of negligent homicide but convicted of negligence in the performance of their duties. In 1995, he was appointed commander of the 55th Reserve Paratroopers Brigade, and in 1997 he was appointed commander of the Paratroopers Brigade. Gershon led the brigade in the South Lebanon conflict (1985–2000), including in Operation "Reducing Range", during which the commander of the Paratroopers Reconnaissance Unit, Eitan Belhassan, was killed. In 1999, he was appointed commander of Fire Formation, and in 2001, he became commander of the Judea and Samaria Division. As division commander, he led the division during the Second Intifada and was part of the "Lebanon Team", which believed that more force could and should have been used against the Palestinians earlier in the conflict. Gershon commanded the division during Operation Defensive Shield and led the capture of the cities of Nablus and Ramallah, and the siege of the Muqata. During Gershon's tenure as commander of the Judea and Samaria Division, over 5,000 arrests were carried out, and more than 12,000 terrorists were detained. In 2004, he went on to study at the British Royal College of Defence Studies.

In January 2005, he was promoted to Aluf and appointed commander of Home Front Command. He served in this role during the 2006 Lebanon War and was criticized by the State Comptroller for the Home Front's preparedness. According to the comptroller, "it was found that the handling of the home front during the war was severely flawed. The executive levels, including the Prime Minister, the Defense Minister, government ministers, the Chief of Staff, and the Commander of Home Front Command, each in their respective roles, failed severely in the decision-making processes, assessment, and execution regarding the treatment of the civilian population in the home front and ensuring routine life or, at the very least, providing essential services to the residents of the north during the war." Gershon petitioned the Supreme Court of Israel to delay the publication of the report's findings. After the war, he initiated the "Turning Point" exercise, a national home front exercise involving all emergency systems, government ministries, and local authorities. The exercise has been held annually since. He also pushed for the establishment of the National Emergency Management Authority (RAHEL), which replaced the outdated Civil Defense system. In December 2007, he announced his retirement from military service after 32 years, following the Chief of Staff's announcement of his replacement.

== Post-military career ==
From 2008 to 2014, Gershon was CEO of the Friends of the IDF organisation (FIDF). His salary amounted to 2.7 million dollars during this period. He is the voluntary chairman of the organization "LeHetiv", which helps families in poverty.

In 2016, he returned to the IDF Reserves and was appointed by the Chief of Staff as the Deputy Commander of the Northern Command during emergencies. In 2020, he joined the "Securityists" movement, which advocates for the annexation of the West Bank to Israel.

In 2020, Minister of Transportation Miri Regev appointed Gershon as chairman of the Israel Airports Authority. The government approved the appointment on 22 November.

== Education and personal life ==
Gershon holds a master's degree in Political Science with a minor in Middle Eastern Studies from the University of Haifa. He is a graduate of the IDF Command and Staff College, the British Royal College of Defence Studies (RCDS), and has completed a directors and senior financial management course at Tel Aviv University's Executive Program. He is married for the second time and has four children.
