= Asa Kasher =

Israeli professor, philosopher, and linguist (born 1940)

- אסא כשר
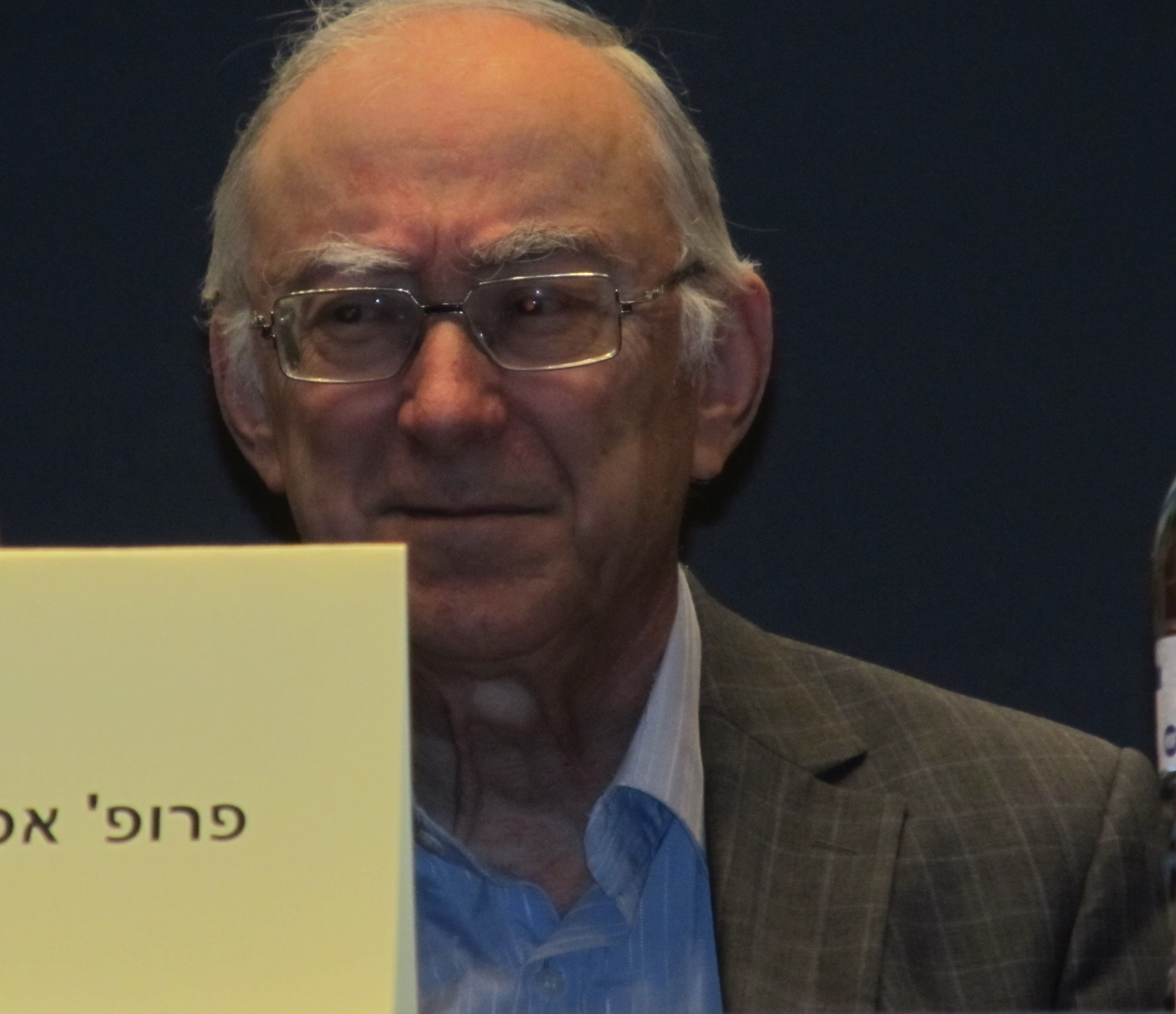
- Born: June 6, 1940 (age 86); Jerusalem, Mandatory Palestine
- Citizenship: Israeli
- Education: Ph.D. in Philosophy, 1971, Hebrew University of Jerusalem
- Occupations: Philosopher and linguist
- Employer(s): Tel Aviv University and Shalem College
- Awards: 2000 Israel Prize for philosophy

Asa Kasher (Hebrew: אסא כשר; born June 6, 1940) is an Israeli philosopher and linguist working as a Professor at Tel Aviv University. He is the lead author of the IDF Code of Ethics.

== Biography ==
Asa Kasher is the grandson of talmudist Menachem Mendel Kasher. He is noted for authorship of Israel Defense Forces's Code of Conduct, as well as his co-authorship of an amended version of the controversial Hannibal Directive in the 1990s.

Kasher has also written an influential defense of Israel's 'law of return', justifying it as a form of affirmative action, following periods in which Jews were not allowed to immigrate to many countries.

He also wrote about possible meanings to a Jewish and democratic state, the meaning of a Jewish collective and many other essays. His essays on Jewish subjects are collected in a book titled Ruach Ish (Spirit of a Man), published in Hebrew by Am Oved publication house. He is also the editor-in-chief of the philosophy journal Philosophia. Kasher has contributed as well to the fields of psychology and ethics.

== Awards and recognition ==
In 2000, Kasher was awarded the Israel Prize for philosophy.

== Criticism ==
Uri Avnery criticised Kasher for arguing in favour of targeted killing by the IDF, in those cases in which it knowingly fires on targets where civilians are present or nearby if enemy forces are also known to be present. Avnery writes that "Kasher states explicitly that it is justified to kill a Palestinian child who is in the company of a hundred 'terrorists', because the 'terrorists' might kill children in Sderot. But in reality, it was a case of killing a hundred children who were in the company of one 'terrorist'."

Kasher was also criticized in his role as Editor-in-Chief of the philosophy journal Philosophia, which published and later retracted an article by Kevin MacDonald, titled "The 'Default Hypothesis' Fails to Explain Jewish Influence". The article was criticized as promoting anti-semitic tropes, and questions were raised about the peer review process for the paper, particularly after one of the paper's referees announced himself on twitter and he appeared to lack the requisite qualifications to referee papers for the journal. Springer Publishing undertook an investigation and retracted the paper. Kasher eventually resigned as editor of Philosophia.

== See also ==
- List of Israel Prize recipients
