= Moshe Tamir (general) =

Israeli brigadier general (born 1964)

- משה תמיר
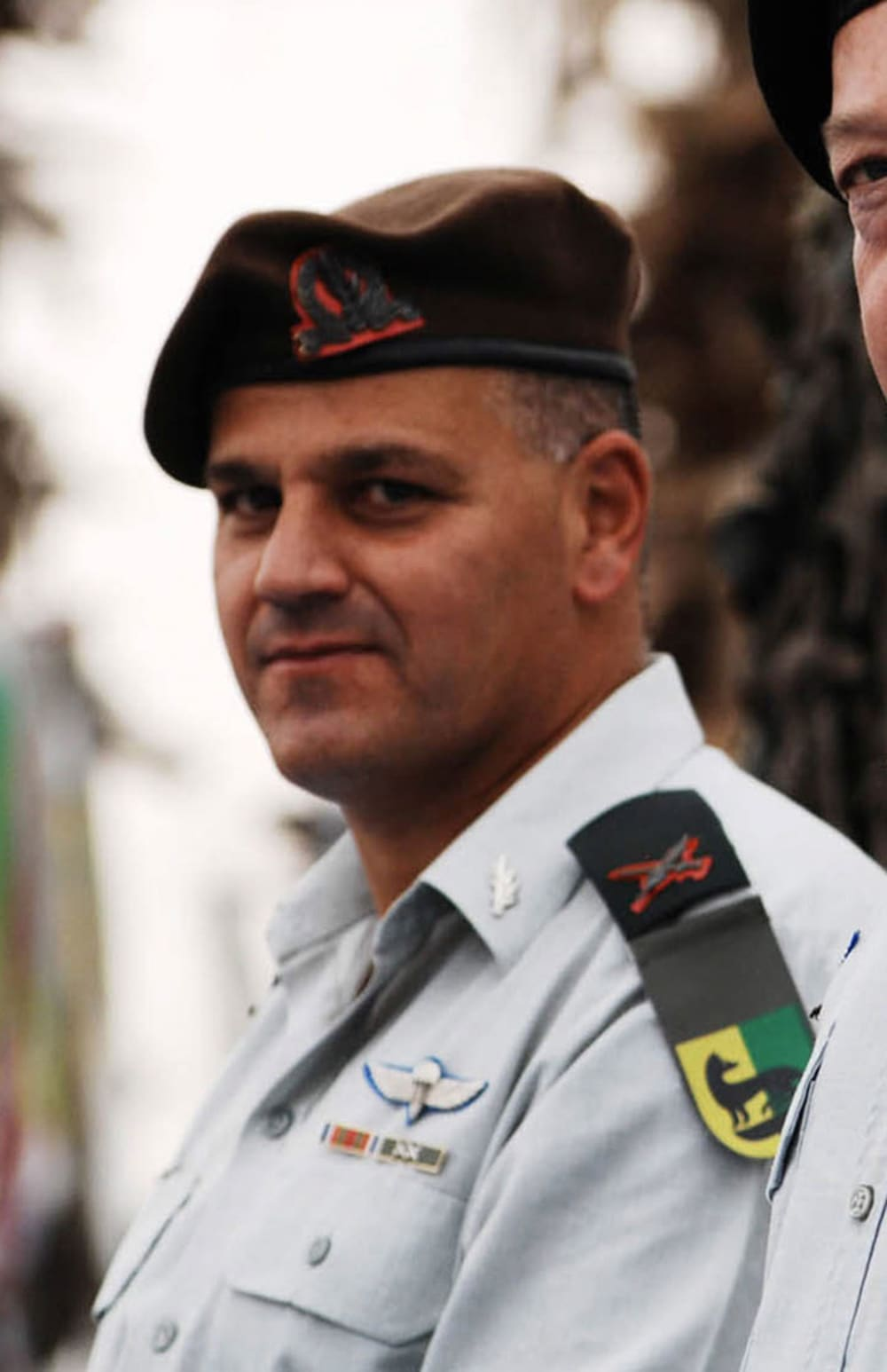
- Born: Israel
- Military career
- Allegiance: Israel
- Branch: Israel Defense Forces
- Service years: 1982-2010
- Rank: Tat aluf (Brigadier general)
- Nickname: Chico
- Unit: Golani Brigade
- Commands: Golani Brigade's 12 battalion, Regional Brigade in South Lebanon, Golani Brigade, Gaza Division
- Conflicts: First Lebanon War; South Lebanon conflict (1985–2000); First Intifada; Second Intifada; Operation Defensive Shield; 2006 Lebanon War; Operation Cast Lead; Operation Pillar of Defense; Operation Protective Edge
- Awards: Head of Regional Command (Aluf) Citation

Moshe "Chiko" Tamir (Hebrew: משה "צ'יקו" תמיר; born 1964) is an Israeli brigadier general who commanded the Gaza Division of the Israel Defense Forces.

== Military service ==
Tamir was drafted into the IDF in 1982 and did his military service in the Golani Brigade, of which he became commander in 2001–2003. He served as a soldier, a squad leader in the brigade's 13th Battalion.

In 1984 he became an infantry officer after finishing the officer candidates' school, and returned to the Golani Brigade. Tamir led the Brigade's reconnaissance company, the 12th Battalion and Egoz Unit in counter-guerrilla operations in South Lebanon. For his actions as the commander of Egoz Unit, Tamir received the Head of Regional Command (Aluf) Citation. Afterwards he commanded a regional brigade in South Lebanon. Tamir commanded the Golani Brigade during the Second Intifada, including during Operation Defensive Shield. Later on he commanded the Gaza Division.

Tamir was forced to resign from the IDF because of an incident in which he tried to cover up an accident involving his young son joyriding in a military all-terrain vehicle. He was court-martialed and subsequently honorably discharged.
