= President of the Supreme Court of Israel =

Head of the highest court in Israel

President of Supreme Court of Israel
- נשיא בית המשפט העליון
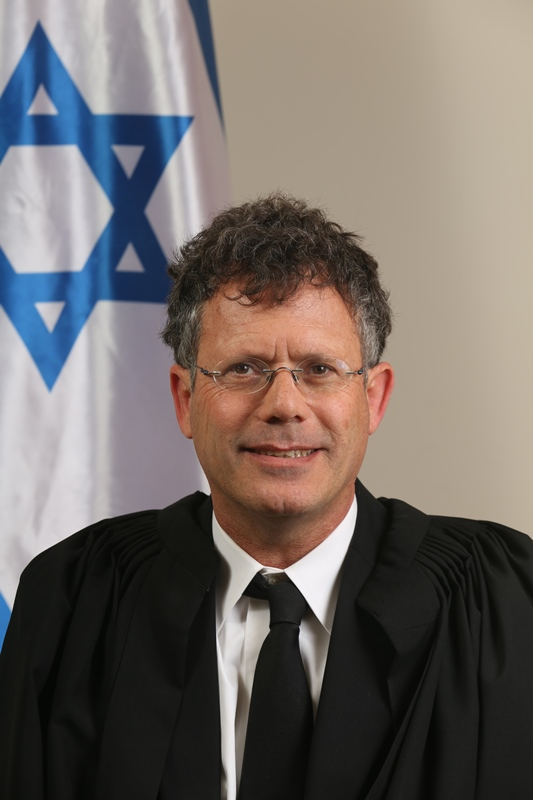
- Incumbent; Yitzhak Amit since 13 February 2025
- Precursor: Uzi Fogelman (acting)

The president of the Supreme Court of Israel is one of the judges of the Supreme Court of Israel, who serves as head of the body, and as result has a significant impact on the judiciary system in Israel.

The previous president, Esther Hayut, retired on 15 October 2023. As a successor was not selected, Deputy President Yitzhak Amit served as acting President of the Supreme Court. He was selected by the Judicial Selection Committee as president of the Supreme Court in January 2025.

== Selection Process ==
In accordance with section 4(a) of the Basic Law: The Judiciary, the president of the Supreme Court is appointed by the president of Israel, according to the selection of the Judicial Selection Committee. Per law, the president of Israel does not have independent legal authority in this area, but rather he is obliged to follow the decision made by the committee. By convention, the selection is made in order of seniority, by which the longest-serving judge is designated when the outgoing president completes his or her term. Accordingly, judges appointed at a young age have a relatively higher likelihood of eventually serving as president. Several justice ministers, including Haim Ramon, Daniel Friedmann, Ayelet Shaked, and Yariv Levin have attempted to end the seniority discipline but the practice has remained unchanged.

The length of tenure as a judge in Israel is limited: section 13 of the Courts Law mandates that a judge's term concludes at the mandatory retirement age of 70. In an amendment to the courts law, approved in 2007, it was determined that the tenure of a Supreme Court president is seven years from the date of appointment, with no possibility of reappointment.

Also in the amendment to the Courts Law approved in July 2007, passed at the initiative of Justice Minister Daniel Friedmann, it was enacted that a Supreme Court president should not be appointed within three years of retirement age. However, in January 2012, the Knesset amended the law and annulled that limitation, at the initiative of MK Ya'akov Katz. The decision was known as the "Grunis Law," as it made possible for the appointment of Asher Grunis to Supreme Court president soon after its passage.

== Powers ==
The Courts Law of 1984 designates the following unique powers to the President of the Supreme Court:

1. Various appointments of judges, such as appointment of a judge to preside in a higher position, are taken under the authority of the Justice Minister, but with the approval of the President of the Supreme Court. In some other cases it is also required for the minister to consult with the president of the court.
2. The President of the Supreme Court determines the size and composition of the Disciplinary Tribunal of Judges.
3. The Supreme Court typically hears cases as a panel of three judges, however, at the discretion of the President in specific cases the court may sit as a panel of a larger uneven number of Judges.
4. The judge or judges presiding over a specific matter brought to the court are determined by the President of the Supreme Court.
5. The President of the Supreme Court can disqualify a judge from ruling on a particular case, if the president believes there may exist a conflict of interest.

Other powers were established in the Basic Law: The Judiciary:

- The President of the Supreme Court serves as one of the members of Israel's Judicial Selection Committee.
- The President of the Supreme Court and the Chair of the Judicial Selection Committee can initiate proceedings to remove a judge from the court.
- The permanent transfer of a judge from one court to another requires the approval of the President of the Supreme Court or the Disciplinary Tribunal of Judges.
- The activities of a judge in outside employment or in a public role are permitted only by law or with the approval of the President of the Supreme Court and the Justice Minister.
- If a judge is the subject of a complaint before the Disciplinary Tribunal of Judges, or the under criminal investigation or a criminal charge, the President of the Supreme Court may suspend the judge for a length of time at his or her discretion.

In accordance with the Commissions of Inquiry Law of 1968, after the decision is made to form a State Commission of Inquiry, the President of the Supreme Court determines its composition.

== List of presidents ==
No.	Name	Dates of term		Length of service
No.	Name	Start date	End date	Length of service
1	Moshe Smoira (1948–1954)	14 September 1948	1 August 1954 (Retired)	5 years, 321 days
2	Yitzhak Olshan (1954–1965)	1 August 1954	19 February 1965	10 years, 202 days
3	Shimon Agranat (1965–1976)	18 March 1965	5 September 1976	11 years, 171 days
4	Yoel Zussman (1976–1980)	8 September 1976	29 February 1980 (Retired)	3 years, 174 days
5	Moshe Landau (1980–1982)	5 March 1980	29 April 1982	2 years, 55 days
6	Yitzhak Kahan (1982–1983)	30 April 1982	15 November 1983	1 year, 199 days
7	Meir Shamgar (1983–1995)	27 November 1983	13 August 1995	11 years, 259 days
8	Aharon Barak (1995–2006)	13 August 1995	16 September 2006	11 years, 34 days
9	Dorit Beinisch (2006–2012)	17 September 2006	28 February 2012	5 years, 164 days
10	Asher Grunis (2012–2015)	28 February 2012	17 January 2015	2 years, 323 days
11	Miriam Naor (2015–2017)	17 January 2015	26 October 2017	2 years, 282 days
12	Esther Hayut (2017–2023)	26 October 2017	16 October 2023	5 years, 355 days
13	Yitzhak Amit	13 February 2025		1 year, 258 days

In accordance with the seniority rule, the next Supreme Court presidents are expected to be:

#	Judge	Start of Term	End of Term
14	Noam Sohlberg	20 October 2028	22 January 2032
15	Daphne Barak-Erez	22 January 2032	2 January 2035
16	Ofer Grosskopf	2 January 2035	12 October 2039

== Deputy president ==
In 1953, President of the Supreme Court Moshe Smoira fell ill, and Justice Minister Pinchas Rosen initiated the position of a permanent Acting President of the Supreme Court who could step in should Judge Smoira's condition prevent him from discharging his duties. Indeed, in December 1953, when Smoira ceased working, Yitzhak Olshan was appointed the first Acting President by the Selection Committee.

In 1984, at the initiative of Meir Shamgar, who had been appointed a judge a year earlier, the Judges Law was amended and the title "Permanent Acting President of the Supreme Court" was replaced by "Deputy President of the Supreme Court." The first person to hold the new title was Miriam Ben-Porat.

The Deputy President of the Supreme Court is subject to similar restrictions to those that fall on the appointment of the President of the Supreme Court: the term ends at the mandatory retirement age of 70; and in accordance with Amendment 45 to the Courts Law in 2007, the length of term as Deputy President is seven years without possibility of reappointment.

While the position of President of the Supreme Court is vacant and until the new president begins to serve, or if the President is out of the country, or if the President is temporarily incapacitated from fulfilling his or her duty, the Deputy President carries out the functions of the President.

The President of the Supreme Court is permitted to delegate his or her responsibilities to the Deputy President.

=== List of Deputy Presidents and Acting Presidents of the Supreme Court ===
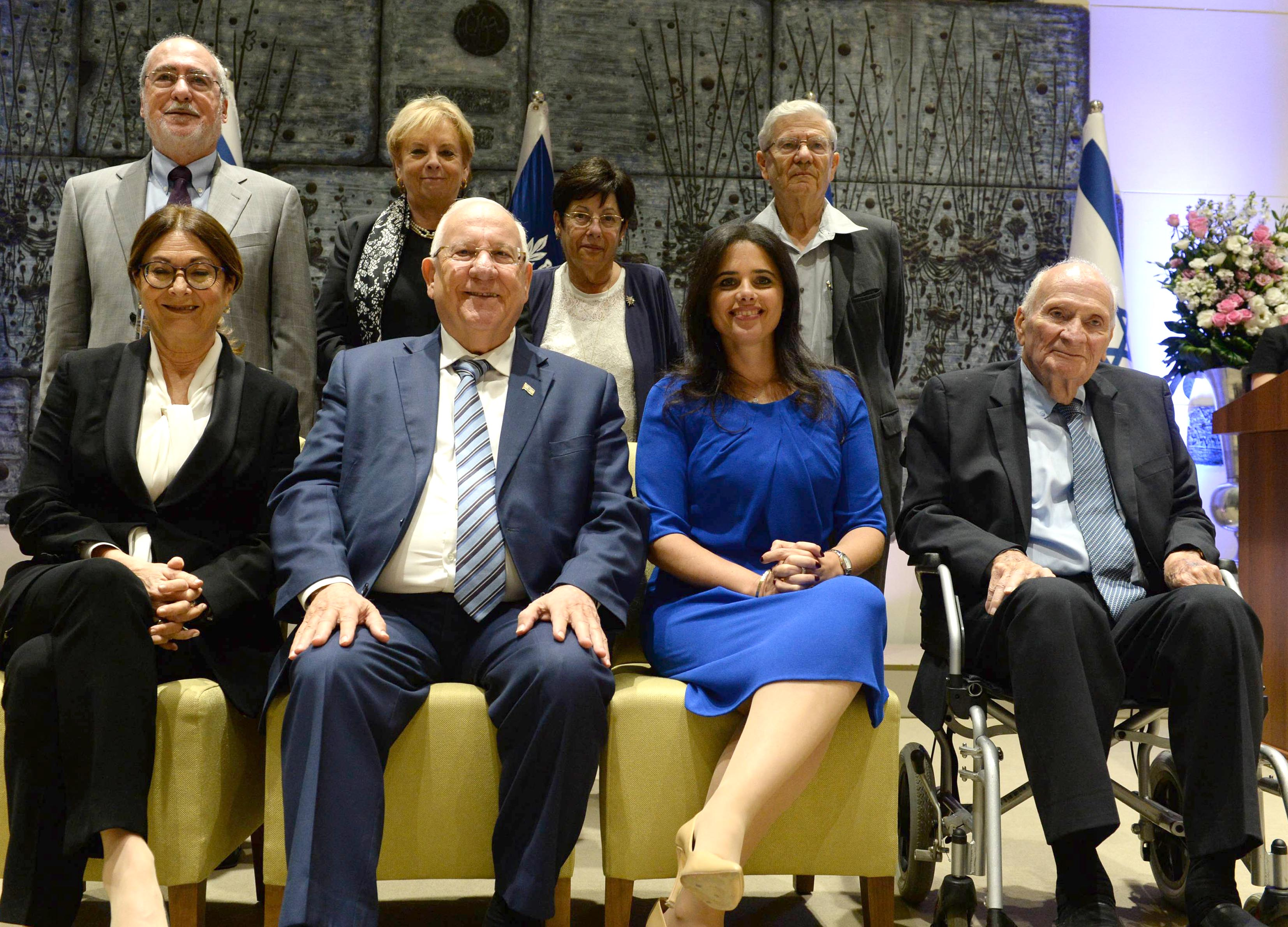
President of Israel Reuven Rivlin swears in President of the Supreme Court Esther Hayut. Seated, left-right: Esther Hayut, Reuven Rivlin, Justice Minister Ayelet Shaked, and retired president Meir Shamgar. Standing, left-right, past presidents Asher Gronus, Dorit Beinisch, Miriam Naor, and Aharon Barak

#	Name	Start of term	End of term	Presidents served under
1	Yitzhak Olshan	11 December 1953	1 August 1954 (Became president)	Moshe Smoira
2	Shneur Zalman Cheshin	1 August 1954	29 December 1959 (Died in office)	Yitzhak Olshan
3	Shimon Agranat	29 February 1960	18 March 1965 (Became president)	Yitzhak Olshan
4	Moshe Zilberg	18 March 1965	16 September 1970	Shimon Agranat
5	Yoel Zussman	7 October 1970	8 September 1976 (Became president)	Shimon Agranat
6	Moshe Landau	14 September 1976	5 March 1980 (Became president)	Yoel Zussman
7	Haim Cohen	5 March 1980	11 March 1981	Moshe Landau
8	Yitzhak Kahan	26 March 1981	30 April 1982 (Became president)	Moshe Landau
9	Meir Shamgar	30 April 1982	27 November 1983 (Became president)	Yitzhak Kahan
10	Miriam Ben-Porat	28 November 1983	25 April 1988	Meir Shamgar
11	Menachem Elon	26 April 1988	1 November 1993	Meir Shamgar
12	Aharon Barak	1 November 1993	12 August 1995 (Became president)	Meir Shamgar
13	Shlomo Levin	13 August 1995	20 February 2003	Aharon Barak
14	Theodor Or	20 February 2003	18 March 2004	Aharon Barak
15	Eliyahu Matza	23 April 2004	4 January 2005	Aharon Barak
16	Mishael Cheshin	4 January 2005	16 February 2006	Aharon Barak
17	Eliezer Rivlin	17 September 2006	28 May 2012	Dorit Beinisch, Asher Grunis
18	Miriam Naor	31 May 2012	15 January 2015 (Became president)	Asher Grunis
19	Elyakim Rubinstein	15 January 2015	13 June 2017	Miriam Naor
20	Salim Joubran	12 June 2017	4 August 2017	Miriam Naor
21	Hanan Melcer	30 October 2017	12 April 2021	Esther Hayut
22	Neal Hendel	18 August 2021	27 April 2022	Esther Hayut
23	Uzi Vogelman	9 May 2022	1 October 2024	Esther Hayut
24	Noam Sohlberg	10 April 2025	Present	Yitzhak Amit

After the retirement of Judge Salim Joubran on 4 August 2017, there was no judge serving as Deputy President until the appointment of Hanan Melcer on 30 October 2017. In accordance with the seniority rule, it was expected for Esther Hayut to be appointed Deputy President on 4 August 2017 (after Judge Joubran's retirement), but she declined and on 5 September she presented her candidacy for president as did Melcer for Deputy President.

The following table presents the judges expected to serve as Deputy President of the Supreme Court:

#	Judge	Start of Term	End of Term
25	Daphne Barak-Erez	22 January 2032	2 January 2035
26	Ofer Grosskopf	2 January 2035	12 October 2039

== See also ==
- Judiciary of Israel
- Judicial Selection Committee (Israel)
- Supreme Court of Israel
- Basic Laws of Israel
