= Gila Canfy-Steinitz =

Israeli jurist (born 1962)

- גילה כנפי-שטייניץ
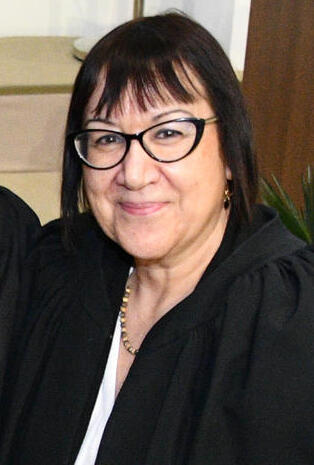
- Gila Canfy-Steinitz

Justice of the Supreme Court of Israel
- Incumbent
- Assumed office 3 March 2022

Personal details
- Education: Hebrew University of Jerusalem (LLB)

Gila Canfy-Steinitz (also spelled Kanfi-Steinitz; Hebrew: גילה כנפי-שטייניץ; born 1958) is an Israeli jurist who has served as a justice of the Supreme Court of Israel since 2022. She has been described as a conservative and as a moderate conservative. Canfy-Steinitz is the Supreme Court’s first female Mizrahi justice.

== Early life and education ==
Canfy-Steinitz was born in Israel in 1962. She served in the Israeli Defense Forces (IDF) from 1977 to 1979. In 1983, she completed her law studies at the Hebrew University of Jerusalem and was admitted to the Israeli Bar a year later.

== Legal career ==
From 1982 to 1983, Canfy-Steinitz interned at the Jerusalem District Court and at a law firm. From 1984 to 1992, she was an associate attorney.

In September 1993, Canfy-Steinitz was appointed Judge of the Jerusalem Magistrate's Court, a position she held until November 2005, when she was appointed Registrar and Acting Judge of the Jerusalem District Court.

In May 2006, Canfy-Steinitz was appointed to serve in the Jerusalem District Court. She was appointed Vice President of the court in March 2016.

=== Supreme Court ===
In February 2022, the Judicial Appointments Committee appointed Canfy-Steinitz as a justice on the Supreme Court. She was backed by Justice Minister Gideon Sa’ar as well as Supreme Court President Esther Hayut and justices Yitzhak Amit and Uzi Vogelman. She was sworn into office on 3 March 2022.

== Personal life ==
Canfy-Steinitz is married to former Likud MK Yuval Steinitz.
