= Israeli system of government =

- Formation: 14 May 1948; 78 years ago
- Country: State of Israel
- Head of state: President (Isaac Herzog)
- Responsible to: Knesset

Judiciary
- Court: Supreme Court
- Chief judge: Chief Justice (Yitzhak Amit)

Political system of Israel

The Israeli system of government is based on parliamentary democracy. The prime minister of Israel is the head of government and leader of a multi-party system. Executive power is exercised by the government . Legislative power is vested in the Knesset. The Judiciary is independent of the executive and the legislature. The political system of the State of Israel and its main principles are set out in 11 Basic Laws. Israel does not have a written constitution.

== Presidency ==
The president of the State is the de jure head of state of Israel. The position is largely an apolitical and ceremonial role, and is not considered a part of any Government Branch. The president's ceremonial roles include signing every law (except those pertaining to the president's powers) and international or bilateral treaty, ceremonially appointing the prime minister, confirming and endorsing the credentials of ambassadors, and receiving the credentials of foreign diplomats. The president also has several important functions in government. The president is the only government official with the power to pardon or commute prisoners. The president appoints the governor of the Bank of Israel, the president of the national emergency relief service Magen David Adom, and the members and leaders of several institutions. The president also ceremonially appoints judges to their posts after their selection.

== Executive branch ==
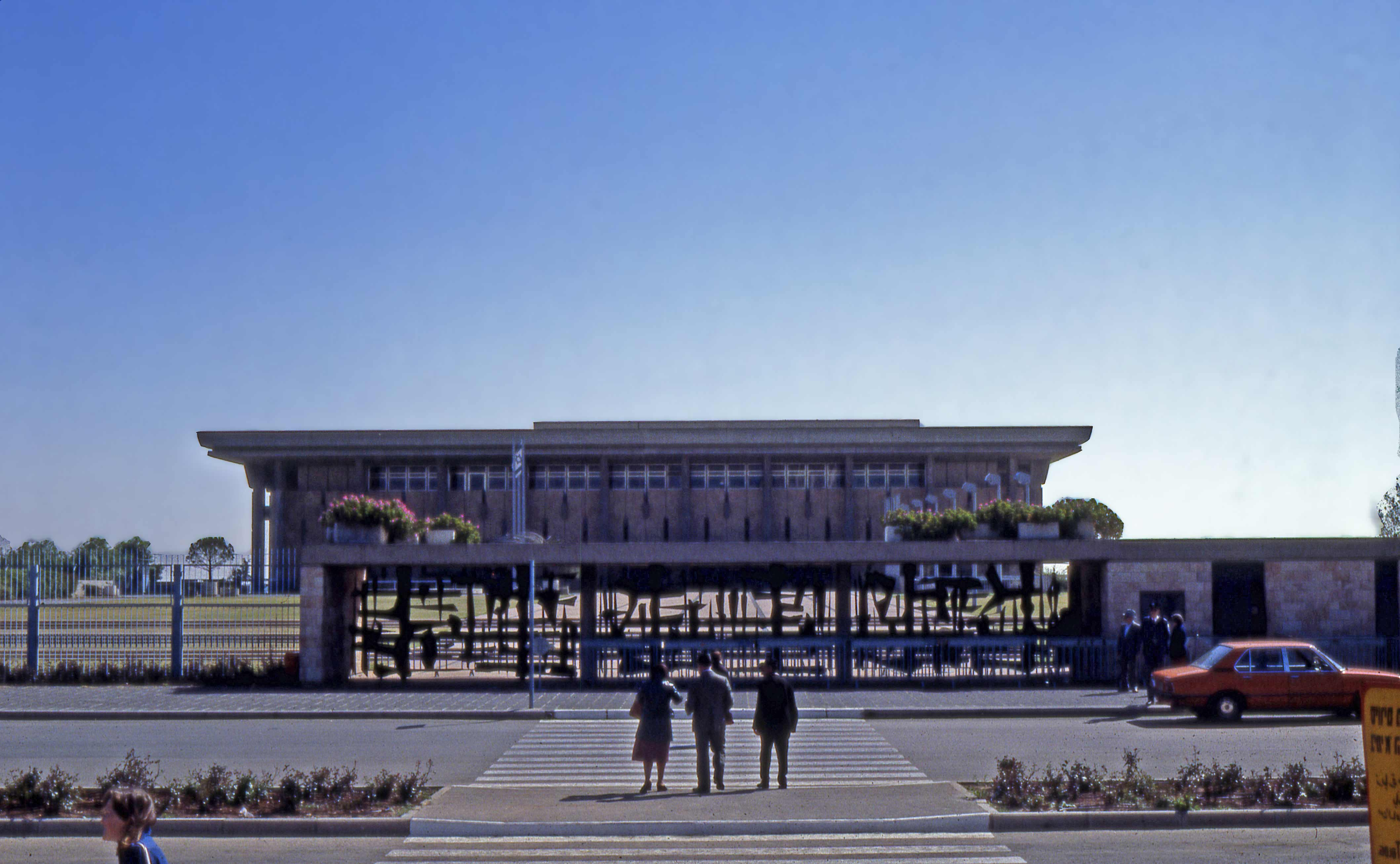
Israeli Knesset, Jerusalem

The prime minister is the most powerful political figure in the country. Under sections 7 to 14 of Basic Law: The Government, the prime minister is nominated by the president after consulting party leaders in the Knesset; the appointment of the prime minister and cabinet is in turn confirmed by a majority vote of confidence from the assembled Knesset members. As head of government, the prime minister makes foreign and domestic policy decisions which are voted on by the cabinet. The cabinet is composed of ministers, most of whom are the heads of government departments, though some are deputy ministers and ministers without portfolio. Cabinet ministers are appointed by the prime minister. The cabinet's composition must also be approved by the Knesset. The prime minister may dismiss cabinet members, but any replacements must be approved by the Knesset. Most ministers are members of the Knesset, though only the prime minister is required to be one. The cabinet meets weekly on Sundays, and there may be additional meetings if circumstances require it. Each cabinet meeting is chaired by the prime minister.

A select group of ministers led by the prime minister forms the security cabinet, responsible for outlining and implementing a foreign and defense policy. This forum is designed to coordinate diplomatic negotiations, and to make quick and effective decisions in times of crisis and war.

The Israeli government has 28 ministries, each of them responsible for a sector of public administration. Many ministries are located in the Kiryat Ben Gurion Government complex in the area of Givat Ram in Jerusalem. Each ministry is led by a minister, who is also a member of the cabinet and is usually a member of the Knesset. The Office of the Prime Minister coordinates the work of all government ministries, and assists the prime minister in their daily tasks.

The State Comptroller, who supervises and reviews the policies and operations of the government, is elected by the Knesset in secret ballot. They can only be removed from office by a two-thirds vote in the Knesset. In addition to their fiscal and operational oversight function, the State Comptroller also serves as a national ombudsman for the state, receiving complaints from the public about the actions of public officials and institutions.

== Legislative branch ==
=== Knesset ===
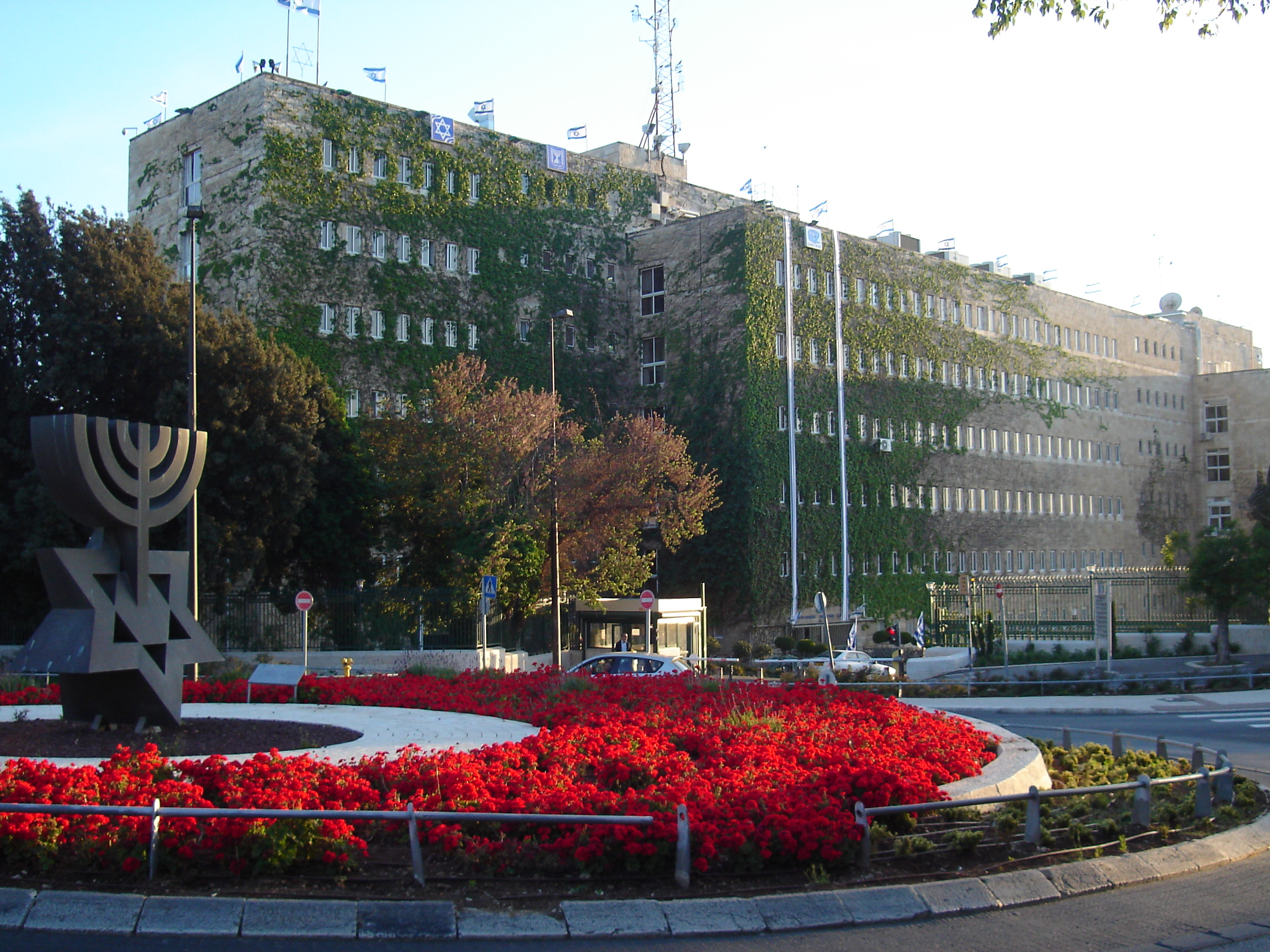
Israeli Ministry of Finance, Jerusalem

The Knesset is Israel's unicameral legislature and is seated in Jerusalem. Its 120 members are elected to 4-year terms through party-list proportional representation (see electoral system, below), as mandated by the 1958 Basic Law: The Knesset. Knesset seats are allocated among parties using the D'Hondt method of party list proportional representation. Parties select candidates using a closed list. Thus, voters select the party of their choice, rather than any specific candidate. Israel requires a party to meet an election threshold of 3.25% to be allocated a Knesset seat. All Israeli citizens 18 years of age and older may participate in legislative elections, which are conducted by secret ballot.

As the legislative branch of the Israeli government, the Knesset has the power to enact and repeal all laws. It enjoys de jure parliamentary supremacy, and can pass any law by a simple majority, even one that might arguably conflict with a Basic Law, unless it has specific conditions for its modification. The Knesset can adopt and amend Basic Laws acting through its capacity as a Constituent Assembly. The Knesset also supervises government activities through its committees, nominates the prime minister and approves the cabinet, and elects the President of the State and the State Comptroller. It also has the power to remove the President and State Comptroller from office, revoke the immunity of its members, and to dissolve itself and call new elections.

The February 2009 elections produced five prominent political parties; Kadima, Likud, Israel Beytenu, Labor and Shas, each with more than ten seats in the Knesset. Three of these parties were ruling parties in the past. However, only once has a single party held the 61 seats needed for a majority government (the Alignment from 1968 until the 1969 elections). Therefore, aside from that one exception, since 1948 Israeli governments have always comprised coalitions. As of 2009, there are 12 political parties represented in the Knesset, spanning both the political and religious spectra.

=== Electoral system ===
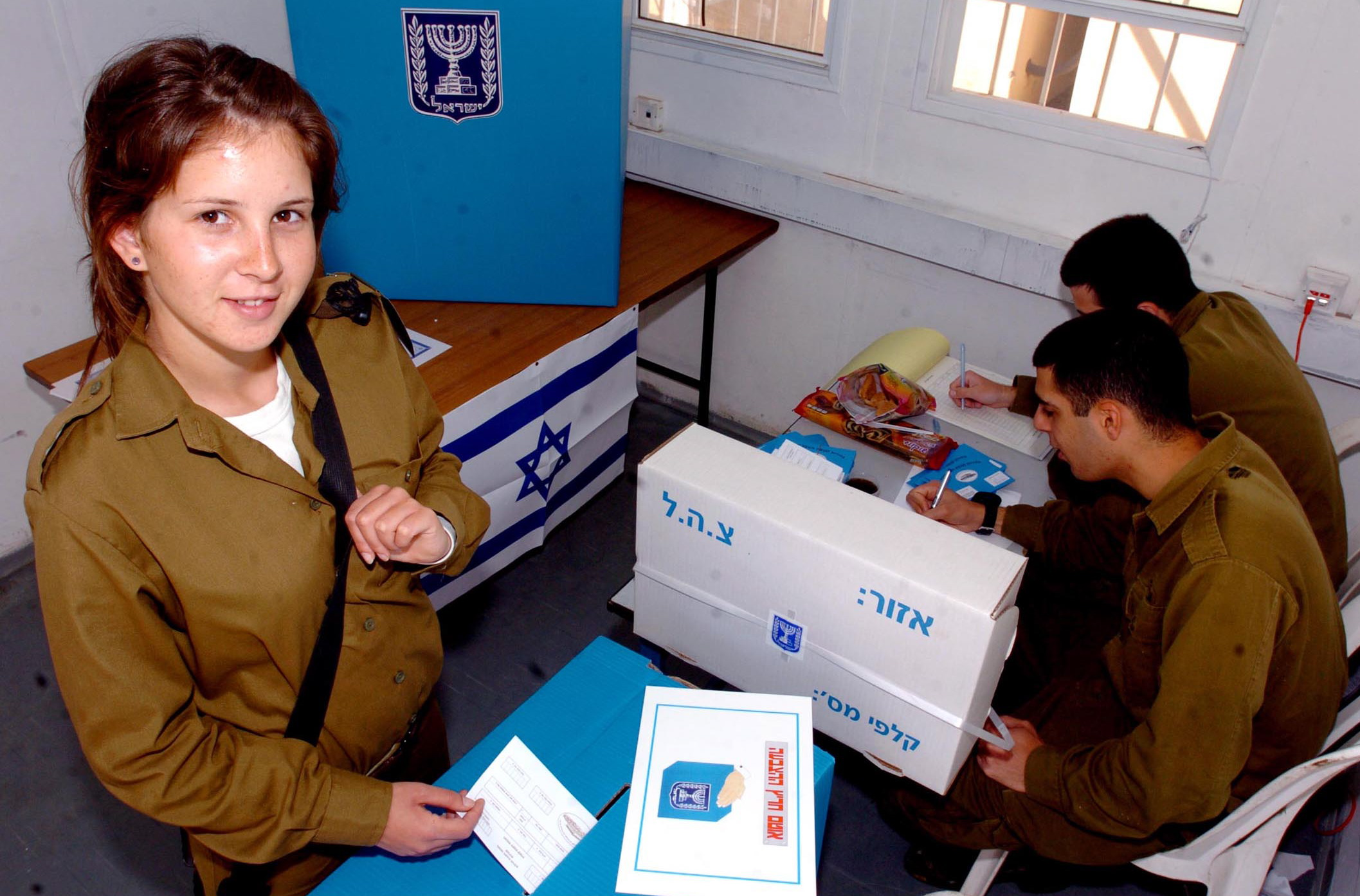
IDF soldier at voting booth

Israel's electoral system operates within the parameters of a Basic Law (The Knesset) and of the 1969 Knesset Elections Law.

The Knesset's 120 members are elected by secret ballot to 4-year terms, although the Knesset may decide to call for new elections before the end of the 4-year term, and a government can change without a general election; between the 1988 and the 2026 elections, no Knesset finished its 4-year term. In addition a motion of no confidence may be called. Voting in general elections takes place using the highest averages method of party-list proportional representation, using the d'Hondt formula.

General elections use closed lists: voters vote only for party lists and cannot affect the order of candidates within the lists. Since the 1992 Parties Law, only registered parties may stand. There are no separate electoral districts; all voters vote on the same party lists. Suffrage is universal among Israeli citizens aged 18 years or older. Voting is optional. Polling locations are open throughout Israel; absentee ballots are limited to diplomatic staff and the merchant marine. While each party attains one seat for 1 in 120 votes, there is a minimum threshold of 3.25% for parties to attain their first seat in an election. This requirement aimed to bar smaller parties from parliament but spurred some parties to join simply to overcome the threshold. The low vote-threshold for entry into parliament, as well as the need for parties with small numbers of seats to form coalition governments, results in a highly fragmented political spectrum, with small parties exercising extensive power (relative to their electoral support) within coalitions.

The president selects the prime minister as the party leader most able to form a government, based on the number of parliament seats their coalition has won. After the president's selection, the prime minister has forty-five days to form a government. The Knesset collectively must approve the members of the cabinet. This electoral system, inherited from the Yishuv (Jewish settlement organization during the British Mandate), makes it very difficult for any party to gain a working majority in the Knesset and thus governments generally form on the basis of coalitions. Due to the difficulties in holding coalitions together, elections often occur earlier than scheduled. The average life-span of an Israeli government is about two years. Over the years, the peace process, the role of religion in the state, and political scandals have caused coalitions to break apart or have produced early elections.

== Judicial system ==
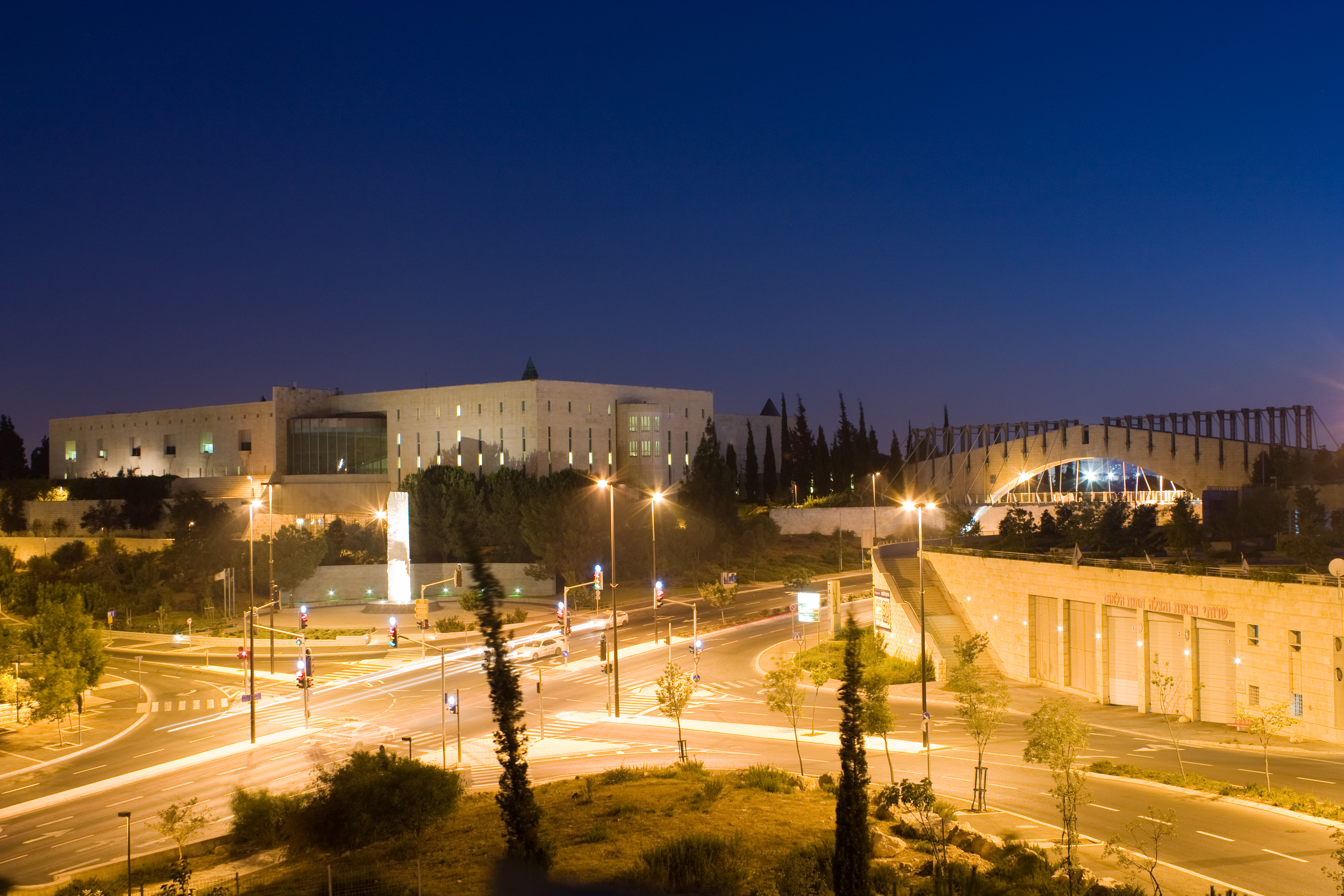
Israeli Supreme Court and High Court of Justice, Jerusalem

The judicial branch is an independent branch of the government, including secular and religious courts for the various religions present in Israel. The court system involves three stages of justice.

Judges for all courts are appointed by the Judicial Selection Committee. The committee is composed of nine members: two cabinet members (one being the Minister of Justice), two Knesset members, two members of the Israel Bar Association, and three Supreme Court justices (one being the president of the Supreme Court). The committee is chaired by the Minister of Justice.

In November 1985, the Israeli government informed the United Nations Secretariat that it would no longer accept compulsory International Court of Justice jurisdiction.

=== Judicial courts ===
Israeli judicial courts consist of a three-tier system:

- Magistrate Courts serve as the court of first instance
- District Courts serve as the appellate courts and the court of first instance for some cases;
- The Supreme Court acts as both a court of first instance in matters concerning the legality of decisions of state authorities, and as a supreme appellate court.

=== Religious courts ===
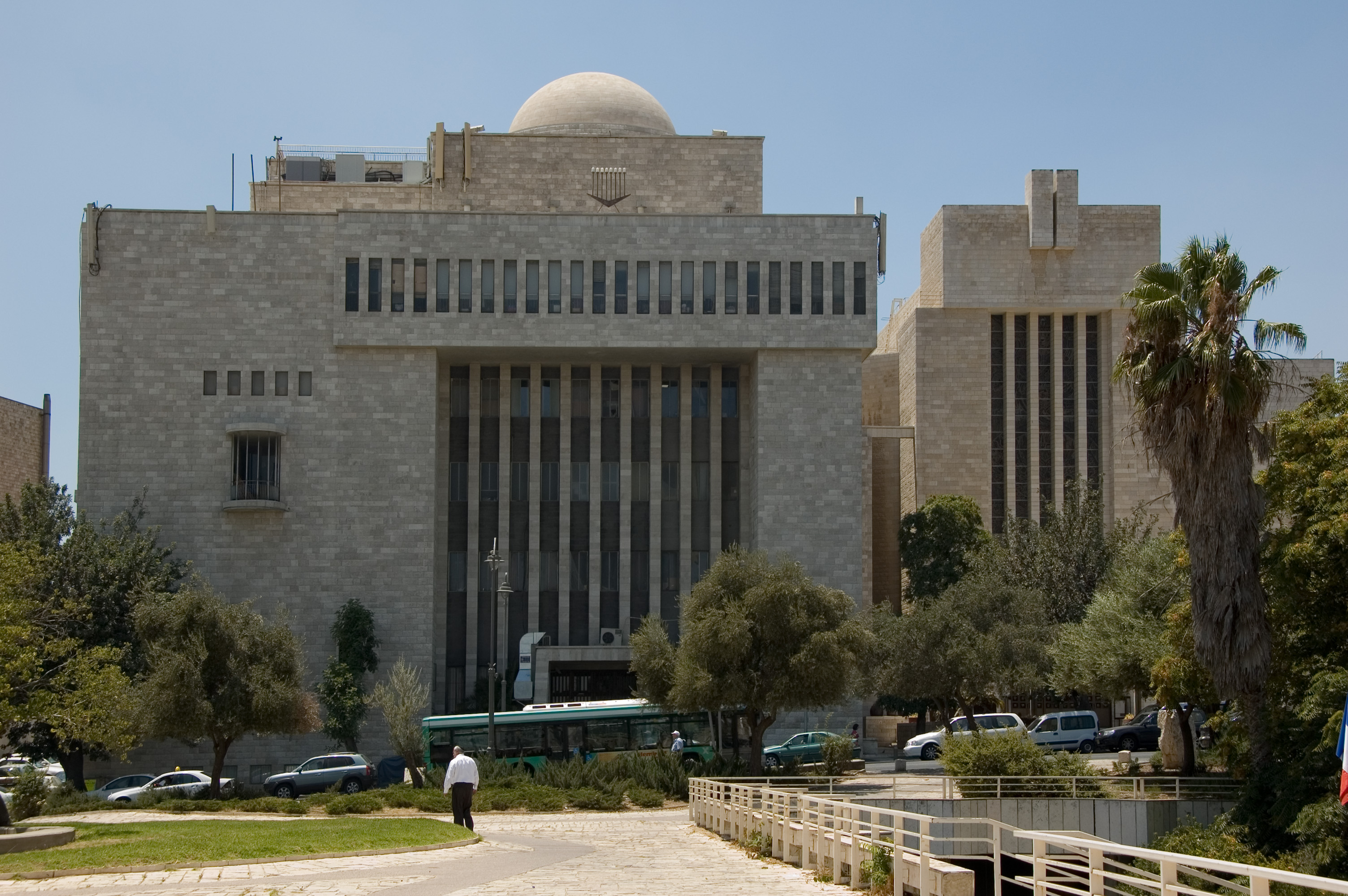
Jerusalem Great Synagogue, seat of Chief Rabbinate

Some issues of family law (marriage and divorce in particular) fall either under the jurisdiction of religious courts or under parallel jurisdiction of those and the state's family courts. The state maintains and finances Rabbinical, Sharia and various Canonical courts for the needs of the various religious communities. All judges are civil servants, and required to uphold general law in their tribunals as well. The Supreme Court serves as final appellate instance for all religious courts.

Jewish religious courts are under control of the Prime Minister's Office and the Chief Rabbinate of Israel. These courts have jurisdiction in only five areas: Kashrut, Sabbath, Jewish burial, marital issues (especially divorce), and Jewish status of immigrants. However, except for determining a person's marital status, all other marital issues may also be taken to secular Family Courts.

The other major religious communities in Israel, such as Muslims and Christians, have their own religious courts. These courts have similar jurisdiction over their followers as Jewish religious courts, although Muslim religious courts have more control over family affairs.

=== Labor courts ===
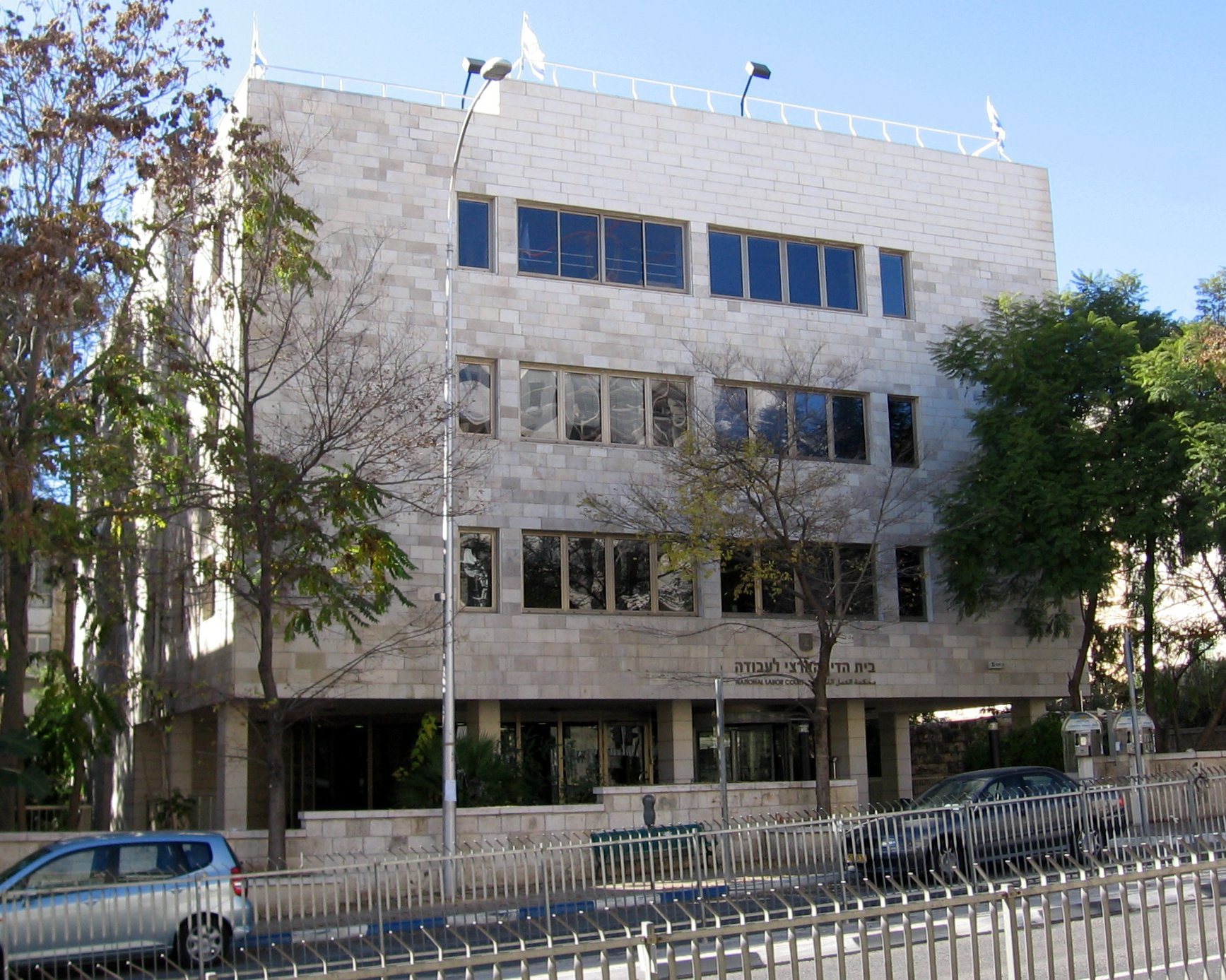
Israel National Labor Court, Jerusalem

There are five regional labor courts in Israel as a tribunal of first instance, and a National Labor Court in Jerusalem to hear appeals and few cases of national importance. The labor courts have exclusive jurisdiction over cases involving employer-employee relationship, employment, strikes and labor union disputes, labor-related complaints against the National Insurance Institute, and Health Insurance claims.

=== Military courts ===
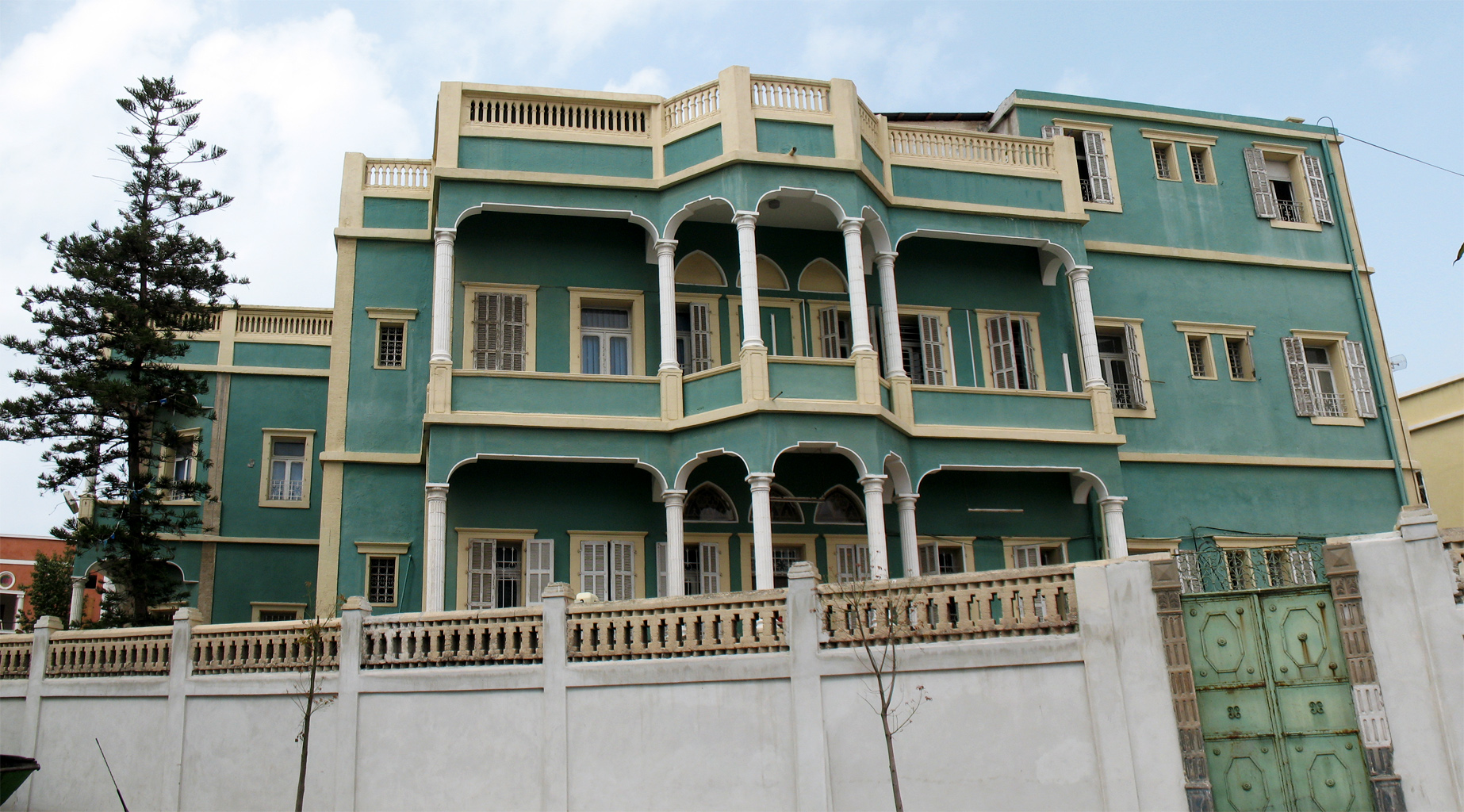
Israel Military Court, Jaffa

The Israel Defense Forces (IDF) maintains a series of district military courts and special military tribunals. The Military Court of Appeals is the IDF's supreme appellate court. It considers and judges over appeals submitted by the Military Advocate General, which challenges decisions rendered by the lower courts.

=== Court of Admiralty ===
In all matters having to do with admiralty, commercial shipping, accidents at sea, and other maritime matters, the Haifa District Court, sitting as the Court of Admiralty, has exclusive statewide jurisdiction.

== Separation of powers ==
The Basic Law: The Government contains a number of checks and balances between the Knesset and the Government.

The fact that the Government holds office by virtue of the confidence of the Knesset creates a significant check on the Government's power, but there are also restrictions on the Knesset's ability to vote no confidence in the Government. The Government serves with the confidence of the Knesset, but the Knesset is limited to a constructive vote of no confidence under Basic Law: The Government (2001). Members of the Knesset are also disincentivized from supporting a vote of no confidence for the purpose of obtaining a ministerial portfolio in a subsequent government, as when members of Knesset (MKs) defect from their faction—which is defined as opposing one's party's position on a vote of confidence—they are ineligible to serve as ministers during that Knesset, and they cannot run on their party's list in the subsequent election.

Additionally, the Knesset can exercise oversight over the Government. Knesset committees can compel testimony of government ministers, and the Government is required to comply with such oversight requests. The Basic Laws also reserve a role for the Knesset minority, with 40 MKs empowered to compel the Prime Minister's attendance in the Knesset on a set topic. The Basic Laws contemplate a regularized system of oversight, with any reorganization of ministerial powers requiring Knesset approval and the creation of a committee in the Knesset to oversee the ministry. This requirement supports the Knesset's oversight of ministerial regulations. When government ministers issue regulations that involve criminal sanctions for violations, the Knesset committee that oversees that committee has the ability to invalidate that regulation within 45 days. The Israeli Supreme Court has emphasized the importance of such oversight mechanisms, in some cases requiring the government avoid taking action, including during a state of emergency, unless and until the Knesset can properly exercise oversight of it through its committees.

== Local government ==
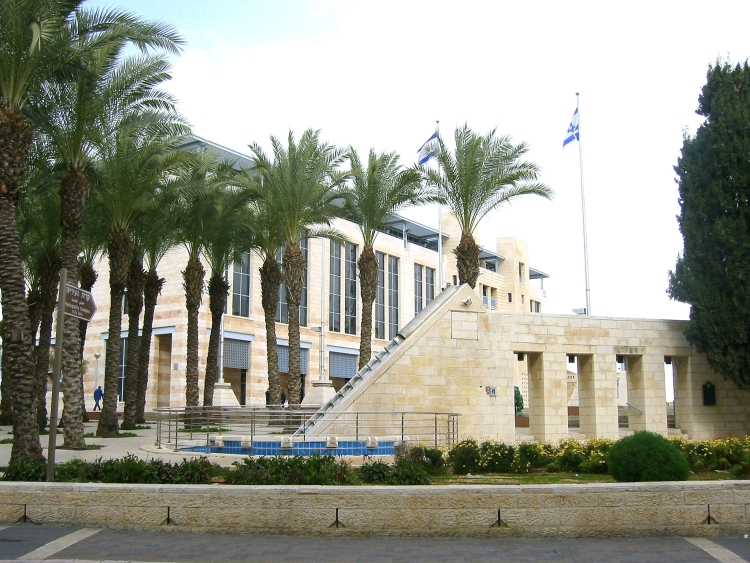
Jerusalem Municipality, Kikar Safra, Jerusalem

For governmental purposes, Israel is divided into six districts: Central District; Haifa District; Jerusalem District; Northern District; Southern District; and Tel Aviv District. The districts further subdivide into fifteen sub-districts and into fifty natural regions. Administration of the districts is coordinated by the Ministry of Interior.

There are three forms of local government in Israel: city councils, local councils, and regional councils. City councils govern municipalities classified as cities, local councils govern small municipalities, and regional councils govern groups of communities. These bodies look after public services such as urban planning, zoning, the provision of water, emergency services, and education and culture, as per guidelines of the Ministry of Interior. Local governments consist of a governing council chaired by a mayor. The mayor and all council members are chosen in municipal elections.

The Ministry of Defense has responsibility for the administration of the occupied territories.

== See also ==
- Thirty-seventh government of Israel
- 2022 Israeli legislative election
- List of political parties in Israel
- Judiciary of Israel
- Lists of Knesset members
- List of Knesset speakers
- Politics of Israel
