= Body image law =

Laws designed to improve people's body image

Body image law is the developing area of law that, according to Dr Marilyn Bromberg of the University of Western Australia Law School and Cindy Halliwell, a law student at Deakin University, "encompasses the bills, laws and government actions (such as establishing parliamentary inquiries and creating policies) that may help to improve the body image of the general public, and particularly of young people". Among the reasons for implementing law in this area is to prevent the images of unhealthily thin women causing poor body image which can, along with other factors, lead to an eating disorder.

== Laws ==
The Israeli government passed a body image law in 2012 which became operational the following year. The law requires models to have a minimum body mass index to work and if an image was photoshopped to make the model appear thinner, it must have a warning. The warning must state that the image was modified and it must take up at least seven percent of the image. Breaches can result in a civil lawsuit.

The French Government passed a similar law in 2015 which came into effect in 2017. This law requires that models provide their employers with a "medical certificate, valid for up to two years, confirming their general physical well-being and the fact that they are not excessively underweight." The BMI of models older than 16 will also be taken into consideration, when determining their overall health.

In contrast to the Israeli law, breaching it attracts criminal sanctions. Additionally, any photo that has been digitally altered must be labeled as such; failure to label these photos will result in a "fine of 37,500 euros, or more than $41,000," and hiring a model without the verified medical certificate and requirements "carries a fine of €75,000 and six months in jail." The law dictates that digitally altered images must be labeled "applies only to advertising, not to editorial images in magazines or newspapers."

The Greater London Authority banned advertisements that promote unhealthy body image on Transport for London public transport in 2016. Similarly, Trondheim in Norway banned advertisements that promote unhealthy body image in public places in 2017.

The Australian Government's position in this area is that it is up to industry to solve the problem of poor body image. Likewise, the previous Labor Government created a non-binding Voluntary Industry Code of Conduct on Body Image.
