= Uzi Fogelman =

Israeli jurist (born 1954)

Uzi Vogelman
- עוזי פוגלמן
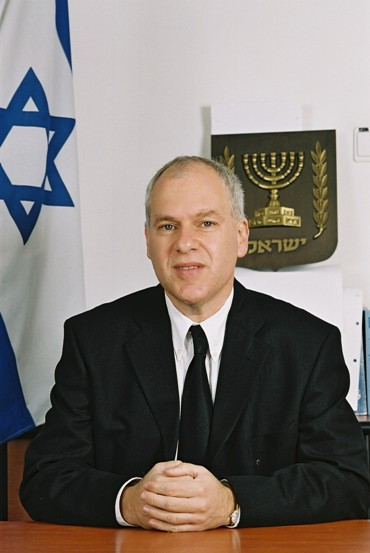

President of the Supreme Court of Israel
- Acting
- In office 16 October 2023 – 1 October 2024
- Preceded by: Esther Hayut
- Succeeded by: Yitzhak Amit

Deputy President of the Supreme Court of Israel
- In office 9 May 2022 – 1 October 2024
- Preceded by: Neal Hendel
- Succeeded by: Noam Sohlberg

Associate Justice of the Supreme Court of Israel
- In office 2009 – 1 October 2024
- Nominated by: Yaakov Neeman
- Appointed by: Shimon Peres

Personal details
- Born: 6 October 1954 (age 72)
- Education: Tel Aviv University (LLB); Hebrew University of Jerusalem (LLM); Harvard University (MPA)

Uzi Vogelman (Hebrew: עוזי פוגלמן; born 6 October 1954) is a former justice of the Supreme Court of Israel and served as the acting president of the Supreme Court of Israel from 16 October 2023 to 1 October 2024, as well as Deputy President from 9 May 2022 to 1 October 2024. Vogelman had a deep impact on Israeli jurisprudence, and especially during his time on the Supreme Court as a liberal justice, issuing several rulings that advanced the rights of minority groups in Israel.

== Life and career ==
Uzi Vogelman was born in Tel Aviv, Israel, in 1954. In 1972 he graduated from Ironi Alef High School in Tel Aviv, majoring in mathematics and physics. From 1972 to 1975 he served in the Israeli Defense Forces in the Nahal combat brigade. Vogelman completed his LL.B. degree at the Faculty of Law at Tel Aviv University and was admitted to the Israel Bar Association in 1980. Vogelman earned an LL.M. degree at the Hebrew University of Jerusalem in 1985, and a Master of Public Administration from the John F. Kennedy School of Government at Harvard University in the USA in 1990.

Vogelman served as an attorney in the State Attorney's Office from 1982 to 1995, first in the Criminal Division and the High Court of Justice Division, then as Deputy and Senior Deputy to the State Attorney.

From 1995 to 2000, Vogelman served as Head of the High Court of Justice Division of the State Attorney's Office and Director of the Department of Constitutional and Administrative Law. In 2000, Vogelman was appointed Judge on the Tel Aviv District Court.

In 2007, Vogelman was appointed Acting Justice of the Supreme Court of Israel, and in 2009 he was permanently appointed as a Justice of the Supreme Court. He became a permanent judge on the Supreme Court in 2009. On 9 May 2022, he was appointed by Israeli president Herzog as the Deputy President of the Supreme Court.

Vogelman was expected to become President of the Supreme Court in 2023 following Esther Hayut's retirement until his own retirement a year later, but due to the short term he would serve, he indicated he would decline the position. Nevertheless, since the Judicial Selection Committee did not choose a President of the Supreme Court, Fogelman became acting President on 16 October 2023. He retired on 1 October 2024, reaching the mandatory retirement age of 70, and expressing his support to Yitzhak Amit to become the next President of the Supreme Court of Israel in-line with the seniority system.

== Notable Rulings ==
- In 2009, the court granted a petition regarding an IDF order barring Palestinians from driving on Road 443 .
