= Noam Sohlberg =

Israeli jurist (born 1962)

- נֹעַם סוֹלְבֶּרְגְּ
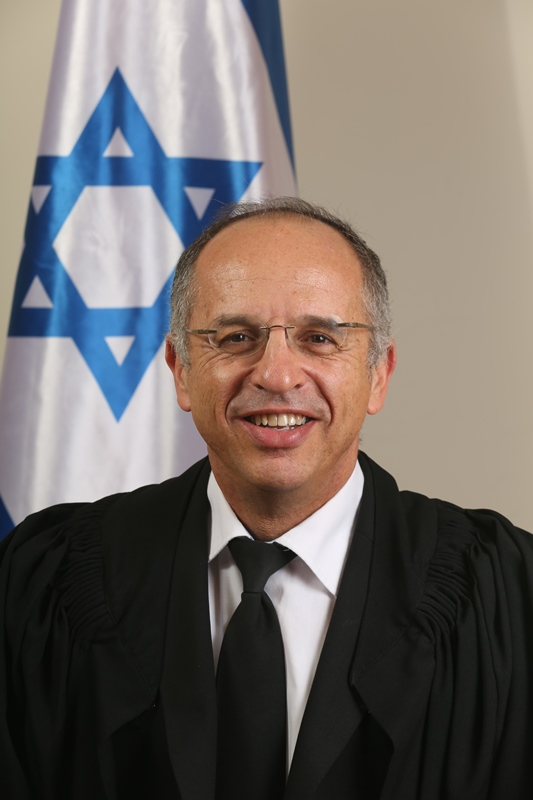

Deputy President of the Supreme Court of Israel
- Incumbent
- Assumed office 10 April 2025
- President: Yitzhak Amit
- Preceded by: Uzi Vogelman

Justice of the Supreme Court of Israel
- Incumbent
- Assumed office 21 February 2012
- Nominated by: Yaakov Neeman
- Appointed by: Shimon Peres

Personal details
- Born: 22 January 1962 (age 64)
- Education: Hebrew University of Jerusalem (LLM)

Noam Sohlberg (born 22 January 1962, Hebrew: נֹעַם סוֹלְבֶּרְגְּ) is an Israeli jurist who serves as Deputy President of the Supreme Court of Israel since 2025. He has been a justice of the Supreme Court since 2012. He also serves as Chairman of the Central Elections Committee for the 2026 elections to the 26th Knesset and as a member of the Judicial Selection Committee. He is considered to be a conservative justice.

== Early life ==
Sohlberg was born and raised in Haifa. His parents, Shaul and Yehudit Sohlberg, were Jewish immigrants from the Netherlands. He attended a religious high school in Haifa, and studied at Yeshivat Har Etzion in Alon Shvut. He did his mandatory military service in the Israeli Air Force, and completed his service with the rank of Major.

== Legal career ==
After his military service, Sohlberg studied law at the Hebrew University of Jerusalem, during which he served as a teaching and research assistant at the Hebrew University Faculty of Law and as counsel for the Israeli National Council for the Promotion of the Rule of Law and Democracy. He graduated with an LLB in 1990, and completed a two-year internship in the civil law department in the State Attorney's Office, Supreme Court, and Attorney General's Office between 1990 and 1991. He was admitted to the Israel Bar Association in 1991, and served as a legal assistant to Attorney General Yosef Harish from 1991 to 1993, then as a prosecutor at the State Attorney's Office from 1993 to 1994, before serving as a senior legal assistant to Attorneys General Michael Ben-Yair and Elyakim Rubinstein between 1994 and 1998. He was also a lecturer at the Bar-Ilan University Faculty of Law from 1996 to 1999.

In 1998, he completed a Master of Laws at the Hebrew University of Jerusalem, and was appointed a judge on the Jerusalem Magistrate's Court. He became a judge on the Jerusalem District Court in 2005, and was appointed a judge on the Supreme Court in 2012. He began serving on the Supreme Court on 21 February 2012.

Sohlberg serves as Deputy President of the Supreme Court since 10 April 2025, with Yitzhak Amit who is the President of the Supreme Court since 13 February 2025. According to the Supreme Court's seniority system, he is expected to serve as President of the Supreme Court from 2028 to 2032.

== Personal life ==
Sohlberg lives in Alon Shvut, an Israeli settlement in the West Bank. He is married to Meira, with whom he had five daughters. His daughter Hadas suffered from Rett syndrome, and died in 2018 at age 33.

His home was attacked on 3 June by Ultra-Orthodox rioters who were protesting. The following day, 18 of the 62 arrested suspects were released, while 44 were "ordered to remain in custody." An initial investigation by Israeli police found that it was an organized event; the rioters, whose aim was to "physically harm" Sohlberg, arrived on buses, broke windows and vandalized a car. The Jerusalem Magistrate’s Court lengthened the detention of 52 suspects on 7 June until 10 June. Four men were indicted on 14 June on charges of rioting, while two of them were also charged with "trespassing in order to commit a crime."
