= Daniel Friedmann =

Israeli law professor and politician

- דניאל פרידמן
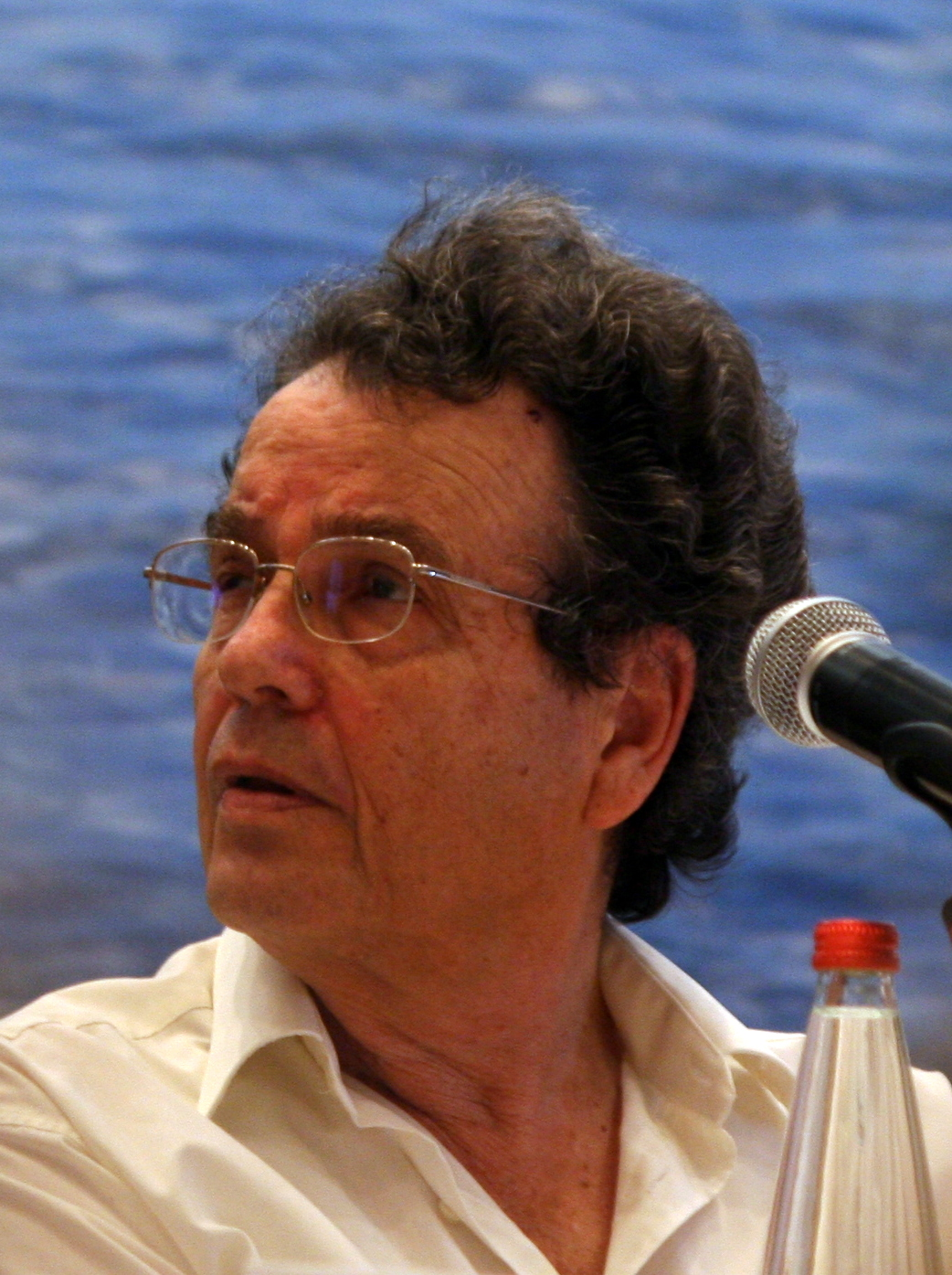
- Friedmann in 2012

Ministerial roles
- 2007–2009: Minister of Justice

Personal details
- Born: 17 April 1936 (age 90) Mandatory Israel

Daniel Friedmann (Hebrew: דניאל פרידמן; born 17 April 1936) is a former professor at and dean of the Tel Aviv University Faculty of Law. He served as the Minister of Justice of Israel from 2007 to 2009, having been appointed by then-Prime Minister Ehud Olmert. He was sworn in on February 7, 2007, succeeding Tzipi Livni. In 2009 he was succeeded by Ya'akov Ne'eman.

== Early life ==
Friedmann was born in Mandatory Palestine into a family that had lived there for seven generations. He studied law at the Hebrew University of Jerusalem, receiving a master's degree in 1957. He also served as a legal officer in the Israel Defense Forces. Friedmann clerked for Israeli Supreme Court judge Yoel Zussman from 1959 to 1961 and studied at the London School of Economics from 1961 to 1962. He was admitted to the Israeli bar in 1963. From 1963 to 1965 he worked as a lawyer in Tel Aviv before beginning his academic career. He received a doctorate in law from the Hebrew University of Jerusalem in 1967 and an LLM from Harvard Law School in 1971.

== Academic career ==
Friedmann was a professor of law at Tel Aviv University in the 1960s and 70s, including a stint as dean of the faculty of law there between 1974 and 1978. He subsequently taught law in the United States at Harvard, Penn, and Fordham, and in the United Kingdom at Queen Mary, University of London.

Friedmann has authored numerous legal articles and treatises in Hebrew and English.

== Awards and honours ==
Friedmann is the recipient of several Israeli and international awards, including the Zeltner Prize (awarded to an outstanding jurist), the Sussman Prize, the Minkoff Prize, and the Israel Prize, in 1991, for law.

== Politics and government ==
Friedman had been a member of the now-defunct Democratic Movement for Change party, and later appeared at the symbolic 120th place on the Knesset electoral list of one of its successor parties, Shinui, in the 2003 elections.

Israeli Prime Minister Ehud Olmert appointed Friedmann as the Minister of Justice on February 6, 2007. He was confirmed by the Cabinet unanimously and by the Knesset (50-24-1) on February 7. He was sworn in the same day.

The initial reaction to appointment was mixed, but the commentators agree that Friedmann is strongly critical of the Israeli Judiciary. In the past Friedmann has declared a preference for reforming the system by which justices are appointed to the Israeli Supreme Court.

== See also ==
- List of Israel Prize recipients
