= Esther Hayut =

Israeli jurist (born 1953)

- אֶסְתֵּר חַיּוּת
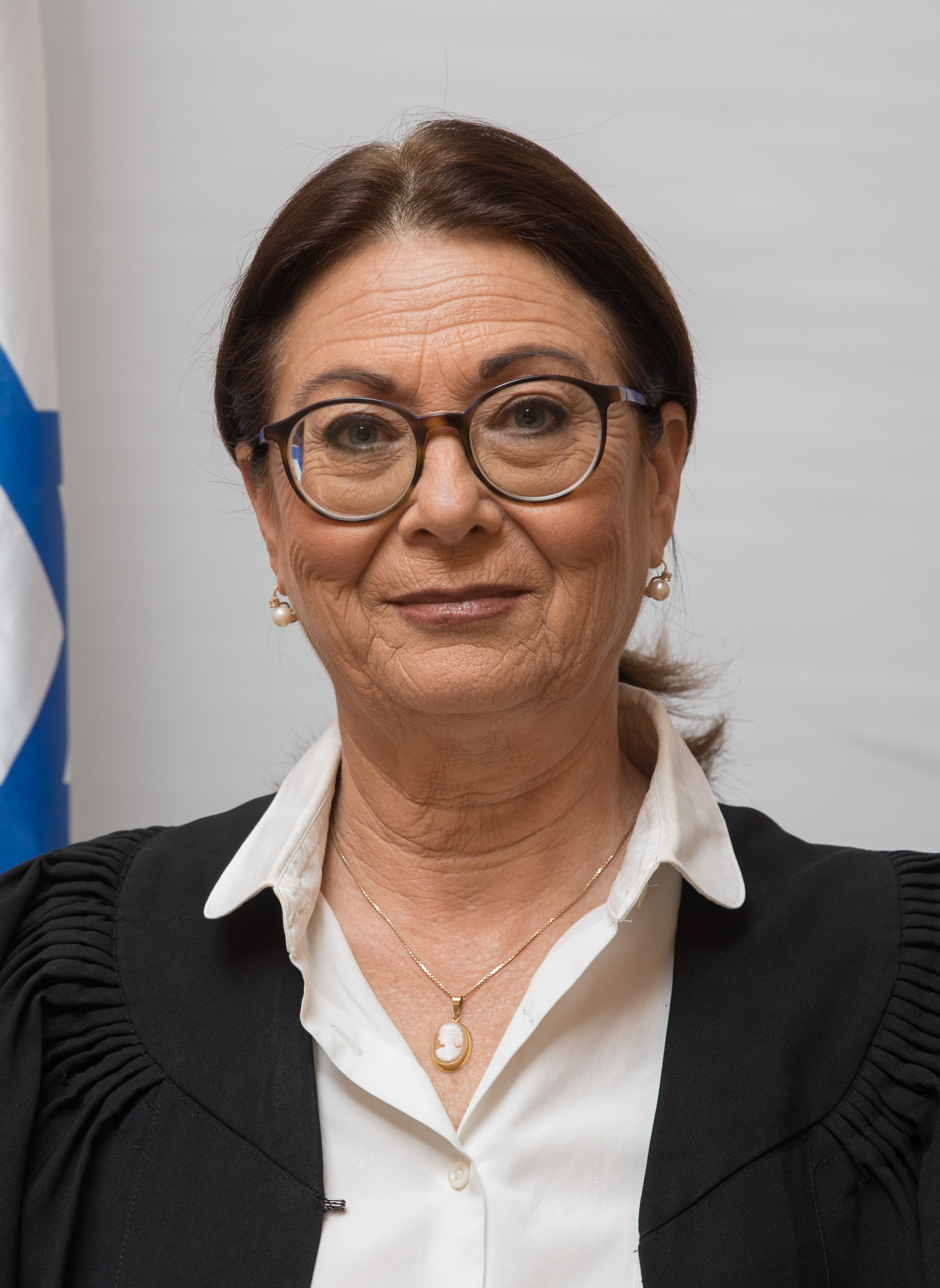

President of the Supreme Court of Israel
- In office 26 October 2017 – 16 October 2023
- Deputy: Hanan Melcer; Neal Hendel; Uzi Fogelman
- Preceded by: Miriam Naor
- Succeeded by: Yitzhak Amit (2025)

Justice of the Supreme Court of Israel
- In office 26 March 2004 – 16 October 2023
- Nominated by: Tzipi Livni
- Appointed by: Moshe Katzav

Personal details
- Born: 16 October 1953 (age 72) Herzliya, Israel
- Education: Tel Aviv University (LLB)

Esther Hayut (Hebrew: אֶסְתֵּר חַיּוּת; born 16 October 1953) is an Israeli jurist who served as president of the Supreme Court of Israel from October 2017 to October 2023, and as Justice of the Supreme Court of Israel from 2004 to 2023. She is considered to have been a progressive and liberal justice in the Supreme Court of Israel, playing a key role in many landmark cases throughout her tenure.

== Early life ==
Esther "Esti" Avni was born in Herzliya, Israel, in the Shaviv ma'abara (today the Yad HaTesha neighborhood) to Yehuda and Yehudit Avni, who were both Romanian Holocaust survivors. Her parents divorced when she was a toddler, and her father emigrated to the United Kingdom. She grew up in her grandparents' home in the Neve Amal neighborhood of Herzliya. At age 17, she moved to Eilat to live with her mother, who had remarried. She completed high school in Eilat in 1971. After graduating high school, she was conscripted into the Israel Defense Forces, where she served in the Central Command Band.

After her discharge from the army, Hayut attended law school at Tel Aviv University, graduating in 1977. During her law studies, she met her husband, David Hayut, with whom she has two sons. Hayut interned at the law firm of Haim Yosef Zadok, a former Israeli Minister of Justice, where she stayed on to work as an associate lawyer between 1977 and 1985. After leaving the firm, Hayut opened an independent office together with her husband, specializing in commercial law and tort law.

== Judicial career ==
Hayut was appointed judge of the Tel Aviv Magistrates Court in March 1990, acting judge of the Tel Aviv District Court in October 1996, and judge of the Tel Aviv District Court in September 1997. She served as an acting justice of the Supreme Court from March 2003 and as justice of the Supreme Court of Israel since May 2004.

In May 2015 Hayut was appointed Chairperson of the Central Election Committee for the 20th Knesset. Hayut was unanimously elected to replace Miriam Naor as the Chief Justice of the Supreme Court in 2017 according to the seniority method used in Israel.

In January 2023, Hayut spoke against proposed judicial reforms, calling them "an unbridled attack ... a plan to crush the judicial system" at a conference of the Israel Association of Public Law. On 1 January 2024, the Supreme Court led by Hayut, issued a narrow 8-to-7 decision, that the Knesset law blocking the court's use of the "reasonableness" doctrine was unconstitutional, overturning the law—thus self-validating, reasserting and reinforcing the court's own authority to use the "reasonableness" standard, at its discretion, to review and overturn Knesset-passed laws. At the same time, by a broad 12–3 majority, the Supreme Court ruled that it had the right to review any Knesset-passed Basic Law, and decide on its constitutional legitimacy. Hayut is said to have played a key role in shaping the doctrine that limits the Knesset’s authority. She emphasized that while the Knesset has broad powers, they are not unlimited and that amendments cannot undermine Israel’s core identity as a Jewish and democratic state.

Hayut retired on 15 October 2023, legally mandated for Supreme Court presidents when reaching 70, with no permanent replacement named. Uzi Vogelman was expected to become president in 2023 following Hayut's retirement until his own retirement a year later, but due to the short term he would serve, he indicated he would decline the position. Nevertheless, as Deputy President of the Supreme Court, Vogelman became acting president on 16 October 2023.

Hayut's first public remarks since retiring were made in 2024, where she expressed concerns about the government led by Netanyahu desires to try again to pass judicial reform laws. She also raised concerns about threats to the independence of several important institutions, including the judiciary, universities and the media.

== Awards ==
In 2022, Hayut was chosen by Forbes as one of the "50 over 50 women leading the way throughout Europe, the Middle East and Africa."

On 23 December 2024 Hayut was conferred an Honorary Doctorate of Philosophy by the University of Haifa.

== See also ==
- Women in Israel
