= Yitzhak Kahan =

Former President of the Supreme Court of Israel

- יצחק כהן

6th President of the Supreme Court of Israel
- In office 1982–1983
- Preceded by: Moshe Landau
- Succeeded by: Meir Shamgar

Personal details
- Born: November 15, 1913 Brody, Galicia, Austria-Hungary
- Died: April 24, 1985 (aged 71)

Yitzhak Kahan (Hebrew: יצחק כהן; November 15, 1913 – April 24, 1985) was President of the Supreme Court of Israel from 1982 until 1983. He was the Chairman of the Commission of Inquiry into the Events at the Refugee Camps in Beirut also known as the Kahan Commission, which was established to investigate the Sabra and Shatila massacre.

Born in Brody, Galicia, Austria-Hungary, he was the brother of Rav Kalman Kahana, a former Knesset member. He studied law, administration, and economics at the University of Lviv before emigrating to Mandatory Palestine in 1935.

In 1950, he was appointed a magistrate judge in Haifa, and he became a district judge in, 1953. On October 7, 1970, Kahan was appointed to the Supreme Court of Israel.

On March 26, 1981, he was appointed President of the Supreme Court of Israel.
