= Ofer Grosskopf =

Israeli jurist (born 1969)

- עֹפֶר גְּרוֹסְקוֹפְּף
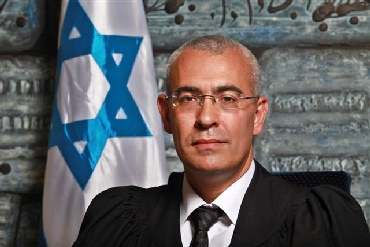
- Ofer Grosskopf

Justice of the Supreme Court of Israel
- Incumbent
- Assumed office 27 March 2018

Personal details
- Born: October 12, 1969 (age 56) Israel
- Education: Tel Aviv University (LL.B.), (MA), (LL.D.); Harvard Law School (LL.M.)

Ofer Grosskopf (Hebrew: עֹפֶר גְּרוֹסְקוֹפְּף; born 12 October 1969) is an Israeli jurist who has served as a justice of the Supreme Court of Israel since 2018. He is considered a moderate liberal on the Supreme Court and one of the most prominent legal scholars in Israel.

== Early life and education ==
Grosskopf was born in Israel in 1969 to Yossi and Ayala Grosskopf, and grew up in Herzliya. His father was a computer project manager and his mother was a laboratory technician at the Tel Aviv University School of Dental Research. He has a younger sister, Yael.

In 1988, he joined the Atuda program, deferring his mandatory military service to study law and economics at Tel Aviv University. He completed a Bachelor of Arts in economics in 1990, a Bachelor of Laws in 1991, and a Master of Arts in economics in 1992. He subsequently earned a Master of Laws from Harvard Law School and a Doctor of Juridical Science with distinction from Tel Aviv University in 1999.

== Legal career ==
From 1991 to 1997, Grosskopf served as an officer in the Israel Defense Forces, first as a legal adviser in the Military Advocate General's Office, then as a legal counsel to the military's housing projects. After completing his doctorate at Tel Aviv University under the direction of Professor Daniel Friedmann in 1999, Grosskopf worked as a research assistant to Friedmann.

Although Grosskopf's law career did not involve engaging in litigation, he represented his father in a lawsuit against Bituah Leumi in 1999.

Grosskopf was a member of the Faculty of Law at the College of Management Academic Studies in 1996, and was appointed a Senior Lecturer in 2001. In 2002, he joined the Faculty of Law at Tel Aviv University, where he served as a Senior Lecturer from 2002 to 2006, then as an Associate Professor from 2006 to 2009 and Vice Dean from 2008 to 2009.

In 2009, he was appointed a judge on the Lod District Court. In 2018, he was appointed to serve on the Supreme Court. He assumed office upon the retirement of judge Yoram Danziger.

== Personal life ==
Grosskopf is married to Batya and has four sons. He lives in Kfar Saba.
