= Asher Grunis =

Former President of the Supreme Court of Israel

- אשר דן גרוניס
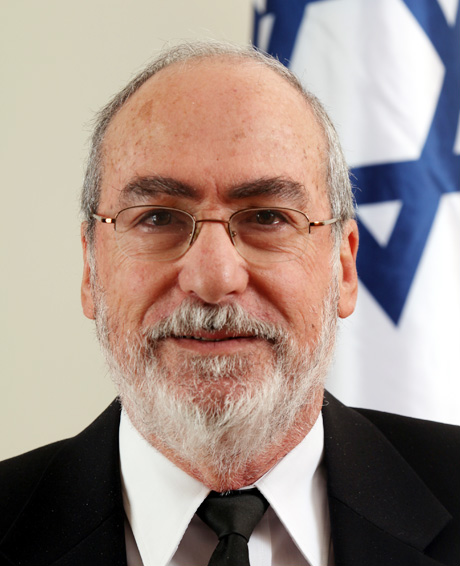

President of the Supreme Court of Israel
- In office 2012–2015
- Preceded by: Dorit Beinisch
- Succeeded by: Miriam Naor

Personal details
- Born: January 17, 1945 (age 81) Tel Aviv, Mandatory Palestine
- Spouse: Rene Grunis
- Children: 3
- Education: Hebrew University of Jerusalem; University of Virginia Law School; Osgoode Hall Law School

Asher Dan Grunis (Hebrew: אשר דן גרוניס ; born January 17, 1945) was the President of the Supreme Court of Israel between 2012 and 2015. He was appointed to the position on February 28, 2012, after the retirement of Dorit Beinisch. He retired from the bench in January 2015 at the age of 70.

== Biography ==
Asher Dan Grunis was born in Tel Aviv. He was named for his grandfather, Rav Asher Grunis (1877-1937), the rabbi of Cardiff, Wales. Grunis served in the Israeli Army (1962–1965), earned an LL.B. degree (1968) from the Hebrew University in Jerusalem and was admitted to the Israeli bar in 1969. In 1972 he earned a Master of Law (LL.M.) degree from the University of Virginia in the United States before being awarded a D.Jur. from Osgoode Hall Law School in Canada. Grunis served as a Justice of the Supreme Court of Israel from 2003 to January 2015.

== Personal life ==
Grunis is married to Rina Meshel-Grunis, a former judge of the Tel-Aviv District Court. He has three daughters and two grandsons.
