= Daphne Barak-Erez =

Israeli jurist (born 1965)

- דפנה ברק-ארז
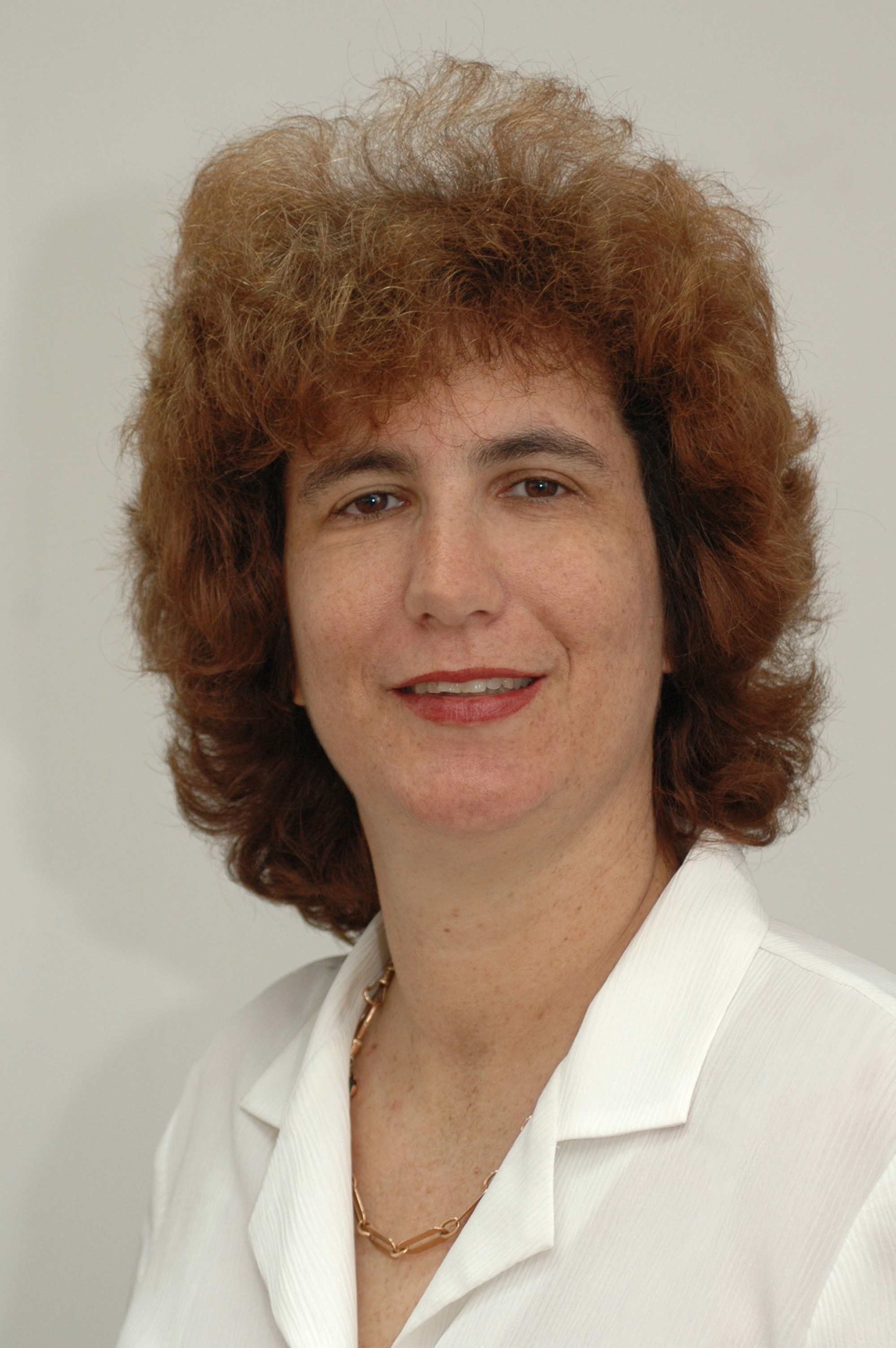
- Daphne Barak-Erez, 2007

Justice of the Supreme Court of Israel
- Incumbent
- Assumed office 31 May 2012

Personal details
- Born: January 2, 1965 (age 61) United States
- Education: Tel Aviv University (LLB, LLM, JSD)

Daphne Barak-Erez (Hebrew: דפנה ברק-ארז; born 2 January 1965) is an Israeli jurist serving as a justice of the Supreme Court of Israel since 2012. She has been described as a liberal justice.

== Biography ==
Daphne Barak-Erez was born in the United States to Israeli parents, and became a citizen by birthright of the United States. The family later returned to Israel, where she was raised. She studied law at Tel Aviv University (TAU) as part of the Atuda program, earning Bachelor of Laws, Master of Laws, and Doctor of Philosophy degrees, and did postdoctoral research at Harvard University. She served in the Military Advocate General's Office of the Israel Defense Forces, and was discharged from regular service with the rank of captain. She continued serving in the reserves and reached the rank of sgan aluf (lieutenant colonel).

In 2012, she renounced her US citizenship as required by Israeli law in order to take up her Supreme Court position.

== Legal and academic career ==
Barak-Erez was appointed a lecturer at the University of Haifa Faculty of Law in 1991, and at TAU's Faculty of Law in 1992. She was later appointed senior lecturer and associate professor, eventually becoming a full professor in 2004. She was also taught at IDC Herzliya (now Reichman University) and the College of Management. She was granted the Stewart and Judy Colton Chair in 2007 and appointed Dean of the Faculty of Law at TAU in the fall of 2011. As a scholar, she mainly specializes in constitutional and administrative law. Her other areas of study include legal history and feminist jurisprudence. In 2009 she was one of the final candidates for the position of Attorney General. Barak-Erez was a visiting professor at various universities, including Columbia, Stanford, Duke, University of Toronto, UVA, and UCLA, as well as a visiting researcher in other distinguished institutions such as Harvard, Yale, Cambridge, and the Max Planck Institute.

Barak-Erez has also served in public positions, such as Chairperson of the Council for Administrative Tribunals and as a member of the Council for Higher Education in Israel.

She has served as Chairperson of the Israeli Association of Public Law and President of the Israeli Law & Society Association.

== Judicial career ==
As of 2025, Barak-Erez is the third most senior justice on the Supreme Court of Israel. She has been noted for liberal approach and social sensitivity.

She wrote the lead opinion in the court's decision from 2022 that invalidated the practice of cutting off electricity consumers for non-payment without a hearing. In a judgment in the area of defamation law and freedom of speech Barak-Erez held that a social media user may be liable for "sharing" a defamatory post, but not for merely "liking" it. She was part of the 15-justice panel which decided on January 1, 2024 on invalidating the constitutional amendment aimed at limiting the power of the Supreme Court to review government decisions for lack of reasonableness, writing one of the concurring opinions in this matter.

Barak-Erez serves as the Chair of the Ethics Committee of Judges (since 2023) as well as a member of the Judicial Selection Committee (since 2023).

== Publications ==
Barak-Erez is the author and editor of 25 books and more than 140 articles and book chapters, including Outlawed Pigs: Law, Religion and Culture in Israel (University of Wisconsin Press, 2007), Administrative Law (in Hebrew, 4 volumes, 2010, 2013, 2017) and Biblical Judgments: New Legal Readings in the Hebrew Bible (University of Michigan Press, 2024).

== Awards and recognition ==
She has been awarded several prizes, including TAU's annual Zeltner Prize, the Rector's Prize for Excellence in Teaching at Tel Aviv University (three times), the Cheshin Prize for Academic Excellence in Law, named after Shneur Zalman Cheshin, justice of the first Israeli Supreme Court, the Woman of the City Award by the City of Tel Aviv, the Women in Law Award by the Israel Bar Association, and the Gorni Prize in Public Law.

In November 2013, Daphne Barak-Erez accepted an award in Israel's name, for progress made in reducing gender gaps. The award was presented by Women in Parliament Global Forum during a ceremony at the European Parliament in Brussels.

She is a member of the American Law Institute and the International Academy of Comparative Law.

She has been awarded multiple honorary doctorates by Sciences Po (in 2017) and Roma Tre University (in 2024).

== See also ==
- Israeli judicial system
