= Yitzhak Amit =

Israeli jurist (born 1958)

- יצחק עמית
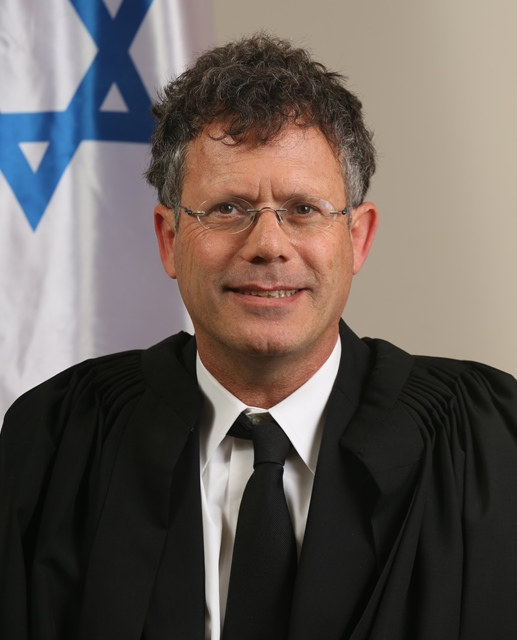
- Official portrait, 2015

President of the Supreme Court of Israel
- Incumbent
- Assumed office 13 February 2025; Acting: 1 October 2024 – 13 February 2025
- Deputy: Noam Sohlberg
- Preceded by: Uzi Fogelman (acting)

Justice of the Supreme Court of Israel
- Incumbent
- Assumed office 14 October 2009
- Nominated by: Yaakov Neeman
- Appointed by: Shimon Peres

Personal details
- Born: Yitzhak Goldfreund; 20 October 1958 (age 67) Tel Aviv, Israel
- Education: Hebrew University of Jerusalem (LLB)

Yitzhak Amit (Hebrew: יצחק עמית; né Goldfreund; 20 October 1958) is an Israeli jurist currently serving as President of the Supreme Court of Israel since February 2025, having been the court's acting president from October 2024 to February 2025. He has been a justice of the Supreme Court of Israel since 2009. He is widely considered as a liberal justice and has had a major impact on the Supreme Court.

== Early life and education ==
Amit was born as Yitzhak Goldfreund (Hebrew: יצחק גולדפריינד) and raised in Tel Aviv. He attended a religious high school and graduated in 1976. He served in the Israel Defense Forces as an officer in Unit 8200, and was discharged in 1980. In 1981, he began studying law at the Hebrew University of Jerusalem and graduated cum laude with a Bachelor of Laws in 1985.

== Career ==
Amit was granted a license to practice law in 1986 and worked as a lawyer in private practice.

In 1997, he was appointed a judge in the Acre Magistrates Court, and subsequently a judge in the Haifa Magistrates Court. He then became a judge in the Haifa District Court. He was elected to the Supreme Court in August 2009, and took office in October 2009.

== Appointment controversies and misconduct allegations ==
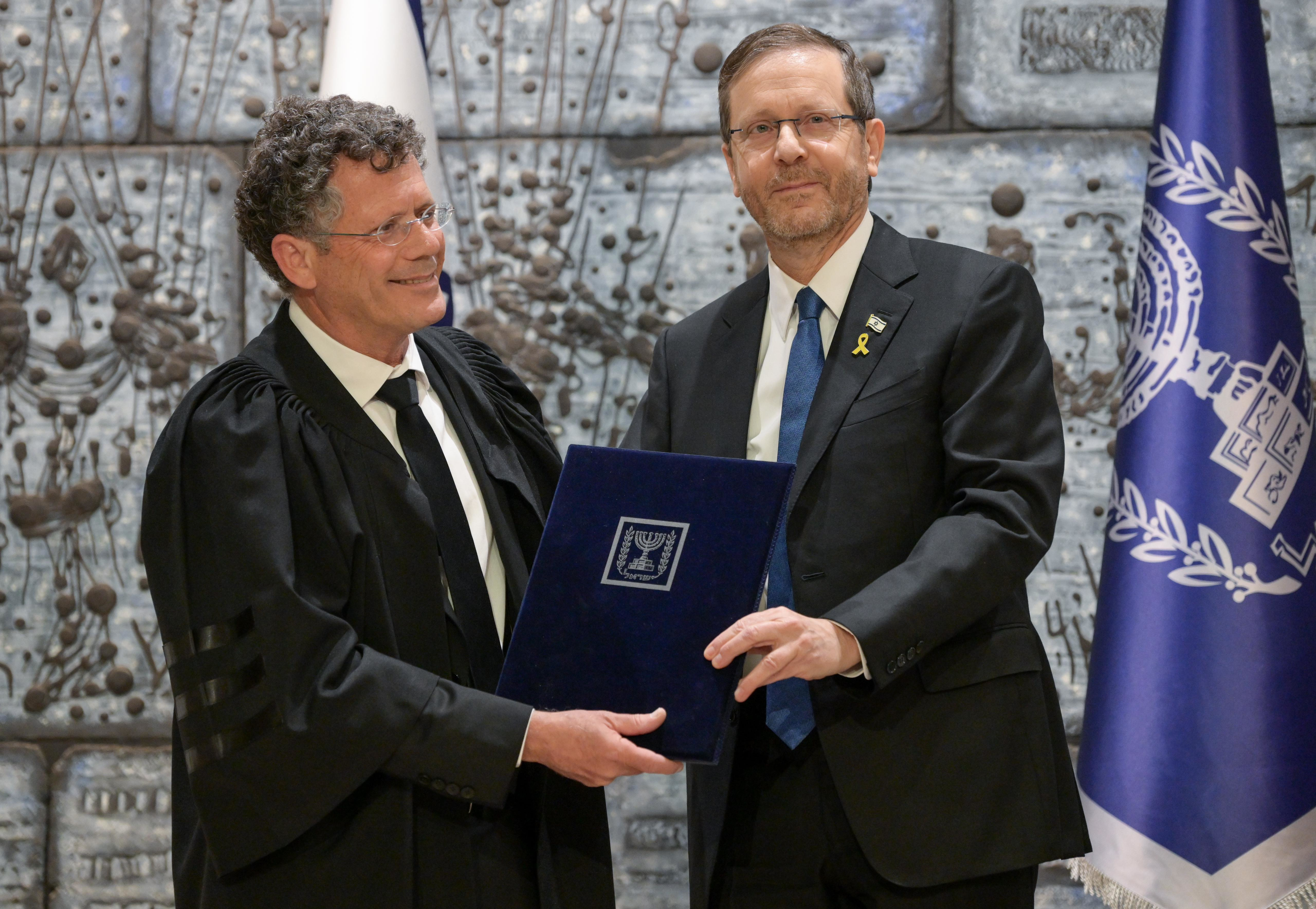
The swearing-in ceremony of Judge Yitzchak Amit as President of the Supreme Court of Israel. In the background is an Israeli volcanic ash artwork.

The appointment of Amit as permanent President of the Supreme Court was the subject of a prolonged constitutional crisis between 2023 and 2025. In 2023, Amit was expected to become President of the Supreme Court, following Esther Hayut's retirement. However, Justice Minister Yariv Levin blocked the appointment for over a year, bypassing the traditional "seniority system" and citing various allegations of professional misconduct as justification for the delay. Due to the objection, Uzi Vogelman became acting President of the Supreme Court of Israel from 16 October 2023 until he stepped down after reaching retirement age on 1 October 2024. Amit then became the acting President of the Supreme Court of Israel after Uzi Vogelman stepped down, until a permanent president would be appointed by the Judicial Selection Committee. Thereafter, Justice Minister Yariv Levin blocked the accession of Amit as permanent president who was nominated based on the long-standing seniority-based convention, arguing he possesses discretion regarding the committee's convening, the identity of the candidates to be presented for a vote, and the timing of such a vote, but was forced to call a vote following a unanimous Supreme Court decision in 2025. Amit was thereafter appointed president on 26 January 2025, and sworn in on 13 February 2025 by Israeli president Isaac Herzog with Levin boycotting the inauguration, and subsequent meetings in what has been branded as a constitutional crisis.

=== Misconduct Allegations ===
During the appointment process, Levin and right-wing advocacy groups, such as the Lavi Organization, submitted numerous complaints to the Ombudsman for Judicial Complaints.

- The "Directors' Pool" Conflict: In December 2025, Ombudsman Asher Kula upheld a complaint regarding Amit’s participation in a High Court petition concerning the government’s "directors' pool" (a list of candidates for state-owned company boards). The Commissioner found that while there was no evidence of improper intent, Amit had failed to disclose that his brother, Dov Goldfreund, was a member of the pool at the time of the ruling. Levin cited this finding to call for Amit's resignation.
- Bank Hapoalim and Real Estate Allegations: Levin also alleged conflicts of interest regarding cases involving Bank Hapoalim, where a relative reportedly held a senior position. Additionally, reports in Yedioth Ahronoth claimed Amit conducted private real estate dealings under his birth name, Goldfreund, while hearing cases from the law firms representing him. The Ombudsman dismissed the majority of these claims, noting that the use of his birth name in land registries did not constitute a "secret alias" or a conflict of interest.

=== 2025 Swearing-in Boycott ===
Following a Supreme Court ruling that compelled Levin to hold a vote, Amit was elected President on 26 January 2025. His swearing-in ceremony on 13 February 2025 was marked by an unprecedented boycott by Prime Minister Benjamin Netanyahu, Justice Minister Yariv Levin, and the entire cabinet. Levin characterized the court-ordered appointment as a "legal dictatorship" and has since refused to hold regular working meetings with Amit, a move President Isaac Herzog described as having "no place in a democracy."

== Personal life ==
Amit is married to Rebecca, a social worker by trade and the clinical coordinator at the Shiluv Institute for family and couples therapy. They reside in Mevaseret Zion.
