= Moshe Landau =

Israeli judge

- משה לנדוי
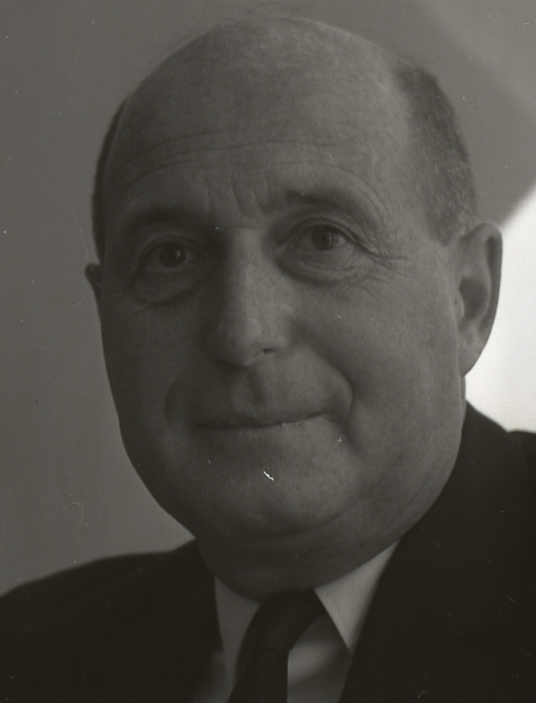

Supreme Court of Israel judge
- In office 1953–1982

President of the Supreme Court of Israel
- In office 1980–1982
- Preceded by: Yoel Zussman
- Succeeded by: Yitzhak Kahan

Personal details
- Born: 29 April 1912 Danzig, Kingdom of Prussia, Germany (present-day Gdańsk, Poland)
- Died: 1 May 2011 (aged 99) Jerusalem, Israel
- Education: University of London

Moshe Landau (Hebrew: משה לנדוי; 29 April 1912 – 1 May 2011) was an Israeli judge. He served on the Supreme Court of Israel from 1953 until his retirement in 1982. Landau was the fifth President of the Supreme Court, from 1980 to 1982.

Described as one of Israel's greatest judges and as one of the founders of Israeli law, Landau was credited with presiding over the Eichmann Trial, a landmark case related to the prosecution of Adolf Eichmann, a key figure in The Holocaust, in an "objective and stately manner". He played a crucial role in limiting government censorship and safeguarding civil rights through his legal decisions.

Landau's rulings sometimes obscured his personal political stance, yet he consistently opposed judicial activism, emphasizing the importance of judges avoiding political agendas to maintain public trust in the judicial system; those positions of his own are used until today as arguments in support of reform in the judiciary of Israel. Historians have praised his independence and openness to new ideas, highlighting his uncommon willingness to evolve and adapt his perspectives.

== Early life and education ==
Landau was born in Danzig, Germany (modern Gdańsk, Poland) to Isaac Landau and Betty née Eisenstädt. His father was a leading member of the Jewish Community of Danzig. In 1930, he finished high school in the Free City of Danzig and in 1933 he graduated cum laude from the University of London School of Law. That year, he immigrated to the British Mandate of Palestine.

== Judicial career ==
Having been admitted to the Palestine Bar in 1937, Landau attained the position of a judge in the Haifa Magistrate’s Court in 1940. He subsequently progressed to the District Court in 1948 before being appointed to the Supreme Court in 1953.

In 1957, Landau contributed significantly to the court-martial of the Criminal Court of Appeals, addressing the issue of lawful orders in a case involving the killing of 48 Arabs in Kafr Qasim.

In 1961, Landau presided over the landmark Eichmann trial. According to Israeli historian Tom Segev, Landau was dedicated to preserving order and fairness during the trial, even if it led to conflicts with those who aimed to use the trial for Holocaust education and Israeli nationalism. Landau, in an effort to maintain a genuine trial atmosphere, restricted testimony and evidence unrelated to Eichmann's role, minimizing dramatic elements and emphasizing the trial's prestige and respectability.

In 1962, he set a precedent by overruling a censor decision, impacting the freedom of information landscape.

His involvement in politics included chairing the Israeli Central Elections Committee in 1965, where he notably disqualified a "subversive" list from running for the Knesset. In 1974, he became a member of the Agranat Commission, tasked with investigating intelligence and security failures leading to the Yom Kippur War.

Progressing in his judicial career, Landau became Deputy President of the Supreme Court in 1976 and ascended to the position of President of the Supreme Court from 1980 to 1982. In 1987, he headed the Landau Commission, investigating Shin Bet's procedures. The commission found instances of perjury and legal violations, acknowledging the use of "moderate physical pressure" in interrogations. However, this drew criticism from human rights groups, who maintained that the practices authorized by the commission amounted to torture. The commission's report faced legal challenges and was nullified in 1999 by a Supreme Court ruling.

Landau's rulings occasionally left his personal political stance unclear, but he consistently opposed judicial activism, cautioning against judges pursuing political agendas to preserve public trust in the judicial system. Notably, he overturned a government decision to temporarily close two newspapers critical of the government, establishing an enduring free-press standard. However, in his role as head of the Central Election Committee, he disqualified an Arab-Israeli Socialist party from elections, deeming its platform "subversive" and a threat to the state's existence.

Historian and senior fellow at the Israel Democracy Institute, Anita Shapira, commended Landau for his independence and receptivity to novel ideas, noting that he demonstrated a rare willingness to evolve and alter his perspectives.

== Other positions held ==
Landau served as chairman of the World Zionist Congress tribunal and of the Advisory Commissions on Israel Land Laws Reforms, Criminal Procedures and Administrative Tribunals. He was the first chairman of the Yad Vashem Commission for the Designation of the Righteous Among the Nations.

From 1956 to 1962 and from 1965 to 1966, Landau served as chairman of the board of directors of the Technion – Israel Institute of Technology.

== Awards and honours ==
Landau received honorary doctorates from the Technion in 1980 and from the Hebrew Union College in 1997.

In 1991, he was awarded the Israel Prize for law. In 1993, he was made an honorary chairman of the Technion's board of directors.

== Death ==
Landau died in Jerusalem on 1 May 2011 after suffering a heart attack.

President Shimon Peres stated, "The State of Israel will remember Moshe Landau as a model for ideological and brave leadership." Former Supreme Court President Aharon Barak described him as "one of our greatest judges" and as one of the "founders of Israeli law."

== See also ==
- List of Israel Prize recipients
