= Neal Hendel =

Justice of the Supreme Court of Israel

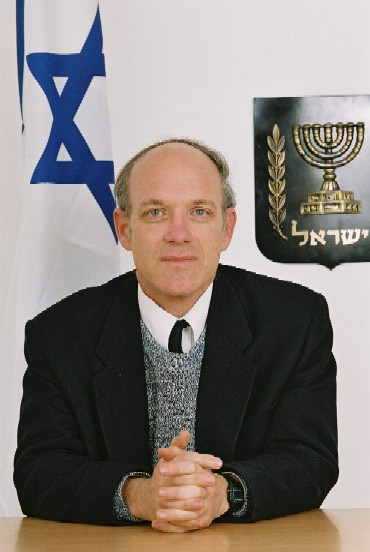
Neal Hendel

Neal Hendel (Hebrew: נִיל הֵנְדֵל; born 27 April 1952) is an American-born Israeli judge. He was the Deputy President of the Supreme Court of Israel.

== Biography ==
Neal Hendel was born in the United States. He attended high school at the Yeshivah of Flatbush. After graduating in 1969, he attended New York University and graduated in 1973 with a BA in sociology and Jewish studies. He studied Talmud at Yeshiva University with Rabbi Joseph B. Soloveitchik. He then studied law at Hofstra University School of Law, and completed his J.D. degree in 1976. In 1983, Hendel made aliyah to Israel, and settled in Beersheba. His wife, Marcie, is a psychologist. The couple has five sons.

== Legal career ==
After his admission to the New York State Bar Association, he worked in the Legal Aid Office and in private practice.

From 1983 to 1988, he worked in the southern district prosecutor's office. In 1988, he became a judge on the Beersheba Magistrate's Court, a position he held until 1997. In 1997, he became a judge on the Beersheba District Court, eventually becoming its Vice-President. In 2009, he was appointed to serve on the Supreme Court by the Judicial Selection Committee.

He was appointed to director of Central Elections Committee (Israel) for the 23rd Knesset on 8 December 2019.
