= Supreme Court of Israel =

Highest court in the State of Israel

- בית המשפט העליון (Hebrew) المحكمة العليا (Arabic)
- Emblem of Israel (Note: Version of the emblem of Israel used by the Judicial Authority. court.gov.il)

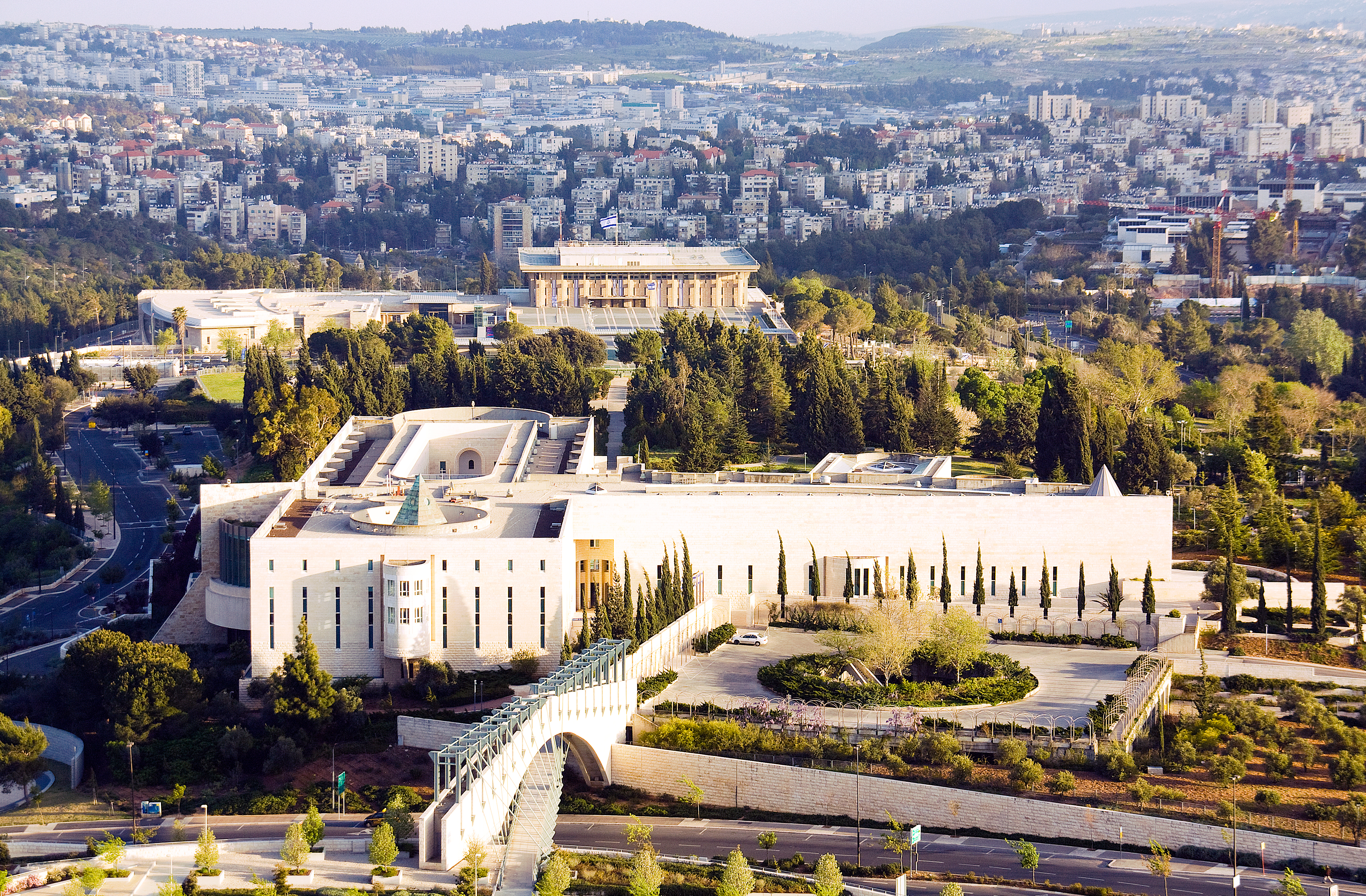
- Interactive map of Supreme Court of Israel
- 31°46′51″N 35°12′13″E
- Established: 1948; 78 years ago
- Location: Givat Ram, Jerusalem
- Coordinates: 31°46′51″N 35°12′13″E
- Composition method: Presidential appointment upon nomination by the Judicial Selection Committee
- Authorised by: Basic Laws of Israel
- Number of positions: 15 (11 currently)
- Website: https://supreme.court.gov.il

President
- Currently: Yitzhak Amit
- Since: 13 February 2025

Deputy President
- Currently: Noam Sohlberg
- Since: 10 April 2025

The Supreme Court of Israel (Hebrew: בֵּית הַמִּשְׁפָּט הָעֶלְיוֹן, romanized: Be(i)t HaMishpat HaElyon, Hebrew acronym Bagatz; Arabic: المحكمة العليا, romanized: al-Maḥkama al-‘Ulyā) is the highest court in Israel. It has ultimate appellate jurisdiction over all other courts, and in some cases original jurisdiction.

The Supreme Court consists of 15 judges appointed by the president of Israel, upon nomination by the Judicial Selection Committee. Once appointed, Judges serve until retirement at the age of 70 unless they resign or are removed from office. The Court is situated in Jerusalem's Givat Ram governmental campus, about half a kilometer from Israel's legislature, the Knesset. By the principle of binding precedent (stare decisis), Supreme Court rulings are binding upon every other court, except itself. Over the years, it has ruled on numerous sensitive issues, some of which relate to the Israeli–Palestinian conflict, the rights of Arab citizens, and discrimination between Jewish groups in Israel.

When ruling as the High Court of Justice (Hebrew: בֵּית מִשְׁפָּט גָּבוֹהַּ לְצֶדֶק, romanized: Be(i)t Mishpat Gavo'ah LeTzedek, also known as its acronym Bagatz, Hebrew: בג"ץ), the court rules on the legality of decisions of State authorities: government decisions, those of local authorities and other bodies and persons performing public functions under the law, and direct challenges to the constitutionality of laws enacted by the Knesset. The court may review actions by state authorities outside of Israel.

Yitzhak Amit is the president of the Supreme Court since 13 February 2025, with Noam Sohlberg as Deputy President since 10 April 2025. The Supreme Court has been a main focus of incumbent justice minister Yariv Levin, with an attempt in 2023 to limit the power of the Supreme Court failing and Levin refusing to meet Amit since 2025 in what has been branded as a constitutional crisis.

== Judicial appointments ==
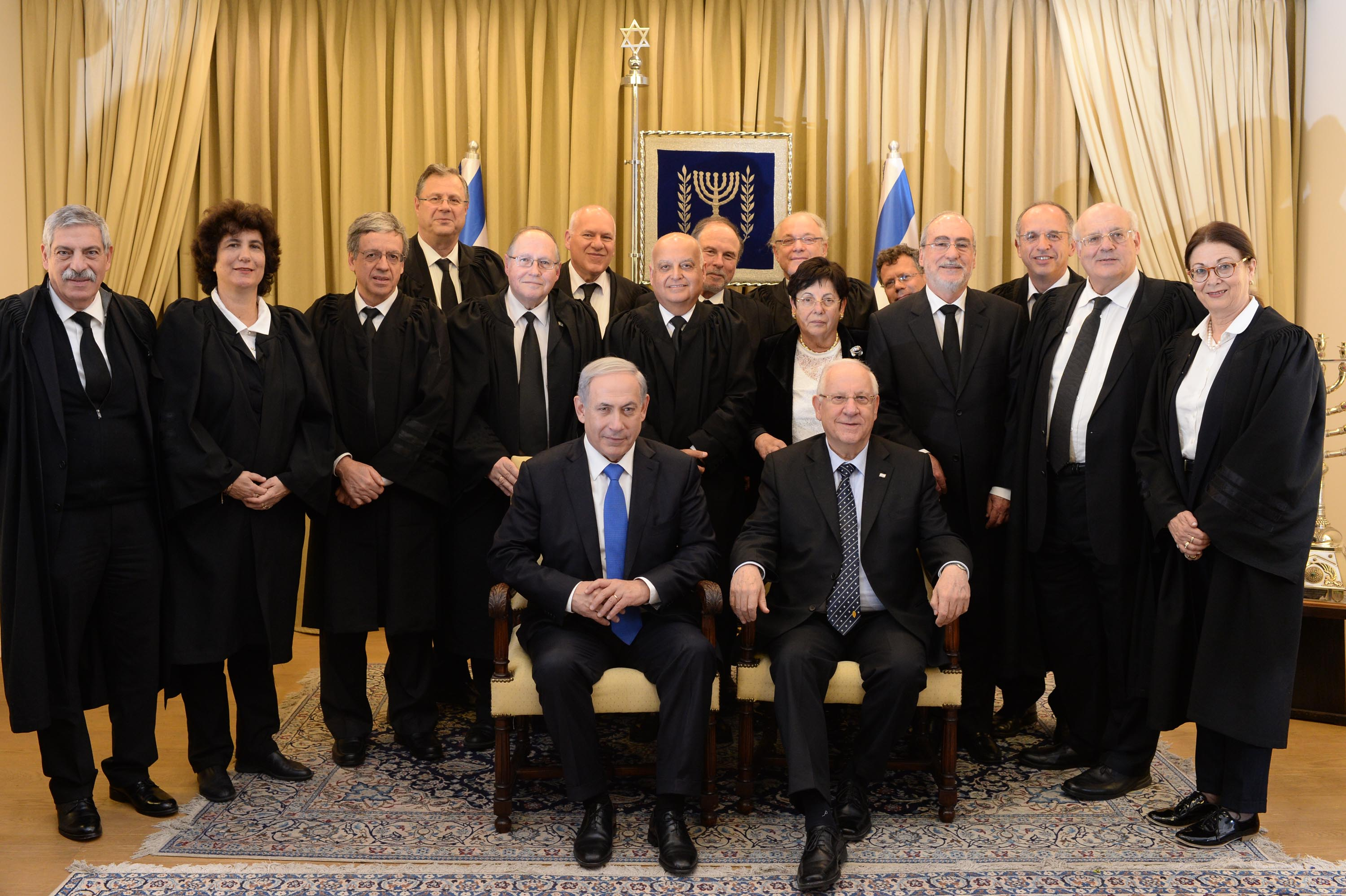
The Supreme Court of Israel with Prime Minister Benjamin Netanyahu and then-President Reuven Rivlin, 2015

Supreme Court justices are appointed by the President of Israel, from names submitted by the Judicial Selection Committee, which is composed of nine members: three Supreme Court Judges (including the President of the Supreme Court), two cabinet ministers (one of them being the Minister of Justice), two Knesset members, and two representatives of the Israel Bar Association. Appointing Supreme Court justices requires a majority of 7 of the 9 committee members, or two less than the number present at the meeting.

All candidates for appointment to the Supreme Court must have a minimum of five years of experience as a district court judge or otherwise at least ten years of professional legal experience including a minimum of five years practicing law in Israel. These requirements may be waived for a person recognized as an "eminent jurist", although this special category has only been used once for an appointment.

The three organs of state—the legislative, executive, and judicial branches of government—as well as the bar association are represented in the Judges' Nominations Committee. Thus, the shaping of the judicial body, through the manner of judicial appointment, is carried out by all the authorities together.

Supreme Court Judges cannot be removed from office except by a decision of the Court of Discipline, consisting of judges appointed by the President of the Supreme Court, or upon a decision of the Judicial Selection Committee—at the proposal of the Minister of Justice or the President of the Supreme Court—with the agreement of seven of its nine members.

The following are qualified to be appointed Judge of the Supreme Court: a person who has held office as a judge of a District Court for a period of five years, or a person who is inscribed, or entitled to be inscribed, in the roll of advocates, and has for not less than ten years—continuously or intermittently, and of which five years at least in Israel—been engaged in the profession of an advocate, served in a judicial capacity or other legal function in the service of the State of Israel or other service as designated in regulations in this regard, or has taught law at a university or a higher school of learning as designated in regulations in this regard. An "eminent jurist" can also be appointed to the Supreme Court.

At the head of the Supreme Court and at the head of the judicial system as a whole is the President of the Supreme Court, and the Deputy President. A judge serves until reaching 70 years of age, or the judge resigns, dies, is appointed to a position which is disqualifying from continued service as a judge, or is removed from office.

== Current justices ==
The number of Supreme Court justices is determined by a resolution of the Knesset. Currently, there are 11 justices with 4 vacant places.

As of October 2025, the Supreme Court justices are:

Position	Judge		Birth year and location	Nominated by	Appointed by	Start date	Expected retirement
President of the Supreme Court		Yitzhak Amit	1958, Israel	Yaakov Neeman	Shimon Peres	14 October 2009	20 October 2028
Deputy President of the Supreme Court		Noam Sohlberg	1962, Israel	Yaakov Neeman	Shimon Peres	21 February 2012	22 January 2032
Supreme Court Justice		Daphne Barak-Erez	1965, United States	Yaakov Neeman	Shimon Peres	31 May 2012	2 January 2035
Supreme Court Justice		David Mintz	1959, UK	Ayelet Shaked	Reuven Rivlin	13 June 2017	8 May 2029
Supreme Court Justice		Yael Willner	1959, Israel	Ayelet Shaked	Reuven Rivlin	30 October 2017	22 September 2029
Supreme Court Justice		Ofer Grosskopf	1969, Israel	Ayelet Shaked	Reuven Rivlin	27 March 2018	12 October 2039
Supreme Court Justice		Alex Stein	1957, Chișinău, USSR (now in Moldova)	Ayelet Shaked	Reuven Rivlin	9 August 2018	27 October 2027
Supreme Court Justice		Gila Canfy-Steinitz	1958, Israel	Gideon Sa'ar	Isaac Herzog	6 March 2022	October 2028
Supreme Court Justice		Khaled Kabub	1958, Israel	Gideon Sa'ar	Isaac Herzog	9 May 2022	3 March 2028
Supreme Court Justice		Yechiel Kasher	1961, Israel	Gideon Sa'ar	Isaac Herzog	9 June 2022	9 June 2031
Supreme Court Justice		Ruth Ronnen	1962, Israel	Gideon Sa'ar	Isaac Herzog	9 June 2022	November 2032
Supreme Court Justice	–	seat vacant	–	–	–	–	–
Supreme Court Justice	–	seat vacant	–	–	–	–	–
Supreme Court Justice	–	seat vacant	–	–	–	–	–
Supreme Court Justice	–	seat vacant	–	–	–	–	–

Keren Azulay and Lior Mishaly Shlomai serve as the Court Magistrate Judges (or "Registrars").

=== Court presidents ===
Below is a list of presidents of the Supreme Court.

- Moshe Smoira (1948–1954)
- Yitzhak Olshan (1954–1965)
- Shimon Agranat (1965–1976)
- Yoel Zussman (1976–1980)
- Moshe Landau (1980–1982)
- Yitzhak Kahan (1982–1983)
- Meir Shamgar (1983–1995)
- Aharon Barak (1995–2006)
- Dorit Beinisch (2006–2012)
- Asher Grunis (2012–2015)
- Miriam Naor (2015–2017)
- Esther Hayut (2017–2023)
- Uzi Fogelman (2023–2024)
- Yitzhak Amit (2025–)

== Roles of the Supreme Court ==
=== Appellate court ===
As an appellate court, the Supreme Court considers cases on appeal (criminal, civil, and military ) on judgments and other decisions of the District Courts. It also considers appeals on judicial and quasi-judicial decisions of various kinds, such as matters relating to the legality of Knesset elections and disciplinary rulings of the Bar Association.

=== High Court of Justice ===
As the High Court of Justice (Hebrew: בֵּית מִשְׁפָּט גָּבוֹהַּ לְצֶדֶק, romanized: Beit Mishpat Gavo'ah LeTzedek, also known as its acronym Bagatz, Hebrew: בג"ץ), the Supreme Court rules on matters within its original jurisdiction, primarily regarding the legality of decisions of State authorities: Government decisions, those of local authorities and other bodies and persons performing public functions under the law, and direct challenges to the constitutionality of laws enacted by the Knesset. The Israel Defense Forces are also subject to the HCJ's judicial review.

The court has broad discretionary authority to rule on matters in which it considers it necessary to grant relief in the interests of justice, and which are not within the jurisdiction of another court or tribunal. The High Court of Justice grants relief through orders such as injunction, mandamus and Habeas Corpus, as well as through declaratory judgments.

=== Further hearing ===
The Supreme Court can also sit at a “further hearing” on its own judgment. In a matter on which the Supreme Court has ruled, whether as a court of appeals or as the High Court of Justice, with a panel of three or more Judges, it may rule at a further hearing with a panel of a larger number of Judges. A further hearing may be held if the Supreme Court makes a ruling inconsistent with a previous ruling or if the Court deems that the importance, difficulty or novelty of a ruling of the Court justifies such hearing.

=== Retrial ===
A special power, unique to the Supreme Court, is the power to order a retrial on a criminal matter in which the defendant has been convicted by a final judgment. A ruling to hold a retrial may be made where the Court finds that evidence provided in the case was based upon lies or was forged; where new facts or evidence are discovered that are likely to alter the decision in the case in favor of the accused; where another has meanwhile been convicted of carrying out the same offense and it appears from the circumstances revealed in the trial of that other person that the original party convicted of the offense did not commit it; or, where there is a real concern for miscarriage of justice in the conviction. In practice, a ruling to hold a retrial is very rarely made.

=== Judicial opinions ===
The Court announces its judgments through individually signed opinions setting out the result and underlying reasoning. In general, there is a lead opinion for the majority, but there is no "opinion of the Court" as such. Each participating Judge will either note that she or he concurs in the lead opinion (and possibly another opinion as well) or write a separate concurrence. It is not unusual for most or all of the participating Judges to write separately, even when they agree as to the outcome.

The Court's opinions are available in Hebrew on its own website and from Nevo. A relatively small subset has been translated into English. These are available in a searchable online database at Versa. They can also be found on the Court's own site and have been published in hard copy in annual volumes by William S. Hein & Co. as the Israel Law Reports. In addition, the Israel Ministry of Foreign Affairs, in cooperation with the Court, has published three volumes of English translations of selected decisions entitled Judgments of the Israel Supreme Court: Fighting Terrorism within the Law. These are part of the Versa database and also can be found online at the MFA's website.

=== Intervention ===
In the 1980s and the 1990s, the Supreme Court established its role as a protector of human rights, intervening to secure freedom of speech and freedom to demonstrate, reduce military censorship, limit the use of certain military methods and promote equality between various sectors of the population, which has led to some criticism of judicial overreach.

== Composition ==
The Supreme Court, both as an appellate court and the High Court of Justice, is normally constituted of a panel of three Judges. A single Supreme Court Judge may rule on interim orders, temporary orders or petitions for an order nisi, and on appeals on interim rulings of District Courts, or on judgments given by a single District Court judge on appeal, and on a judgment or decision of the Magistrates’ Courts.

The Supreme Court sits as a panel of five Judges or more in a rehearing on a matter in which the Supreme Court sat with a panel of three Judges. The Supreme Court may sit as a panel of a larger uneven number of Judges than three in matters that involve fundamental legal questions and constitutional issues of particular importance.

=== Presiding Judge ===
In a case on which the President of the Supreme Court sits, the President is the Presiding Judge; in a case on which the Deputy President sits and the President does not sit, the Deputy President is the Presiding Judge; in any other case, the Judge with the greatest length of service is the Presiding Judge. The length of service, for this purpose, is calculated from the date of the appointment of the Judge to the Supreme Court.

== Public perception ==
According to a 2017 poll by non-profit organization Israel Democracy Institute, the Supreme Court is the only State institution that the majority of both Jewish (57%) and Arab citizens of Israel (54%) have trust in, marking a slight increase from their 2016 poll. The institute's 2017 poll on the statement "[t]he power of judicial review over Knesset legislation should be taken away from the Supreme Court" found that 58% of Israelis disagree, 36% agree, and 6% do not know.

Trust in the court dropped in a 2022 poll that showed 41% trust among Jews, and opposition to an "override clause", allowing the Knesset to nulify supreme court decisions with a simple-majority, dropping to 48%.

In 2025 a poll from Reichman University's Institute for Liberty & Responsibility revealed that public trust in the Supreme Court is more than twice as high as the public's trust in the government. The poll found that the institution with the highest amount of public trust is the IDF at 65 percent, followed by the Supreme Court at 44%, the government at 17% and the Knesset at 11%.

== Judicial reform attempts ==
The 2023 Israeli judicial reform is a proposed series of changes to the judicial system and the balance of powers in Israel put forward by the thirty-seventh government of Israel, and spearheaded by Deputy Prime Minister and Minister of Justice Yariv Levin and the Chair of the Knesset's Constitution, Law and Justice Committee, Simcha Rothman. It seeks to curb the judiciary's influence over lawmaking and public policy by limiting the Supreme Court's power to exercise judicial review, granting the government control over judicial appointments and limiting the authority of government legal advisors. If adopted, the reform would grant the Knesset the power to override Supreme Court rulings by a majority of 61 or more votes, diminish the ability of the court to conduct judicial review of legislation and of administrative action, prohibit the court from ruling on the constitutionality of basic laws, and change the makeup of the Judicial Selection Committee so that a majority of its members are appointed by the government. On 24 July 2023, the Knesset passed a bill that curbs the power of the Supreme Court to declare government decisions unreasonable. On 1 January 2024, the court ruled, by a narrow 8-to-7 majority, that the Knesset law blocking the court's use of the "reasonableness" doctrine was unconstitutional, overturning the law—thus self-validating, reasserting and reinforcing the court's own authority to use the "reasonableness" standard, at its discretion, to review and overturn Knesset-passed laws. At the same time, by a broad 12–3 majority, the court ruled that it had the right to review any Knesset-passed Basic Law, and decide on its constitutional legitimacy, so as to "intervene in those rare and exceptional cases wherein the Knesset exceeds its Constitutive authority." The rulings were seen as a major defeat for Netanyahu and Levin.

From 2023 until 2025, Justice Minister Levin had blocked the accession of Amit as permanent president who was nominated based on the long-standing seniority-based convention, arguing he possesses discretion regarding the committee's convening, the identity of the candidates to be presented for a vote, and the timing of such a vote, but was forced to call a vote following a unanimous High Court decision although also seen as a part of the judicial reform attempt. Amit was appointed Chief Justice on 26 January 2025, and sworn in on 13 February 2025 by Israeli president Isaac Herzog with Levin boycotting the inauguration and vowing to refuse to meet Amit.

A draft of a new judicial reform was presented on 9 January 2025 as a “compromise” between Levin and Foreign Minister Gideon Sa’ar. According to the proposal, the majority necessary for high court appointments will be five out of nine, instead of seven. However, every High Court appointment will require the agreement of at least one representative from the opposition and one from the government. Appointments to other judicial positions will require the approval of one member of the government, one from the opposition, and one judge. The proposal also included a mechanism to prevent a deadlock in Supreme Court appointments. If a year passes with two vacancies, the government and opposition will each propose three candidates, out of which the other side must choose one. The proposal was passed and will apply as a law beginning with the next Knesset after the elections in 2026.

== Architecture ==
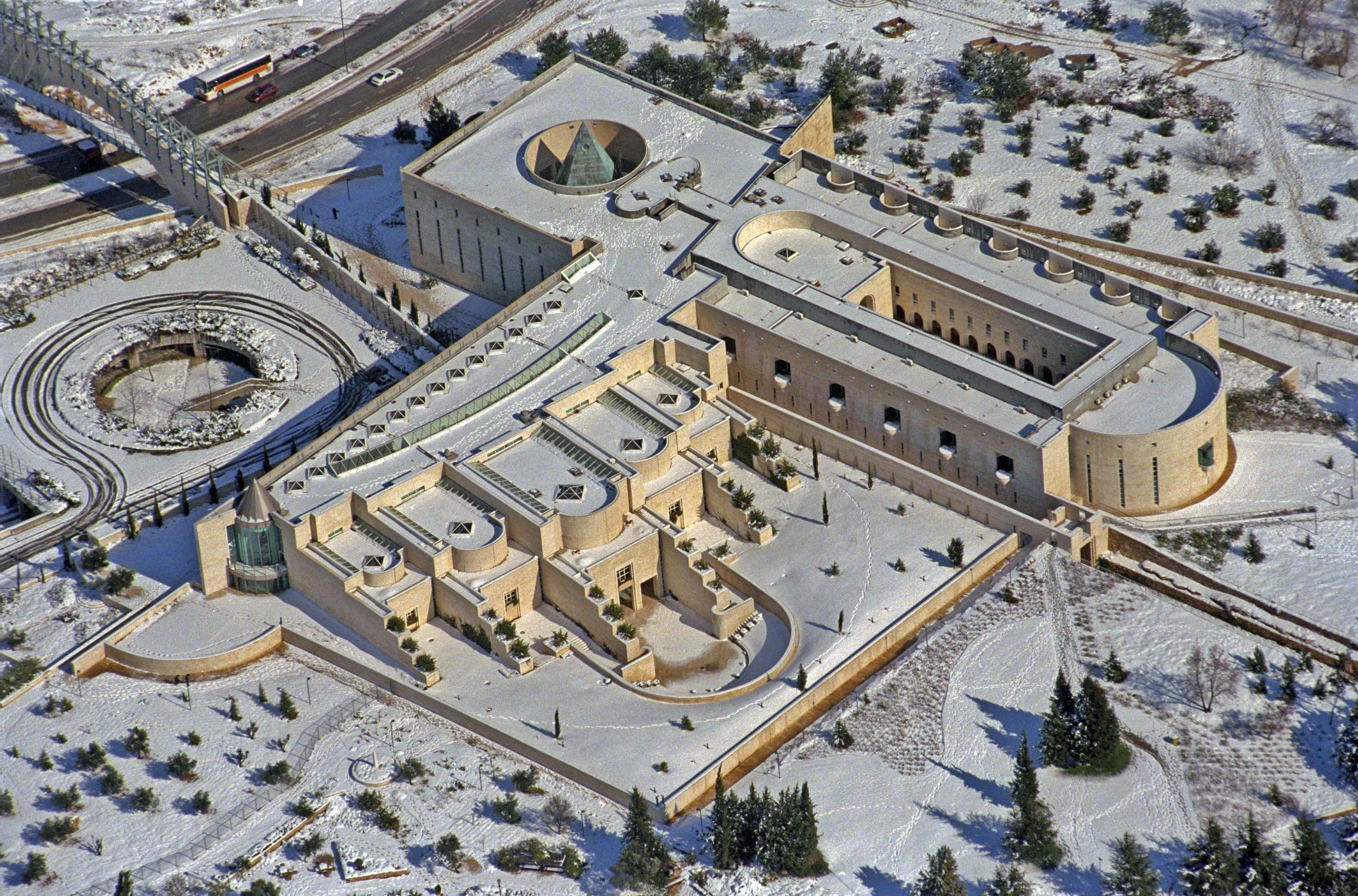
An aerial photo of the Supreme Court building covered in snow

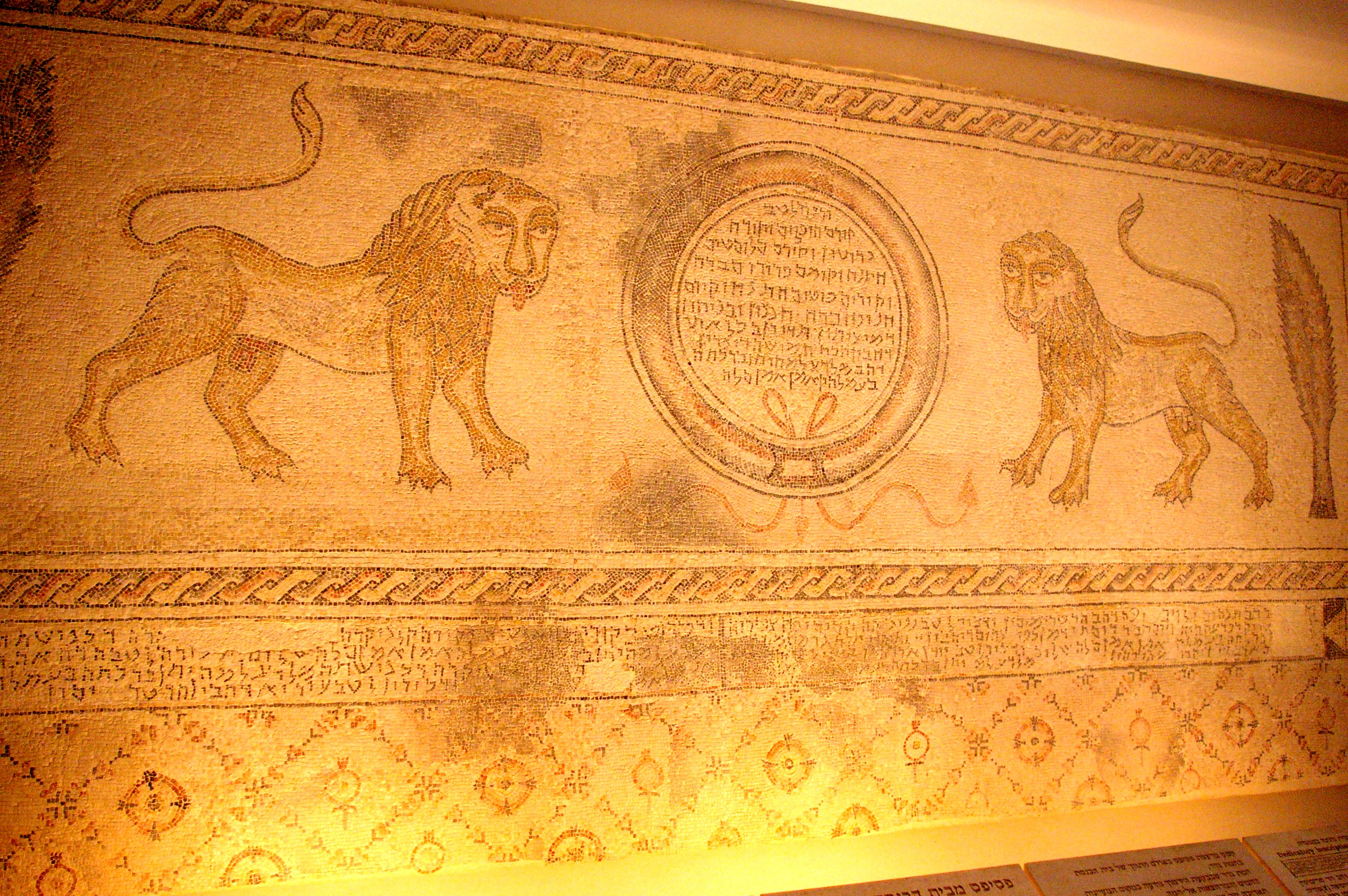
Mosaic pavement recovered from the ancient Hamat Gader synagogue

The building was donated to Israel by the Jewish philanthropist Dorothy de Rothschild. The letter de Rothschild wrote to Prime Minister Shimon Peres expressing her intention to donate a new building for the Supreme Court is displayed outside the President's Chamber.

It was designed by Ram Karmi and Ada Karmi-Melamede and opened in 1992. According to the critic Ran Shechori, the building is a "serious attempt to come to grips with the local building tradition". He writes that,

It makes rich and wide-ranging references to the whole lexicon of Eretz-Israel building over the centuries, starting with Herodian structures, through the Hellenistic tomb of Absalom, the Crusaders, Greek Orthodox monasteries, and up to the British Mandate period. This outpouring is organized in a complex, almost baroque structure, built out of contrasts light-shade, narrow-wide, open-closed, stone-plaster, straight-round, and a profusion of existential experiences.

Paul Goldberger of The New York Times calls it "Israel's finest public building", achieving "a remarkable and exhilarating balance between the concerns of daily life and the symbolism of the ages." He notes the complexity of the design with its interrelated geometric patterns:

There is no clear front door and no simple pattern to the organization. The building cannot be described solely as long, or solely as rounded or as being arranged around a series of courtyards, though from certain angles, like the elephant described by the blind man, it could be thought to be any one of these. The structure, in fact, consists of three main sections: a square library wing within which is set a round courtyard containing a copper-clad pyramid, a rectangular administrative wing containing judges' chambers arrayed around a cloistered courtyard and a wing containing five courtrooms, all of which extend like fingers from a great main hall.

The building is a blend of enclosed and open spaces; old and new; lines and circles. Approaching the Supreme Court library, one enters the pyramid area, a large space that serves as a turning point before the entrance to the courtrooms. This serene space acts as the inner "gatehouse" of the Supreme Court building. The Pyramid was inspired by the Tomb of Zechariah and Tomb of Absalom in the Kidron Valley in Jerusalem. Natural light enters round windows at the apex of the pyramid, forming circles of sunlight on the inside walls and on the floor.

== See also ==
- Israeli Supreme Court opinions on the West Bank Barrier
- 2023 Israeli judicial reform
