= Yaakov Neeman =

Israeli politician (1939–2017)

- יעקב נאמן
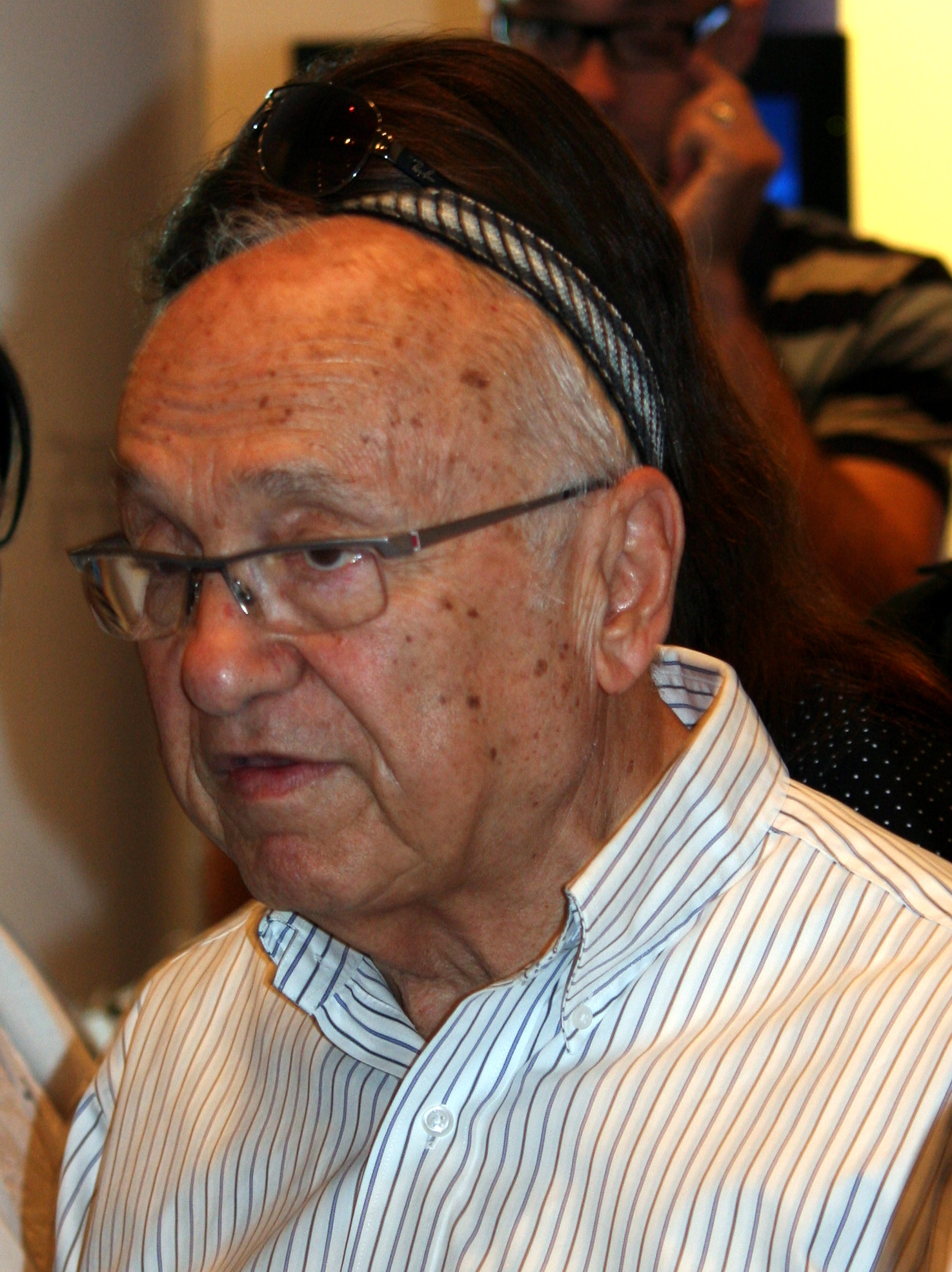

Ministerial roles
- 1996: Minister of Justice
- 1997–1998: Minister of Finance
- 2009–2013: Minister of Justice

Personal details
- Born: 16 September 1939 Tel Aviv, Mandatory Palestine
- Died: 1 January 2017 (aged 77) Jerusalem, Israel

Yaakov Israel Neeman (Hebrew: יעקב ישראל נאמן; 16 September 1939 – 1 January 2017) was an Israeli lawyer who served as Minister of Justice and Minister of Finance, although he was never a member of the Knesset.

== Biography ==
Neeman was born to a religious Zionist family in Tel Aviv during the Mandate era. He was educated at the Midrashiat Noam high-school yeshiva and completed his military service in the Golani Brigade. He went on to study law at Hebrew University of Jerusalem, earning a LL.B in 1964. In 1965, he earned a LL.M from New York University, and in 1968, a LL.D. After returning to Israel, in 1972 he founded the law firm Herzog, Fox & Ne'eman, along with future president of Israel Chaim Herzog.

Neeman was appointed Director General of the Finance Ministry in 1979, serving until 1981. In June 1996 he was appointed to the Israeli cabinet as Minister of Justice by Prime Minister, Binyamin Netanyahu, despite not being a member of the Knesset. Two months later he resigned from the cabinet, after Attorney General Michael Ben-Yair opened a criminal investigation into allegations that Neeman had tried to suborn a witness in the trial of MK Aryeh Deri. Neeman was eventually cleared of the charges and returned to the cabinet in July 1997 as Minister of Finance until the end of the Netanyahu premiership at the 1999 elections.

In late March 2009, following Netanyahu's return to power as Prime Minister of Israel, Neeman was again appointed as Justice Minister.

Neeman resided in Jerusalem in the Talbiya section. He is survived by his wife and six children.

== Committee Membership ==
Neeman has chaired or been a member of numerous national and international committees, including the executive committee of Bar-Ilan University, the public committee appointed by the Speaker of the Knesset to determine salaries and other payments to government officials, the public committee appointed by the cabinet for the Drafting of the Constitution, the Public Committee on Educational Centers, the Public Committee on Privatisation Issues of El Al, the board of governors of Bank of Israel, the Committee for the Conversion Law, the National Committee for the Identification of Fallen Soldiers in Times of Emergency, Israel Atomic Energy Committee and the Central Committee of the World Bank.

== Political views ==
On 8 December 2009, while serving as the Minister of Justice, Ne'eman was reported as saying that he believed that Halakha should gradually be made binding law in Israel, with the ultimate goal of making Israel a Halakhic state. But he later denied this, emphasizing that "the Knesset is the legislator in Israel, and the interpretation of its laws is determined by the [civil] courts." He said that he advocated the use of religious courts only in an auxiliary role, to "resolve financial disputes in accordance with the principles of Jewish law. The court system in Israel is backed up, and therefore, cases should be transferred to an alternative system."
