= 2023 Israeli judicial reform =

Legislation limiting judiciary independence

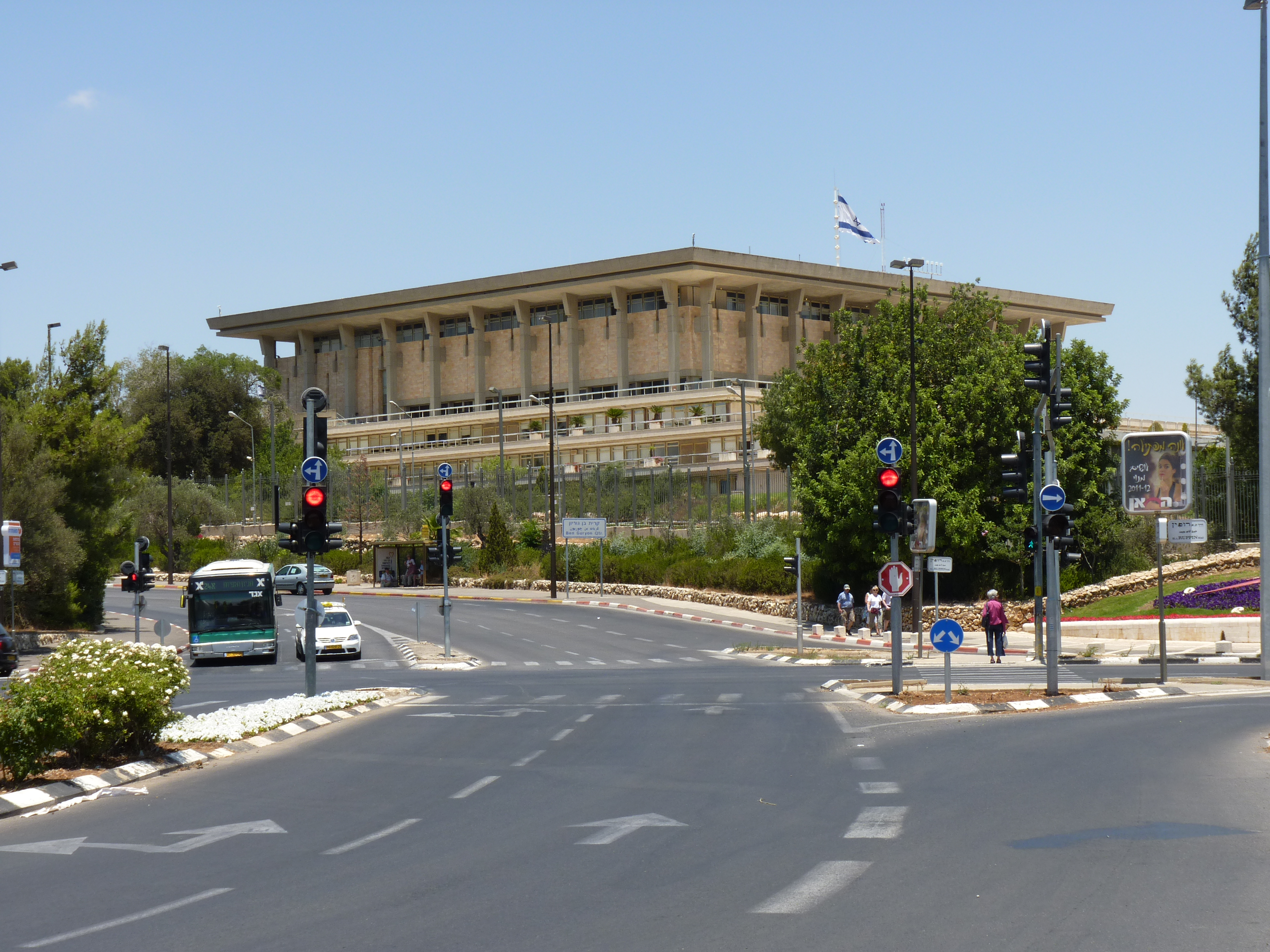

Knesset
- Considered by: 25th Knesset

Related legislation
- Basic Law: The Judiciary; Basic Law: Human Dignity and Liberty
- Status: Blocked

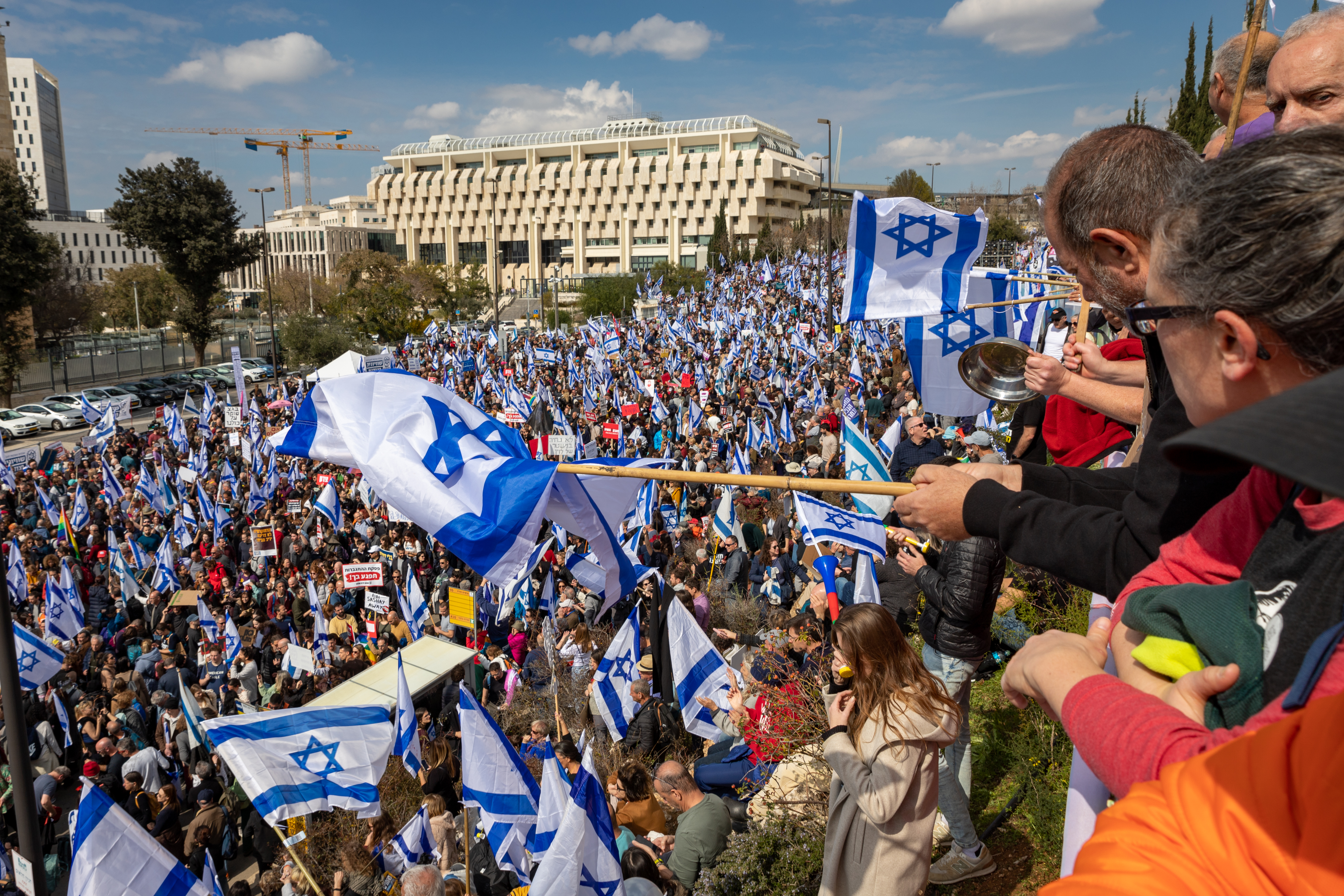
Demonstrators against the judicial reform in Jerusalem, 13 February 2023

The 2023 Israeli judicial reform is a set of five changes to the judicial system and the balance of powers in Israel that were proposed in January 2023. The intent of the measures is to curb the judiciary's influence over lawmaking and public policy by limiting the Supreme Court's power to exercise judicial review, granting the government control over judicial appointments and limiting the authority of its legal advisors. The effort was led by Yariv Levin, the deputy prime minister and minister of justice, and Simcha Rothman, the chair of the Knesset's Constitution, Law and Justice Committee.

The Supreme Court has, for several decades, assumed the right to declare Knesset legislation unconstitutional. The reform would permit the Knesset to override such a ruling by reintroducing the legislation and approving it with a majority of Knesset members. The reform would additionally diminish the ability of courts to conduct judicial review of the Basic Laws and change the makeup of the Judicial Selection Committee, so that control over the appointment of judges is effectively given to the government.

Levin and the ruling government coalition have stated that the above is the first step in their judicial reform, and that additional steps are planned, including:

- changing the appointment process of legal advisors to government ministries, such that they are appointed and dismissed by the ministers;
- making the legal advisers' legal advice a recommendation, rather than binding on the ministers; and
- making them subordinate directly to the ministers, rather than to the Justice Ministry's professional oversight.

Prime Minister Benjamin Netanyahu maintains that the reform is necessary because the judiciary has too much control over public policy, and a better balance is needed between democratically elected legislators and the judiciary.

However, Netanyahu has been barred from actively taking part in the process of the judicial reform by the attorney general, due to a conflict of interest stemming from his ongoing corruption trial.

The coalition is also advancing a number of other bills concerning Israel's judicial system and the balance of powers, including:

- reforms to widen the authority of the Rabbinical Court, allowing them to act as arbitrators in civil matters using religious law, if both parties consent;
- bills limiting the ability to call for a no-confidence vote and other methods for dissolving a sitting Knesset;
- bills prohibiting criminal proceedings against sitting Prime Ministers (which could free the current PM, Netanyahu, from the corruption charges currently pending against him); and
- bills permitting key public service positions to be positions of trust, appointed by politicians, rather than professional appointments.

The proposed reform has sparked significant backlash, as well as some support, both inside and outside of Israel. Opposition leaders and activists accused the government of undermining established norms of checks and balances and attempting to seize absolute power, with some arguing the reform amounts to an attempt at regime change. Israeli President Isaac Herzog has called for the reforms to be halted to allow for a wider consultative process, and the president of the Supreme Court and the attorney general have attested to the reform's illegalities. Protests against the reform escalated in Israel shortly after its introduction, as did significant concern among some in the international community.

On 27 March 2023, after public protests and general strikes, Netanyahu announced a pause in the reform process to allow for dialogue with opposition parties. However, negotiations aimed at reaching a compromise collapsed in June, and the government resumed its plans to unilaterally pass parts of the legislation. On 24 July 2023, the Knesset passed a bill that curbs the power of the Supreme Court to declare government decisions unreasonable; on 1 January 2024, the Supreme Court struck the bill down. On 27 March 2025, the Knesset passed a bill to change the makeup of the Judicial Selection Committee.

== Background ==
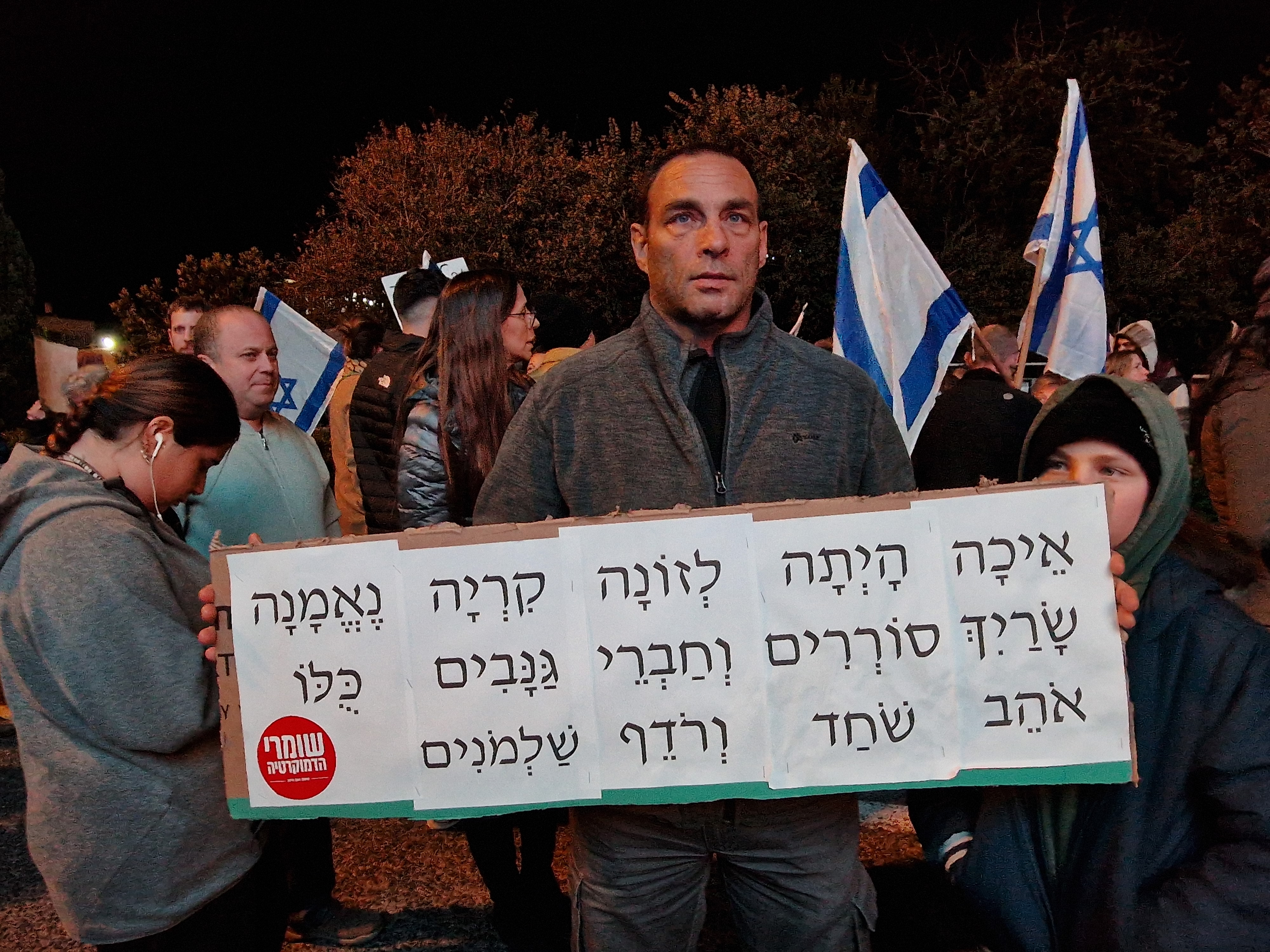
Demonstrators against the judicial reform in Haifa, 11 January 2023. The protester's sign reads a quote from the Hebrew Bible: "How is the faithful city become an harlot! Thy princes are rebellious, and companions of thieves: every one loveth gifts, and followeth after rewards." (Isaiah 1:21–23)

=== Israeli Supreme Court and judicial review ===
All legislation, government orders, and administrative actions of state bodies are subject to judicial review by the Supreme Court of Israel, which has as of several decades ago assumed the power to strike down legislation and reverse executive decisions it determines to be in violation of Israel's Basic Laws.

This role of the Supreme Court in Israel has been seen by those who oppose the reform as crucial for the protection of human rights in light of its otherwise weak system of checks and balances, which lacks a bicameral legislative system, a president with executive powers, a federal government, regional elections, membership in a regional supra-governmental organization, or acceptance of the International Court of Justice's authority.

The exercise of these powers by the court has often sparked controversy within Israel, usually among right-wing politicians and their supporters. Many of the court's rulings, particularly those limiting the expansion of Israeli settlements in the occupied West Bank, as well as those affecting ultra-Orthodox autonomy and way of life have sparked resentment among ultra-Orthodox and Religious Zionist politicians, many of whom have accused the court of engaging in judicial activism in favor of left-wing causes.

=== 1992 Constitutional Revolution and its discontents ===
Between 1992 and 1999, Supreme Court Justice Aharon Barak developed a doctrine in a series of rulings, the guiding principle of which is the introduction of human rights indirectly to private law. This is done with the help of concepts such as "good faith", "public policy" or "violation of legal duty" that the judges apply in their rulings. The proponents of judicial reform claim that the problem is that the concepts depend on the judge who interprets them, resulting in legal uncertainty, opening private and government action to judicial review according to the dictates of the judge's conscience and not necessarily according to the laws established by the legislature.

=== 2018–2022 Israeli political crisis and 2022 legislative election ===
Within the context of the 2018–2022 Israeli political crisis, the 2022 legislative election was the fifth Knesset election in nearly four years, as no party had been able to form a stable coalition government since 2019. In the election, the right-wing bloc won a majority of seats in the Knesset, with far-right elements such as the Religious Zionist Party making record-breaking gains.

Following the election, Likud leader and former Prime Minister Benjamin Netanyahu formed the thirty-seventh government of Israel, assigning many powerful positions in the new government to previously marginalized far-right politicians who had long advocated policies that conflicted with many of the supreme court's precedents and have sought to curtail its powers. Among the incoming government's official policy guidelines was a commitment to judicial reform.

== Legislative history ==
The Supreme Court of Israel struck down the law on 1 January 2024. HCJ 5658/23 Movement for Quality Government in Israel v. Knesset (2024).

On 4 January 2023, newly appointed Justice Minister Yariv Levin announced his intention to overhaul Israel's judiciary. On 11 January, Levin published a draft of his proposed changes, which included the following changes to the judiciary, executive and legislative processes and functions:

1. Judicial selection — The committee which is responsible for recommending the appointment of judges currently consists of serving judges, representatives of the Israel Bar Association, Knesset members and government ministers, and is composed as such that agreement is required between these different groups. The proposed changes seek to change the composition of the committee, giving a majority of votes to the government and thus giving the government control over the selection and dismissal of all judges, including of the Supreme Court.
2. Judicial review — The proposed changes seek to curb judicial review over legislation, including by explicitly legislating against the Supreme Court's exercise of judicial review of Basic Laws, and requiring a full bench of Supreme Court justices to preside over any case in which the legality of regular legislation passed by the Knesset is evaluated, and 80% of them to rule for invalidation of such legislation.
3. Knesset override — The proposed changes seek to allow the Knesset to overrule a decision by the Supreme Court on the legality of legislation, where the Knesset votes with a majority (of 61, out of 120 Knesset members) against the court decision.
4. Legal advisers to government ministries — The proposed changes seek to reclassify ministry legal advisers from independent authorities, subject to the professional oversight of the Justice Ministry, to politically selected counsel whose opinions are explicitly non-binding upon the government and its ministers, thus allowing ministers to individually select and dismiss their legal advisors and decide whether or not to adhere to legal advice.
5. Reasonableness — The proposed changes seek to limit the scope of judicial review of governmental and administrative decisions, by legislating against the concept of 'reasonableness'. This would preclude the courts from hearing petitions or appeals against governmental and administrative decisions on the basis that such decisions are 'unreasonable'.

On 24 July 2023, the Knesset passed the law curbing judicial review of reasonableness.

=== HCJ 5658/23 Movement for Quality Government in Israel v. Knesset (2024) ===
Movement for Quality Government in Israel v. Knesset
- Court: Supreme Court of Israel
- Started: 12 September 2023
- Decided: 1 January 2024
- Citation: HCJ 5658/23

Court membership
- Judges sitting: Esther Hayut (Translated opinion); Uzi Vogelman; Yitzhak Amit; Noam Sohlberg; Daphne Barak-Erez; Anat Baron; David Mintz; Yosef Elron; Yael Willner; Ofer Grosskopf; Alex Stein; Gila Canfy-Steinitz; Khaled Kabub; Yechiel Kasher; Ruth Ronnen

Case opinions
- Concurrence: 8
- Dissent: 7

On 12 September 2023, for the first time in its history, the court heard the case with all 15 justices sitting. At the end of December 2023, Israeli television station Keshet 12 reported the ruling in advance based on a leaked draft of the decision. The bill was struck down by the Supreme Court, in its role as the High Court of Justice, on 1 January 2024 by a vote of 8–7. The justices also ruled 12–3 that the court has the power to overturn Basic Laws.

Each justice wrote their own opinion. Justice Hayut noted Israel's "fragile, lacking system of checks and balances" in finding that the reform was unreasonable; Amit echoed the "heavy democratic deficit in Israel", saying that "such a cancellation of the reasonableness doctrine has much greater weight here than in other countries". Justice Stein agreed in upholding the court's ability to strike down laws, writing that "the Knesset never received the authority to pass any law it pleased", but voted with the minority in favor of the proposed reform, finding that it "violates no constitutional norm". Sohlberg, meanwhile, wrote that "frail legal constructs" did not mean the court could overrule the Knesset.

== Proposed changes ==
=== Judicial selection ===
==== Current system ====
The Judicial Selection Committee is composed of nine members. Three of them are Supreme Court judges, two are representatives of the Bar Association, two are Knesset members and two are ministers. Selection of judges to all courts require a simple majority of the committee, but selection of Supreme Court judges require the approval of seven out of the nine members on the committee, granting essentially veto powers to either the three judges or the representatives of the ruling parliamentary coalition.

According to the Israel Democracy Institute, the effect of the current system is one of consensus, in that "the selection of Supreme Court justices has mandated the consent of the politicians on the [Committee], because a majority of seven of its nine members must support a successful candidate. By the same token, the politicians cannot select judges without the agreement of the justices on the committee. This principle has generally produced a consensus on a slate of new justices." In contrast, those who view the current Supreme Court as left-leaning, including Minister of Justice Yariv Levin and Prime Minister Netanyahu, state that this 'consensus' is one-sided: When a right-wing government is in place, its members must compromise with the allegedly left-leaning committee members (the three Supreme Court justices and the Bar representatives who, it is claimed by Levin, vote as a block), but when a left-wing government is in charge, supposedly no such consensus is needed. They point to the recent appointment of 61 judges in one sitting of the committee, under the previous center-left government, with no effective way for the opposition to object.

==== Proposed system ====
According to the amendments proposed to the Judiciary Basic Law by Justice Minister, Yariv Levin, the Judicial Selection Committee's composition will be changed to give greater weight to the legislative and executive branches of government. The committee will consist of eleven members, namely the Minister of Justice who will serve as the Committee Chairman, two Ministers designated by the government, the Chairman of the Knesset Constitution, Law and Justice Committee, the Chairman of the Knesset State Control Committee, the Chairman of the Knesset Committee, the President of the Supreme Court, two other judges of the Supreme Court who will be chosen from their fellow judges, and two public representatives chosen by the Minister of Justice, one of them being a lawyer. As a result, since the committee chairmen are usually (though not always) selected from the ranks of the ruling coalition, the government could have complete control over the appointment and dismissal of judges, with seven representatives on the Committee out of eleven members in total.

==== Arguments in favor of the reform ====
Arguments put forward to justify this change include the following:

- As things stand, members who are not publicly elected officials — the judges and lawyers — have a majority in the committee, and it is impossible to appoint a judge of whom they do not approve to any judicature. Furthermore, it is alleged that the Supreme Court's representatives generally vote in a coordinated manner, and this causes the judiciary's representatives to negotiate with the other Committee members as one unit, with increased negotiating power.
- Comparatively, focusing exclusively on the Supreme Court, Israeli judicial selection is exceptional when contrasted with other democratic countries. A 2019 study of judicial appointments to constitutional courts of the 36 OECD countries (supreme courts or constitutional courts) found that 24 out of 36 countries surveyed appoint their judges in a system that grants the power to elected officials exclusively. For example, in the United States, supreme court judges are appointed by the president, with the confirmation of the Senate; in Germany, constitutional court judges are appointed by both chambers of the legislature; in France, the judges of the constitutional council are appointed by the President and both houses of representatives in equal proportion, and alongside them serve former state presidents; in Japan, the selection is controlled by the government subject to ratification through a referendum. This system of exclusive appointment of judges by the elected officials is common to Canada, Australia, New Zealand, Belgium, Switzerland, Austria, Ireland, the Netherlands, Denmark, Sweden, Iceland, Finland, Norway and more. It must be stated that in Israel, such a system was used during the state's early years and that the judges that established the Supreme Court were appointed by the government with the Knesset's approval.
- Only four OECD member states, besides Israel, appoint their constitutional court judges without giving the elected officials the ability to appoint the judges: Turkey, Greece, the UK and Luxembourg. However, the UK and Luxembourg are distinct from Israel and most other states in that their judges cannot void parliament's laws, and that the supremacy of the public's values are attained by legislative supremacy. From this, of the 36 OECD countries, Israel's sole companions in giving a veto to non-elected officials over judicial appointed to the highest tribunal authorized to strike down parliament's laws, are Greece and Turkey.
- Of the 50 states that compose the United States, in 22 states, the supreme court judges are elected directly by voting ballot; in another 15 states, the appointments are ratified in a direct vote; four states elect their judges through the public officials and eight states appoint by committees in which the majority of the members are appointed by elected officials.

==== Arguments against the reform ====
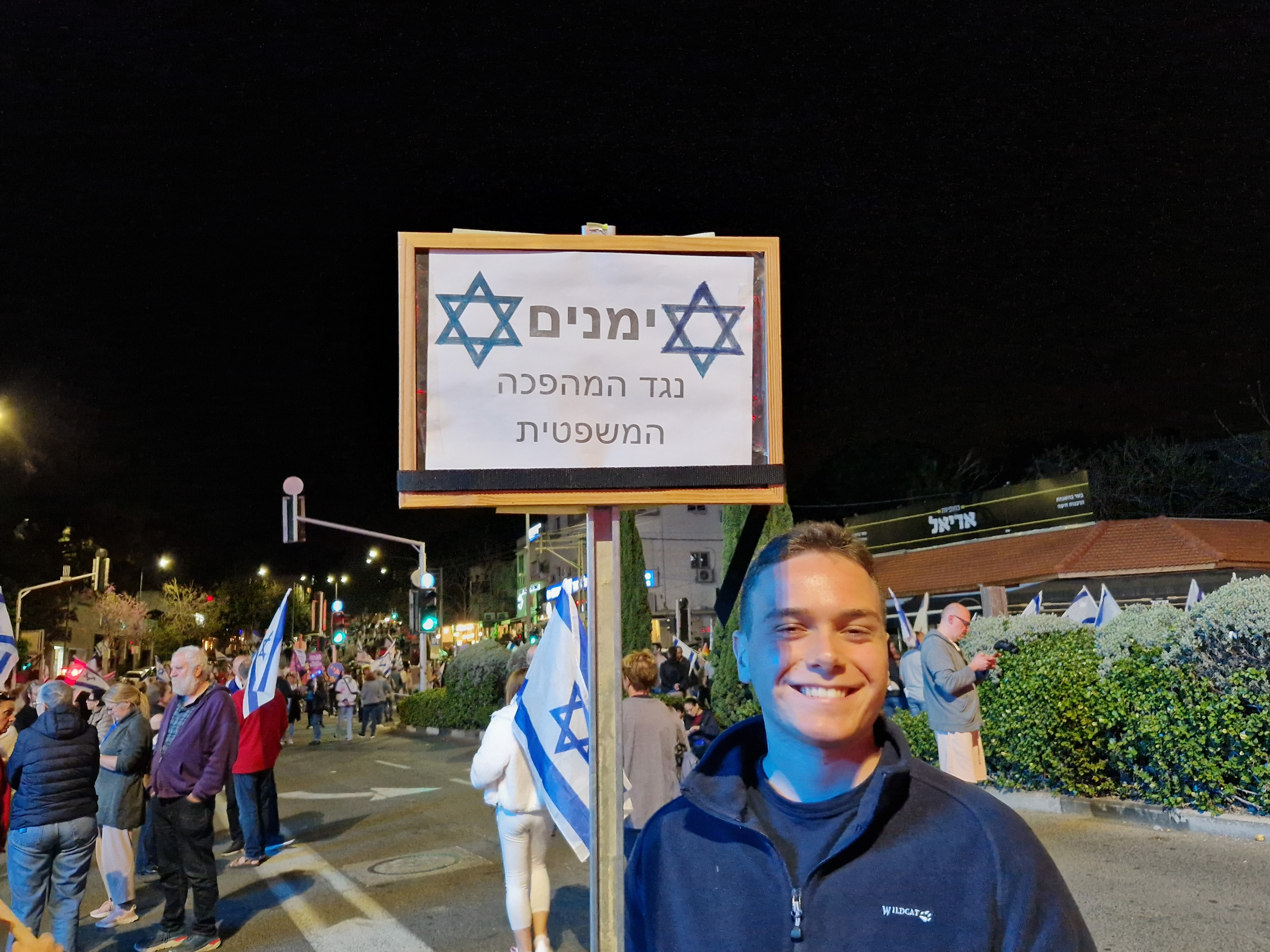
A sign at a demonstration in Haifa, saying "Right-wingers against the legal revolution", 8 April 2023

The Kohelet Policy Forum study used to underpin most of the above arguments has been strongly criticized as being selective in its reliance on foreign legal systems. For example:

- While 31 of the 36 countries in the study have public representatives selecting the judges, in 24 of them, judges are selected in consultation with the judicial system and upon its recommendation.
- Further, while in most of these countries such a recommendation carries no legal force, in practice it is binding, as the public representatives listen to the judges' recommendations and act upon them. As noted in a study, "the political culture in these countries is such that public representatives select the judges with the consent and blessing of the judicial system — a political culture completely different than that in Israel."
- The same study notes: "The other developed countries, in which there is no appreciable involvement of the justice system in judicial selection, are almost all countries with constitutions. Some have a federal structure of several states, each with its own additional supreme court protecting the residents of that federal state. Most have bicameral legislatures not necessarily controlled by the party controlling the executive branch, and so the government's power is decentralized. Usually judicial selection requires the consent of the government as well as both houses of parliament, and almost always the choice in the legislative chambers requires a large majority (usually two thirds of the votes, and even an absolute majority). In other words, the coalition, which does not rule alone and cannot appoint judges on its own, needs the consent of the opposition as well. None of this exists in Israel, and that completely changes the picture."
- The proposed changes would also grant the government complete control in appointing judges to all courts other than the Supreme Court. The justification for changing the manner of appointing judges to courts other than the Supreme Court is unclear.

In addition, the Knesset's Research Unit, in a survey, also presented a very different picture, quoting an OECD report arguing that on the purposes promoted by most democracies is to prevent any single power control over judicial appointment of constitutional court justices.

The Israeli Law Professors Forum for Democracy, comprising over 100 legal experts and academics in Israel, has published a number of position papers analyzing these reforms, concluding that their implementation would undermine the judiciary's "independence, subordinate the judiciary to the elected government, and render the separation of powers in Israel an empty shell".

According to Elise Brezis, director of the Azrieli Center for Economic Policy at Bar-Ilan University, the Kohelet Policy Forum did not attempt to assess the impact their plan will have on the Israeli economy. She compared the plan to a "pretty architectural sketch with no engineering assessment."

=== Government legal advisors ===
The coalition has published a draft bill to reclassify ministry legal advisers from independent authorities to politically selected counsel whose opinions are explicitly non-binding upon the government and its ministers. The draft bill determines that "legal advice given to the government" or to "the prime minister and all government ministers, will not obligate it or be able to alter its legal position", and that the cabinet and its ministers are "authorized to reject legal advice and operate against it." This would substantially change the system which has been in place till today, whereby each ministry's legal adviser falls under the aegis of the attorney general to preserve their independence from political influence, and their advice is binding upon ministries.

The previous Attorney General, Avichai Mandelblit, has formerly criticized past attempts to pass such laws, stating that "letting ministers appoint legal advisers — instead of the current system of election through public tender — would politicize the position and harm the integrity of Israeli democracy's 'gatekeepers.'"

Yedidia Stern, former dean of the Law Faculty at Bar-Ilan University, has criticized the bill, explaining that a public legal advisor has duties to both "the government ministry to which he is appointed, and the public. In addition to legal advice, an attorney in the public service is also responsible for safeguarding the rule of law, for the benefit of us all. This dual role justifies dual input — by the minister and by the Attorney General — in the selection of ministry legal advisors."

Guy Lurie of the Israel Democracy Institute has argued that "In order to safeguard the legality of government actions and prevent corruption, the legal advisors must be independent when issuing their legal opinions, and professionally subordinate to the Attorney General, rather than to the minister."

=== Constitutional review ===
The reform proposes to codify the Supreme Court's power of judicial review, which to date has not been set in legislation. In the face of the absence of such legislation, following the 1992 passing of the Human Dignity and Liberty Basic Law the Supreme Court has delineated such power to itself, including in a landmark decision, the 1995 Mizrahi Bank decision, similar to the US Supreme Court's 1803 decision in Marbury v. Madison.

The bill approved by the Constitution, Law and Justice Committee on 13 February 2023, explicitly states "the non-justiciability of basic laws, stipulating that a [court] holding adjudication power by law, including the Supreme Court, will not address, directly or indirectly, a question regarding the validity of a basic law, and no ruling on such a matter will be valid."

The government has also proposed that if the Knesset passes a regular law that contradicts existing Basic Laws, it will not be considered automatically void, and only the Supreme Court, with a full quorum of all its judges (excluding those precluded from participating for over 30 days from the day that the matter is to be decided) can preside over the law's nullification. Proponents of the change argue that this is in order to guarantee a comprehensive discussion with the full range of views in the Supreme Court, as well as to prevent the discussion from being influenced by the supposed haphazard nature of the panel. It is further proposed that the majority needed to nullify a law is a majority of eighty percent of the total judges, with the argument being that the nullification of a law passed by an elected government should be exceptional (even if it contradicts existing Basic Laws), and if several judges do not decide to nullify the newer contradicting law, the will of the elected government should prevail.

The proposed legislation argues that as the Basic Laws are Israel's supreme legal norms, the Court derives its power of judicial review from the Basic Laws themselves and thus cannot review or strike down the Basic Laws themselves. The proposal seeks to deny judicial review over Basic Laws, in order to guarantee the Supreme Court's subjection to the rule of name and to the source of democratic authority.

Proponents of this change argue that this is similar to the majority of Western countries in which there is no judicial review over constitutional norms. The legal advisor to the Committee through which this reform is being progressed published an opinion stating he had found no precedent in any democratic country for judicial review over legislation to require a unanimous decision of every judge on the relevant court.

=== Override clause ===
Another proposal is to allow the Knesset to reject the interpretation given by the Supreme Court to a Basic Law and to override a Supreme Court decision nullifying a law. According to the proposal, the Knesset will be able to, under specific conditions, override a judicial decision nullifying a law. Proponents argue that the proposed override clause is not to exempt the Knesset from its commitments to constitutional values, but rather to give the legislators the ability to decide differently than the court.

In one form of the proposal, it is proposed that should the Supreme Court nullify a law in full consensus of all judges, the Knesset shall not be able to pass an override law during its term. However, if the Supreme Court decision nullifying primary legislation was not taken in full consensus, it is proposed to allow the Knesset to override the Supreme Court decision nullifying the law with a majority of 61 Knesset members, as long as the law states explicitly that the law will be valid notwithstanding the Supreme Court's ruling. The override will remain valid for the term of the next Knesset, which may review it anew. As such, it is stated that the force of the override is limited to four years or until the end of the first year of the term of a new Knesset after the Knesset that passed the override law, according to the later event.

It is further proposed that the Knesset will be able to override the judgement to nullify a law given in full consensus. However, this is on condition that the Knesset that passes the override is a different Knesset than that which passed the nullified law, therefore expressing two Knessets' support for a different value framework than that of the Supreme Court. In such a case, as well as in a case when a regular override is passed by two Knessets, the override will be permanent.

Proponents argue that similar clauses exist in Canada, Finland and the Australian state of Victoria. However, studies have pointed out the differences between Israel's system and these countries which affect the impact of such clauses on the political system. For example, a study conducted by Amichai Cohen of 66 democracies to identify and analyze the structural-formal restraints placed on the political branch concluded that "without granting the judicial branch the authority to oversee the other branches, Israel will become the sole democracy of significant size in which one elected authority wields practically unlimited power."

This proposal has been criticized for giving too much power to the Knesset, far beyond the power wielded by other executive and legislature bodies in Western countries. For example, the Israel Democracy Institute has stated that an "override clause would give a Knesset majority absolute power to enact laws, notwithstanding the stipulations of the Basic Laws. By doing so, it would severely curtail the Supreme Court's authority of constitutional review of laws passed by the Knesset, which is controlled by the Government (the executive branch) that enjoys a political majority. Every country has checks and balances that set limits on the power of the political majority. In Israel, however, the Supreme Court is the sole balancing mechanism."

=== Abolition of "unreasonableness" grounds ===
==== Arguments in favor of the reform ====
The reform will abolish the use of "unreasonableness" as grounds for review of administrative decisions. Although unreasonableness has its origins in English jurisprudence, the court has expanded on this doctrine since Israel's founding in 1948. Some have claimed that the courts' definition of the grounds of reasonableness is unique globally. An unreasonable administrative action has been defined as a situation in which the administrative authority failed to give proper weight to all relevant considerations which formed the basis of the administrative decision, and did not properly balance between all the relevant considerations, in accordance with their weight:

The only way to further the discussion about the substance of reasonableness is to recognize that reasonableness is neither a physical nor a metaphysical concept, but a normative one. Reasonableness means that one identifies the relevant considerations and then balances them according to their weight. Indeed, reasonableness is an evaluative process, not a descriptive process. It is not a concept that is defined by deductive logic. It is not merely rationality. A decision is reasonable if it was made by weighing the necessary considerations, including fundamental values in general and human rights in particular. Nothing is reasonable 'in itself'.

This expansive doctrine empowers the Supreme Court to strike down almost any administrative decision, even if it was taken by due legal authority. In an interview with Haaretz, former Supreme Court Justice Moshe Landau criticized the use of the "unreasonableness" doctrine:

The justices in the older court did not set themselves up as the teachers of the generation. We did not think that our task was to teach the public fundamental or deep values of private or public morality. This doesn't mean that we didn't pay attention to values. This doesn't mean that we didn't make value judgements. But we understood the limitations of the Court's jurisdiction. We made sure that what we ruled on regarding values flowed out of the issue brought before us [...] The judge is not the teacher of the generation and is not a philosopher-king. His task is much more modest: to be a faithful interpreter of the law. Of the public's will as expressed by the Knesset, as representative of the public. Therefore, I believe that the judge's wisdom requires him to be cautious, sensitive, with broad discretion and without hubris.

==== Arguments against the reform ====
Amir Fuchs, a lecturer in the Politics and Communication Department at the School of Government and Social Sciences at Hadassah Academic College, has argued in favor of the reasonableness doctrine, saying that "its purpose is to prevent the government from passing entirely arbitrary decisions; but it is certainly not intended to replace the decision-making powers of the government, with those of the court. Like all other administrative law standards (the rules of natural justice, and standards such as the ban on extraneous interests and the requirement to take all relevant considerations into account), it is meant to ensure that the government does not exceed the boundaries of its law-given authority."

Yedidia Stern, former dean of the Law Faculty at Bar Ilan University, has defended the reasonableness doctrine, stating that without it, "the members of the outgoing Knesset will have the power to make the final decision about who can run against them in the next election. Without judicial review they will be able to protect one another through the mechanism of parliamentary immunity."

Ruvi Ziegler, the programme director for Master of Laws in International Law, Human Rights and Advanced Legal Studies at the University of Reading, has written that "the plan would strip courts of their power to hold the Executive properly accountable for its administrative decisions. This means decisions made by public authorities from the police to the tax authority, would no longer need to be considered "reasonable" to be accepted in judicial review. In practical terms this means anyone could be denied a license, a benefit, a service without being given suitable reasons and without having an effective remedy. The "reasonableness" standard, which is a key part of British legal heritage, is critical for good governance and must be maintained in the Israeli setting as well."

=== Status of the Attorney-General ===
According to the Government Basic Law Amendment proposed by Knesset Member Simcha Rothman, the government and ministers will be authorized to determine its legal position in any matter. Furthermore, they will be entitled to accept or reject the Attorney-General's advice. Currently, according to Supreme Court rulings, the Attorney-General's legal opinion is considered to reflect, from the point of view of the government, the current legal status, as long as the court does not rule otherwise.

The government will also be entitled to determine its position that will be presented in court. The government will be entitled to private representation should the Attorney-General refuse to represent its position. Currently, if the Attorney-General refuses to defend the government's position or presents another position, the Attorney General may decline to defend the government's action in court, and if the division of opinions is based on a legitimate interpretative conflict, the Attorney General may grant the government recourse to different legal representation.

The position of binding advice and representational monopoly in Israel is exceptional and even unique by global standards. As Dr. Eitan Levontin describes, "there is no such thing, to the best of my understanding, in any other place. The legal situation in Israel is not a minority opinion, but rather a single opinion, and it seems to me that a chasm — not just a disagreement — lies between it and the legal situation in any comparable country." By contrast, in the UK, the US, Canada and Germany, the AG — or the parallel figure — is a political role similar to the minister, and in some countries is actually a government minister. As such, they have no power to bind the government to their positions; the government can act in oppositions to their positions; the government is authorized to dictate to the AG the position to present before courts; and he is forbidden to put together legal opinions absent government request.

The position of the Attorney General in Israel can only be understood against the background of the particular history of this position in Israel and against the background of Israel's regime, with its relatively weak system of checks and balances. For example, in a statement published by tens of Canadian legal experts, including former Supreme Court Chief Justice Beverley McLachlin and other former Justices of the Supreme Court, the differences between Israel and Canada's political systems were discussed, with the conclusion that "Israel's system of government differs from that of other democracies, like Canada's, in its exceptional concentration of political power. Other democracies have a suite of mechanisms that distribute or moderate the exercise of political power."

== Reactions ==
=== National ===
The government's proposed reforms have sparked intense controversy in Israel. Opposition leaders, activists, retired senior public servants, retired officials of the security services, executives of Israel's banks and financial institutions, leading business figures, economists and jurists have harshly criticized the proposed changes, arguing they will undermine judicial independence and effectively grant the government unchecked power.

The proposed reforms have led to large-scale protests, with opposition parties cooperating with grassroots activists to coordinate marches, strikes and demonstrations. The protesters include reservists in Israel's security services, with some stating that they will not report for reserve duty while the proposed changes to the judicial system are being progressed through legislation. They also include members of Israel's financial and tech sectors.

The reforms have received support from some academics, with 120 professors and retired politicians expressing their support. It has also received support from religious Zionist rabbis and members of the political right, who have staged counter-protests in response to opposition demonstrations.

=== International ===
International legal figures, economists and politicians have expressed concern over the reforms, as have Jewish organizations internationally, including in the United Kingdom, the United States and Australia. US President Joe Biden and German Foreign Minister Annalena Baerbock have stated their concern regarding the reforms. Some jurists have expressed support for the reforms.

A 2023 survey produced by Plus61J Media, analysed by Professor Andrew Markus at Melbourne's Monash University and published in The Jewish Independent publication found that 74% of Australian Jews disagreed that the reforms would be good for Israel (with 14% tending to disagree and 60% strongly disagreeing), while only 14% agreed that they were good (8% tending to agree and 6% strongly agreeing). 76% reported having followed the issue closely (35% "a lot" and 41% "quite a lot"), while 22% reported having done so "a little" and just 2% "not at all".

=== Connection to the Israeli–Palestinian conflict ===
In early June 2023, a United Nations Human Rights Council commission of inquiry said the proposed judicial system overhaul could pose a threat to Palestinians in Israel and Israeli-occupied territories. The commission's report indicated fears that the proposed legislation could, or would:

- Increase taxation of pro-Palestinian NGOs;
- Limit the NGOs' ability to document activities of Israeli soldiers in the Israeli-occupied West Bank;
- Strip some Israeli Arabs of their citizenship, allowing for their deportation if they have committed pro-Palestinian violence.

On 13 September 2023, Amnesty International published an article arguing that Israel's judicial overhaul has "alarming" implications for human rights, especially for Palestinians. It stated that Israel's judiciary, mainly its Supreme Court, has regularly upheld policies, practices and laws that helped enforce "Israel's system of apartheid against Palestinians". The article named examples of the role the Supreme Court played against Palestinians: upholding administrative detentions, green-lighting the destruction of villages, upholding a law imposing restrictions on family reunification. Amnesty argued that the Supreme Court intervened in protecting Palestinian human rights on few occasions, but if the institution loses power to the government, even this "slim and inconsistent" protection would disappear.

An article by former United States ambassador to Israel Martin Indyk and former Jordanian United Nations High Commissioner for Human Rights Zeid bin Ra'ad in Foreign Policy argued that the insistence of Israeli right-wing Finance Minister Bezalel Smotrich on curbing the powers of the Supreme Court, stems from a desire to "more easily enact his vision of an Israel that extends unimpeded from river to sea," as the court had previously impeded the legalization of Israeli settlements built on privately owned Palestinian land.

== Suspension and overruling ==
The eruption of the Gaza war in October 2023 and subsequent formation of a war cabinet led to a temporary suspension of the judicial reform and its opposition. However, official procedures obligated the Supreme Court to make a decision within three months of the October closing of the 2023 court case challenging the proposed Basic Law, which would limit the court's powers. At the same time, three of the court's justices were scheduled for mandatory retirement in mid-January 2024. Of the three retiring justices, two were liberal, and their departure and replacement could result in a conservative majority on the court who might have approved the reform. Before their retirement, the liberal-majority court announced its decision, in the first-ever panel to include all 15 justices.

On 1 January 2024, the court ruled, by a narrow 8-to-7 majority, that the Knesset law blocking the court's use of the "reasonableness" doctrine was unconstitutional, overturning the law—thus self-validating, reasserting and reinforcing the court's own authority to use the "reasonableness" standard, at its discretion, to review and overturn Knesset-passed laws. At the same time, by a broad 12–3 majority, the court ruled that it had the right to review any Knesset-passed Basic Law, and decide on its constitutional legitimacy. The rulings were seen as a major defeat for Netanyahu and his ruling coalition government, but not likely the final word on the issue.

== See also ==
- Human rights in Israel
- Judicial reform
