= Order of precedence in Israel =

Relative preeminence of officials for ceremonial purposes

The Israeli Ceremonial Protocol does not define an order of precedence. It does define, however, the group of officials that are to attend ceremonial events (Hebrew: Segel Aleph, סגל א'). This group consists of:

1. The President (Isaac Herzog)
2. The Prime Minister (Benjamin Netanyahu)
3. The Speaker of the Knesset (Matan Kahana)
4. The President of the Supreme Court (Yitzhak Amit)
5. The Chief Rabbis (Kalman Ber and David Yosef)
6. Former Presidents (Moshe Katsav and Reuven Rivlin)
7. Ministers of the Government (Amichai Chikli, Amihai Eliyahu, Avi Dichter, Bezalel Smotrich, Dudi Amsalem, Eli Cohen, Gideon Sa'ar, Gila Gamliel, Haim Katz, Idit Silman, Israel Katz, Itamar Ben-Gvir, May Golan, Miki Zohar, Miri Regev, Nir Barkat, Ofir Sofer, Orit Strook, Shlomo Karhi, Yariv Levin, Yitzhak Wasserlauf, Yoav Kisch)
8. The Leader of the Opposition (vacant), Chair of the Coalition (vacant)
9. Justices of the Supreme Court of Israel (Noam Sohlberg, Daphne Barak-Erez, David Mintz, Yael Willner, Ofer Grosskopf, Alex Stein, Gila Canfy-Steinitz, Khaled Kabub, Yechiel Kasher, Ruth Ronnen), President of the National Labor Court (Ilan Itah (acting))
10. The Attorney General of Israel (Gali Baharav-Miara)
11. The State Comptroller (vacant)
12. The Governor of the Bank of Israel (Amir Yaron)
13. Chairman of the Executive of the World Zionist Organization (Yaakov Hagoel)
14. Chairman of the Jewish Agency for Israel (Doron Almog)
15. The Dean of the Diplomatic corps (Vesela Mrđen Korać, Croatian Ambassador to Israel)
16. The Chief of Staff of the Israel Defense Forces (Eyal Zamir)
17. The Police Commissioner (Daniel Levi)
18. Members of the Knesset
  See List of members of the twenty-sixth Knesset
19. Commander of the Prison Service (Kobi Ya'akobi), Commissioner of the Israel Fire and Rescue Services (Eyal Caspi), Director of the Shin Bet (David Zini), Director of the Mossad (Roman Gofman), Head of the Atomic Energy Commission (Moshe Edri)
20. Former Prime Ministers, Speakers of Knesset, Chief Rabbis, Presidents of the Supreme Court and widows of former Presidents (Ehud Barak, Ehud Olmert, Avraham Burg, Dalia Itzik, Yuli Edelstein, Benny Gantz, Mickey Levy, Yisrael Meir Lau, Yona Metzger, Shlomo Amar, David Lau, Yitzhak Yosef, Aharon Barak, Dorit Beinisch, Asher Grunis and Esther Hayut)
21. Heads of Diplomatic Missions
22. Representatives of the minority religious communities in Israel – Christians, Muslims, Druze (Mowafaq Tarif), and Circassians
23. Military Secretary to the Prime Minister (Guy Markizano), Director-general of the Prime Minister's Office (vacant), Director-general of the Knesset (Moshe Edri)
24. Mayor of Jerusalem (Moshe Lion), Chairman of the Federation of Local Authorities (Haim Bibas), and Head of the hosting Local Government
25. Cabinet Secretary (Yossi Fuchs), Knesset Secretary (Dan Marzouk)
26. Members of the Executive of the World Zionist Organization, including the Chairman of Keren Hayesod (Sam Grundwerg)
