= Arieli =

Arieli is a surname. Notable people with the surname include:

- Asher Arieli (born 1957), Israeli rabbi
- Chen Arieli (born 1976), Israeli politician
- Shaul Arieli, Israeli military officer and expert on the Israeli–Palestinian conflict
- Yehoshua Arieli (1916–2002), Israeli historian
- Yitzhak Arieli (born 1974), Israeli rabbi
