= Muhamad Naamneh =

Arab-Israeli attorney and public activist

- محمد فخري نعامنة
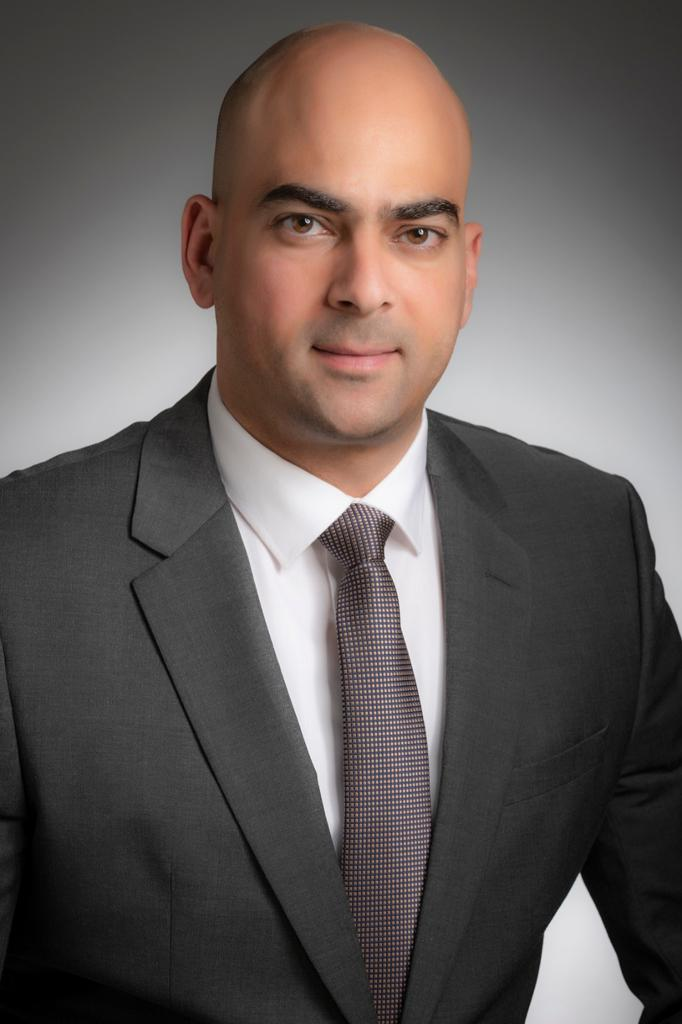
- Born: Nazareth, Israel
- Citizenship: Israeli
- Education: Hebrew University of Jerusalem
- Occupation: lawyer

Muhamad Naamneh (Arabic: محمد فخري نعامنة) is an Arab-Israeli attorney and public activist. Naamneh is a lawyer, mediator and notary, and the owner and Managing Partner of Na'amneh & Co. Law Office. Since 2019, he has been serving as the Chairman of the Northern District of the Israel Bar Association. In 2020 he joined the National Judicial Selection Committee (israel) and was re-elected for a second term in 2023.

Naamneh has been a member of the National Council of the Israel Bar Association since June 2011. He has previously held various positions within the Bar Association, including member of the Central Committee and Deputy Chairman of the Bar. In addition to his activities within the Bar Association, Naamneh is a social public activist and is considered a leading advocate for the rule of law among lawyers and the broader public community.

== Biography ==
Naamneh was born and raised in Nazareth in a family of six. His father, Fakhri Na'amneh, was an agronomist by profession. His mother, Aida, was a home maker. He has two brothers, both of whom are lawyers, and a sister who is an educational counselor. Naamneh is the maternal grandson of Judge Mohammad Nimr Al-Hawari, the first Arab judge in a District Court of Israel.

Naamneh attended Sisters of St. Joseph's School in Nazareth from a young age and completed his high school education in 1998. In 2002, he graduated from the Faculty of Law at the Hebrew University of Jerusalem with a Bachelor of Law (LLB). He completed his internship in the criminal department of the Haifa District Attorney's Office.

In 2003, he was certified as a lawyer and has been practicing law since. He started his career with a short period of work at the law office of Avigdor Feldman. In 2004, he established a private law firm in Nazareth, specializing in civil and criminal litigation. Today, the firm is one of the most recognized and leading firms in the Arab sector, with several branches nationwide. The firm provides legal services to private and business clients, non-profit organizations, insurance companies, and public institutions, representing high-profile public cases. Additionally, the firm regularly offers pro bono legal services to underprivileged individuals.

=== Public Service within the Israel Bar Association ===
From the beginning of his professional career, Naamneh has been involved in public service within the Israel Bar Association, volunteering in various capacities at both the national and northern district levels. In 2011, he was elected to represent the Northern District in the national institutions of the Israel Bar Association, serving as a member of the National Council (2011 to present) and the Central Committee (2012–2018). In 2015, he was elected as Deputy Chairman of the National Bar Association.

Additionally, he has served in presidencies of several committees and forums within the Bar Association's institutions, participating in various teams and committees alongside the National Council and Central Committee. These include membership in the Constitutional Affairs Forum, the Revision Committee on Internship Rules, Chairman of the International Organizations- Turkey Committee, Acting Chairman of the National Tort Forum, and representing the Bar Association in the Lahav Independent Business Organization. Naamneh is also a member of the Criminal Justice Safety Team led by Professor Boaz Sangero.

In the elections held on June 18, 2019, he ran for the first time for the head of the Northern District Committee and was elected by a large majority for a first term. In 2023, he was announced winner for another term until 2027 without elections in the district due to being the sole candidate. His list for the district, "Together-معا," was also announced the winner as no other list competed.

=== Judicial Selection Committee ===
In July 2019, Naamneh ran in the elections held in the National Council of the Israel Bar Association for the position of the Bar's representative on the National Judicial Selection Committee. His competitors were former Bar Chairman, Attorney Doron Barzilai, and Attorney Yitzhak (Itzik) Gordon. Naamneh won with a large majority, receiving support from 26 council members, compared to 12 for Barzilai and 5 for Gordon. He was elected on July 28, 2019, as the Bar's representative on the committee.

Naamneh is considered by many to be an acceptable candidate by most factions, receiving widespread support mainly due to his professional and statesmanlike conduct. After his first term, Naamneh ran for a second term and on July 31, 2023, won the elections with a majority of 34 to 3, effectively securing around 90% of the council members' votes. This election took place amidst a broad public debate on the judicial reform and changes in the composition of the Judicial Selection Committee.

== Personal life ==
Naamneh is married to Nawar Safadi, a pharmacist by profession. They have three children, Shahd, Karam, and Ward. The family resides in Nazareth. Naamneh speaks five languages, is an art enthusiast, and is a painter.
