= 2025 Israeli judicial reform =

Legislation limiting judiciary independence

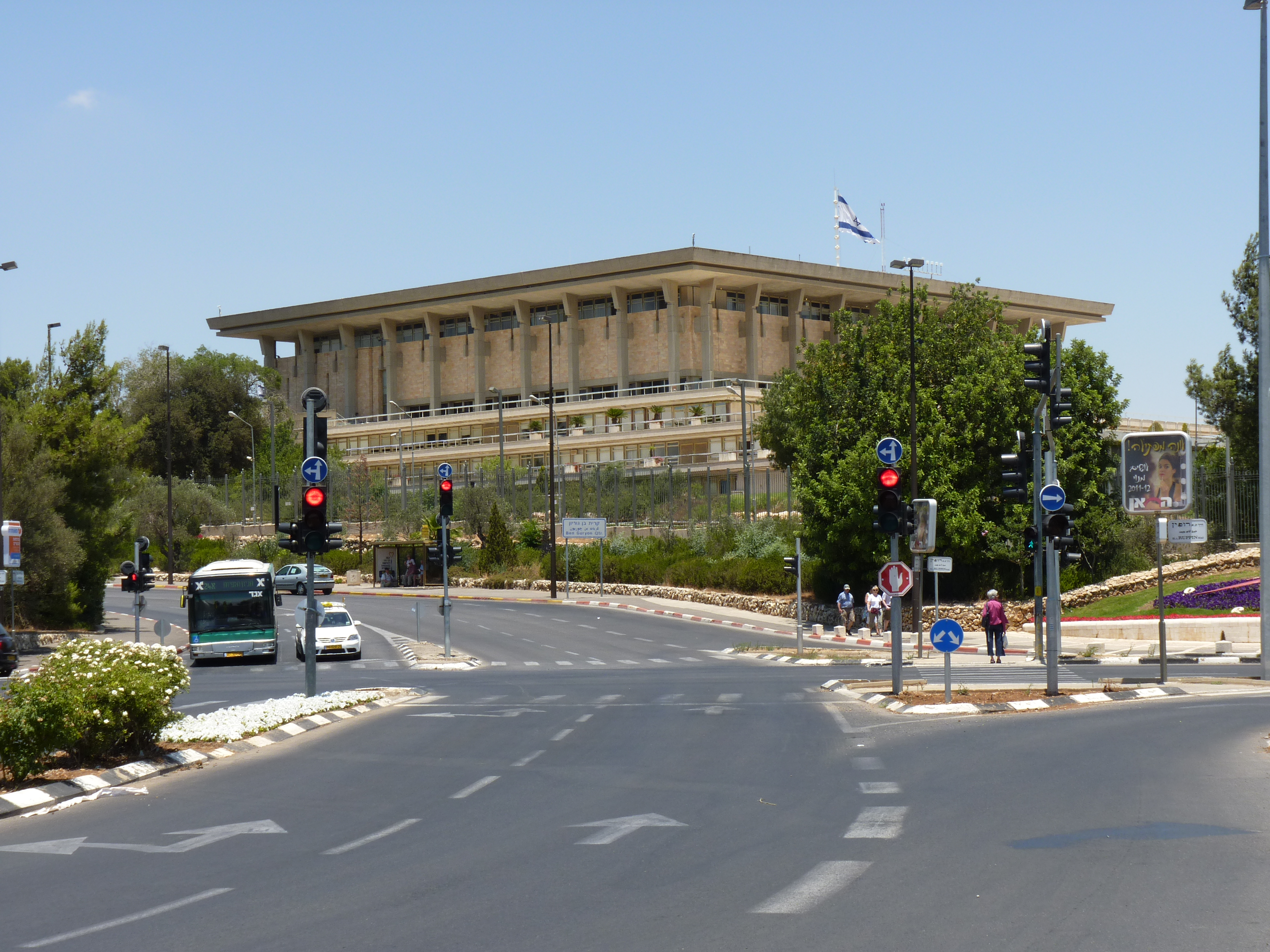

Knesset
- Territorial extent: The State of Israel
- Considered by: 25th Knesset in the Thirty-seventh government of Israel

Related legislation
- Basic Law: The Judiciary

The 2025 Israeli judicial reform is a series of changes to the composition of the Judicial Selection Committee in Israel. The government proposed a broader set of similar laws in 2023, which were struck down by the High Court of Israel.

== Background ==
The thirty-seventh government of Israel proposed a series of reforms in 2023 that sought to broadly change the judicial system, spearheaded by Justice Minister Yariv Levin and Knesset Constitution Committee chairman MK Simcha Rothman, but only one such proposed change was passed by the Knesset: the restriction of the "reasonableness standard", which was ruled an abuse of constituent power by the High Court of Israel in January 2024.

In a February 2023 interview with Haaretz, professor Daniel Blatman, a Holocaust historian at the Institute for Contemporary Jewry at the Hebrew University of Jerusalem, stated his belief that "Israel's government has neo-Nazi ministers. It really does recall Germany in 1933". He elaborated, "One thing we do see here is a regime that is starting to execute a speedy judicial, political, moral revolution – like in Germany. From January 1933, it was all over. Within half a year the country became unrecognizable". B. Michael, a writer for Haaretz, elaborated on Blatman's comparison the following month.

== Contents ==
The law, which is viewed as a "watered-down" version of the previously passed bill, will replace two members of the Judicial Selection Committee, who were previously members of the Israel Bar Association, with political appointees from the government and the opposition.

== Protests ==
The anticipated passage of the reform in late March led to a high volume of protests outside the Knesset, marking a continuation of the 2023 Israeli judicial reform protests, with several opposition MKs participating, including Gilad Kariv, Naama Lazimi, Efrat Rayten, while Benny Gantz also visited the protests.

== Passage ==
The law passed in the Knesset in late March 2025, with 67 votes in favor. The opposition boycotted the final vote. The only vote opposing the bill was from a member of the opposition, Mickey Levy, who claimed to vote by mistake.

Before the vote, National Unity party leader Benny Gantz, warned the nation was heading in a "dangerous direction", and quoted Menachem Begin, who served as prime minister from 1977 until 1983, who said that "democracies fall or die slowly when they suffer from a malignant disease called the tyranny of the majority, slowly until the curtain of darkness slowly descends on society".

The law will take effect when the next Knesset is convened, which will happen after the next election.

== Reactions ==
The Supreme Court of Israel announced on 2 December 2025 that all eleven justices will hear a case challenging the law, which will likely take place in June 2026.

== See also ==
- Antifa (Israel)
- Itamar Ben-Gvir
- Capital punishment in Israel
