= Neve Sha'anan =

Neve Sha'anan (Hebrew: נָוֶה שַׁאֲנָן, from Book of Isaiah; literally "tranquil abode") may refer to:

- Neve Sha'anan, Haifa, a large neighborhood in Haifa, Israel
- Neve Sha'anan, Jerusalem, a neighborhood in Jerusalem, Israel
- Neve Sha'anan, Tel Aviv, a neighborhood in Tel Aviv, Israel
