= Judicial Selection Committee (Israel) =

Body that appoints judges to courts

The Israeli Judicial Selection Committee (Hebrew: הוועדה לבחירת שופטים, romanized: hava'ada livchirat shoftim) is the body that appoints judges to Israeli courts.

The committee was established in 1953, following the enactment of the Judges Law. The founding of the committee was intended to prevent outside political pressure, and so ensure the independence of the judges. Prior to the establishment of the State of Israel on 14 May 1948, by its Declaration of Independence, courts and justices were chosen by the British Mandate, incorporating and adding to earlier Ottoman law.

== Appointment of judges before the committee's establishment ==
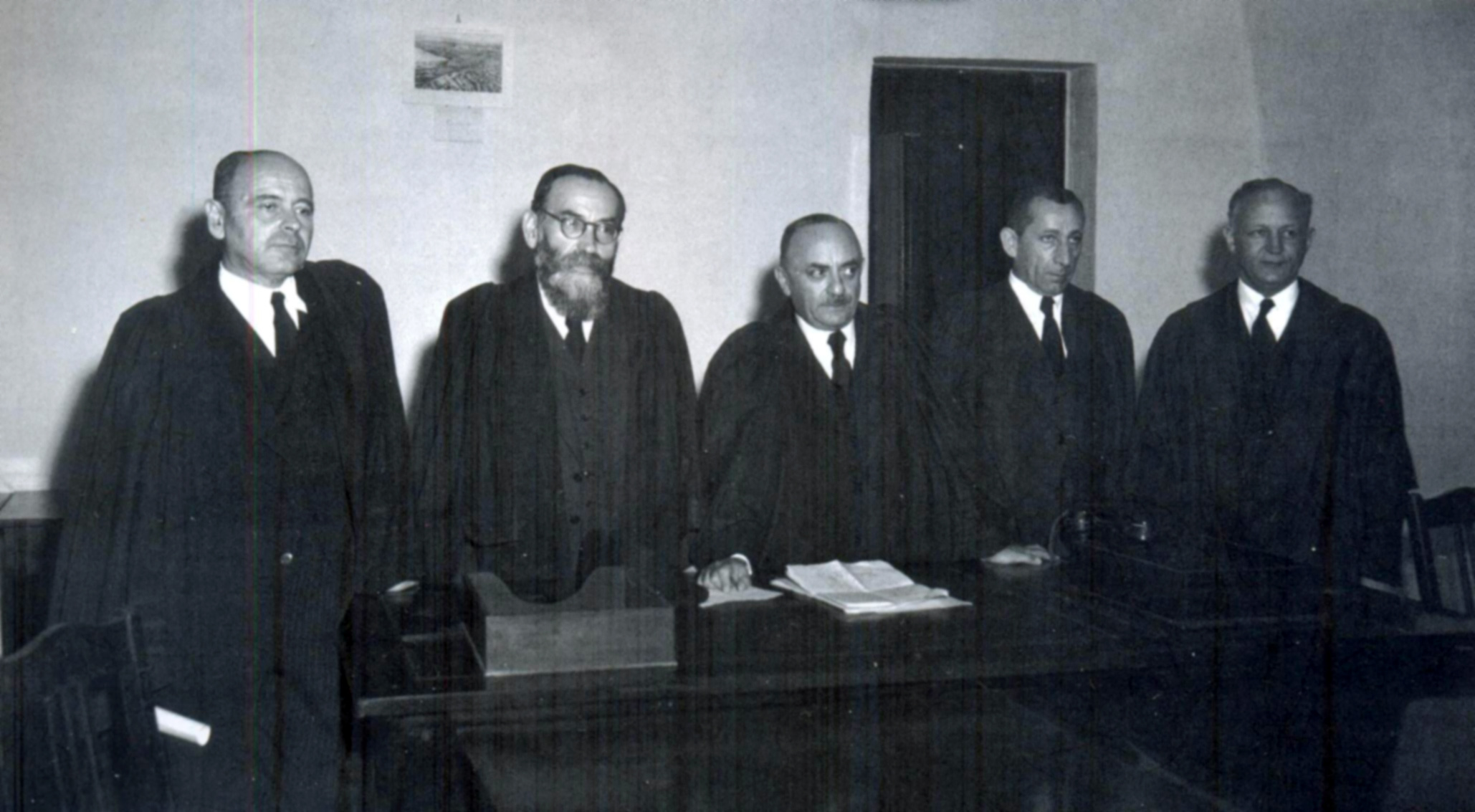
The first five Israeli Supreme Court judges. F.r.t.l.: Cheshin, Dunkelblum, Smoira, Assaf, Olshan.

Until the enactment of the Judges Bill, the Justice Minister appointed the judges. Only the appointment of judges to the Supreme Court needed approval of the Cabinet and the Knesset.

When the State of Israel was established, the British judges appointed by the Mandate government left the country, but in most courts the Jewish judges remained, allowing the continued operation of the courts following the Declaration of Independence. In the Supreme Court only one Jewish judge, Gad Frumkin, was serving at the time.

Pinchas Rosen, the first Justice Minister decided not to continue Frumkin's tenure, and appointed five new justices, who were confirmed by the provisional government and provisional state council in July 1948. The five judges were appointed on a partisan basis: the court president Moshe Smoira and Yitzhak Olshan were identified with Mapai; Menachem Dunkelblum was associated with the General Zionists; Rabbi Simcha Assaf represented the religious faction; and Zalman Cheshin was mistakenly considered to be a revisionist, although in fact he belonged to the Haganah.

== Judges Law ==
"During the state’s early years, the process of appointing judges was clearly political. The justice minister chose the judges to serve on the magistrate’s and district courts. The appointment of Supreme Court justices was more complicated, but it too was entirely political. Ahead of its inauguration in September 1948, five justices were initially appointed to the Supreme Court...In 1949-1950, the first government appointed two new, additional justices to the court." "In 1953, the Knesset passed the Judges Law. It created a nine-member Judicial Selection Committee, which still exists today".

== Committee structure today ==
According to Basic Law: the Judiciary, adopted in 1984, the committee has nine members, as follows

- Justice Minister – Chairman
- Cabinet Minister, chosen by the Cabinet.
- Two Knesset Members, chosen by the Knesset (since 1992 they usually appoint one member from the coalition and one from the opposition).
- Two members of the Israel Bar Association (usually selected by the two largest factions in the bureau).
- The Chief Justice, and two other judges of the Supreme Court (replaced every three years by the panel of judges, the selection is usually by seniority).

== Current composition ==
Representatives of the Supreme Court

- Judge Yitzhak Amit – President of the Supreme Court. Member since 2024.
- Judge Noam Sohlberg – Deputy President of the Supreme Court. Member since 2024.
- Judge Daphne Barak-Erez – Supreme Court Justice. Member since 2023.

Bar Association representatives

- Attorney Yonit Kalmanovitz – Member since 2024.
- Attorney Muhamad Naamneh – Head of Northern District in the Bar Association. Member since 2020.

Israeli cabinet representatives

- Yariv Levin – Justice Minister
- Orit Strook – Minister of Settlements and National Missions

Knesset representatives

- MK Karine Elharrar
- MK Yitzhak Kroizer

== Judicial selection process ==
The process of electing the judges is regulated by the Rules of Procedure of the Judicial Selection Committee, 1984.

This process includes:

- Application for election by the applicant. Includes filled questionnaire; resume; recommendations; etc.
- Verification of recommendations by the court's administration.
- Publishing the candidate list in Reshumot, followed by a waiting period of at least 21 days in which every citizen may contact the committee before the hearing, with a reasoned explanation of opposition to a particular candidate.
- Interview of the candidate by a subcommittee of the Judicial Selection Committee, containing at least three members (at least one judge, one attorney, and one MK).
- Final decision by the Committee to confirm or reject a candidate.

The Committee's decision to appoint a judge in all courts (except the Supreme Court), is passed by a simple majority of members present at the meeting. Appointing Supreme Court judges requires a majority of 7 of the 9 committee members, or two less than the number present at the meeting (6 of 8, 5 of 7, etc.).

Confidentiality applies legally to the committee's deliberations and they are not published for public review. This confidential appointment process is unique, because the selection process for every other public office is required by law to register and publish minutes of the committee's meetings.

== 2025 reform ==
The government of Israel passed judicial reform in March 2025 that would no longer have two members of the Israel Bar Association on the committee and replace them with a member of the coalition and a member of the government, though it would not take effect until a new Knesset is seated.

== Controversy of the committee's composition ==
During the existence of the Judicial Committee the influence of the Supreme Court committee members was almost absolute: although they constituted just one-third of the nine-member committee, they formed the most cohesive and relatively stable bloc. Furthermore, until a reform proposed by Gideon Sa'ar in 2008, a simple majority was sufficient to elect all judges, including judges to the Supreme Court. Until the reform, the judges dominated the Committee through an alliance forged with the like-minded representatives of the Bar Association. These two factions could determine which justices would be selected. During those years, Court critics, particularly those opposed to its judicial activism, dubbed the selection system "one friend brings another." Since the reform, however, a majority of seven justices is required to appoint judges to the Supreme Court and the bloc of justices is balanced by the three members of the governing coalition on the committee. Either side is large enough to veto any nominee.

The composition of the court radically changed after Barak's retirement and the appointment of more centrist or right-wing ministers of justice including Tzipi Livni, Gideon Sa'ar and Ayelet Shaked. These ministers actively sought to diversify the bench. During the tenure of Shaked (2015-2019), a member of the right-wing parties, The Jewish Home and New Right, six new justices were appointed to the Supreme Court. According to the Israel Democracy Institute, four of these were conservative and two were liberal. After the most recent round of appointments, Shaked declared that "the campaign to remake the Supreme Court has been completed.

Despite these changes, some right-wing critics maintain even now that the selection process does not properly represent public opinion, and that since the Supreme Court inevitably discusses politically disputed matters, the process impairs the principles of democracy. This is the explanation of coalition leaders including Justice Minister Yariv Levin and Knesset Law Committee Chairman Simcha Rothman for the judicial "overhaul" they are trying to implement, which includes the composition of the Judicial Selection Committee. Specifically, Levin's "overhaul" includes replacing the two members of the Israel Bar with representatives of the public to be appointed by the Minister of Justice. Opponents of the government on this issue warn that these changes would lead to the politicization of the committee based on the political views and affiliations of its members rather than professional skills. At the time of Levin's attempted judicial overhaul, the court was thought to be evenly balanced with conservative and liberal judges split almost down the middle. Thus, in a 2023 vote on a key coalition bill to significantly reduce the power of the Supreme Court, the justices voted to reject the legislation by a narrow majority of 8-7.

Daniel Friedmann was appointed Justice Minister in February 2007. Critical of the judicial system before, and an outspoken opponent of the Supreme Court and the committee's selection process, he was picked by, then Prime Minister, Ehud Olmert to shake up the judicial system. His opponents criticized his appointment as a political maneuver to influence the judicial system, specifically the case against Olmert's close friend and important ally, and Friedmann's predecessor as Justice Minister, Haim Ramon. Friedmann criticized the court's handling of the Ramon affair in an article just days prior to his appointment; he later also criticized the guilty verdict on Ramon.

Friedmann proposed some fundamental changes to the committee, including the number of members and the way they were to be selected. He had some highly publicized encounters with Supreme Court President Dorit Beinish and her predecessor, Aharon Barak, over his reform proposals and other related matters. Barak even said about some of Friedmann's proposals that they were like "holding a gun to the head of the Supreme Court". In the end, he succeeded in implementing some of his proposed changes, but the system's critics still charged that they weren't nearly enough.

Prior to his appointment as Justice Minister, Professor Daniel Friedmann had written that it was crucial to make changes in the composition of the committee. He proposed that instead of selecting all three justices to the committee from the Supreme Court, two should be district court judges or retired district court judges. Some of the benefits would be dispersed authority (preventing a powerful positioning of a relatively small group of Supreme Court justices in driving the whole judicial system); more objective approach to candidates; and that the district judges would be better acquainted with the candidates for lower courts whom they have to appoint.

Another suggestion to change the composition of the Judicial Selection Committee was made recently by Mordechai Heller, a right-wing supporter of the government's judicial overhaul, He suggested an appointments system reminiscent of the federal courts in the United States, and to some extent the method that was used in Israel before 1953: authorizing the Prime Minister to propose candidates who would be appointed by the Knesset after a public hearing process. Heller raised the possibility of adding a professional committee to ensure that candidates meet the appropriate qualification level.

In contrast, the Israeli Democracy Institute supports leaving the status quo intact, and includes the existing system in its proposed Constitution without any changes. The former head of the Israel Bar Association, Yuri Guy-Ron (2007-2015), also supports keeping the existing system. (Retired) Supreme Court President Aharon Barak strongly condemned the proposed changes in selecting judges. He argued that although the Israeli system is not free of problems, it still topped all the suggestions to improve it, and that on this matter it was better that other countries learn from Israel and not the opposite.

Several Knesset members tried at different times to change the legislation the committee structure, including David Tal and Michael Eitan, at the time chairman of the Knesset Constitution, Law and Justice Committee, but their proposals didn't garner enough support.

In June 2009, with the selection to the committee of the two right-wing Members of Knesset, Uri Ariel (National Union), and David Rotem (Yisrael Beiteinu), a conflict erupted between the various factions of MKs. The first committee meeting brought about a fundamental change in the appointing process when it was ruled that candidates will need to undergo tests and a course adjustment, and will be evaluated by a psychologist to examine their mental suitability—against the fierce opposition of Chief Justice Dorit Beinish.

=== Comparisons ===
According to a 2019 study by the Kohelet Policy Forum (a right-wing organization working to change the current appointment process), of the 37 OECD member states, 31 countries grant control over the selection of the members of the highest constitutional court to elected public officials. Of those: In ten countries, members of the court are selected in collaboration between the executive and the legislative branches; in six countries, the legislative branch alone selects its members; in ten countries, they are selected solely by the executive branch; and in five countries, a split model is used where elected public officials control the identity of most of the serving judges but not all of them. Thus, for example, in the United States, the president of the United States selects the justices of the Supreme Court with the approval of the Senate. In France, members of the Constitutional Council are selected by the president and both chambers of parliament. In Australia, the attorney general selects the members of the Supreme Court. In Japan, they are selected by the Japanese government with the approval of the entire country through a public referendum. Diverging slightly from the above pattern, in Italy, elected public officials are responsible for selecting ten of the 15 members of the Constitutional Court (while the rest are selected by the legal system). An examination of the judicial selection process in each state of the USA reveals an even clearer tendency than above, as in all of them, the process of selecting the members of the highest constitutional court is given to elected public officials in one way or another.

Only Israel and five other countries place the power to determine the identity of all or most of the members of the constitutional court in the hands of entities who are not elected public officials. The other five countries are the United Kingdom, Luxembourg, Greece, and Colombia. However, of the above five, in the United Kingdom and Luxembourg, the court does not have the power to overturn legislation and therefore, the public—through its elected representatives—continues to control the determination of policy.

Opponents of the government's plans to change the judicial selection committee point to the fact that an independent judiciary with the ability to restrain the power of the government is particularly necessary in Israel. According to Yaniv Roznai, Associate Professor and Vice-Dean at the Harry Radzyner Law School, and Prof. Amichai Cohen at the Faculty of Law at Ono Academic College, there is a lack of mechanisms for the separation of powers and the establishment of checks and balances in the Israeli governance system. They maintain that in other countries there are six distinct institutional mechanisms that can help distribute political power and prevent it from being concentrated in one institution. These include two legislative chambers (bicameralism), a presidential system, federalism, regional electoral systems, supra-national organizations and supra-national courts. These mechanisms facilitate the representation of different voices, improve decision-making processes and help balance the relationship between majority and minority interests. The authors conducted a study of 66 countries categorized as "free states" by Freedom House, a USA-based organization that monitors and supports democratic progress around the world. They found that among these countries, "Israel stands out as the only country with no structural, internal or external political restriction on the legislature."

American lawyer Alan Dershowitz thinks "...the (Israeli) system is a much better one than the United States. We've had lots and lots of unqualified justices appointed to the (U.S.) Supreme court politically. The Senate confirmation hearings are a disaster."

== See also ==
- Supreme Court of Israel
