= Yitzhak Arieli =

Rabbi Yitzhak Arieli
- יצחק אריאלי
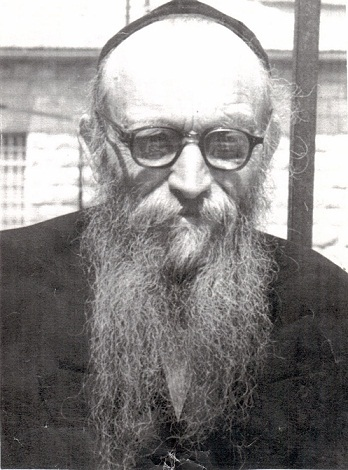

Personal life
- Born: 1896 Old City, Jerusalem, Ottoman Empire
- Died: April 5, 1974 (aged 77–78) Jerusalem, Israel
- Known for: Founder of Kiryat Shmuel and Neve Sha'anan neighborhoods, spiritual leader of the Knesset Yisrael neighborhood, posek of Bikur Holim Hospital, mashgiach ruchani of Mercaz HaRav Yeshiva
- Occupation: Rabbi

Religious life
- Religion: Judaism
- Denomination: Orthodox

Senior posting
- Awards: Israel Prize in Rabbinical literature (1966)

Yitzhak Arieli (Hebrew: יצחק אריאלי; born 1896, died 5 April 1974) was a leading Israeli rabbi.

== Biography ==
Arieli was born in 1896 in the Old City of Jerusalem, which was then part of the Ottoman Empire, and studied at Torat Hayim and Etz Chaim yeshivot in Jerusalem.

He was one of the founders of Kiryat Shmuel and Neve Sha'anan neighborhoods in central Jerusalem. He was also the spiritual leader of the Knesset Yisrael neighborhood, where he resided.

Arieli developed a close relationship with Rav Kook following the latter's arrival in Jerusalem in 1921, and became one of his leading students.

Arieli was appointed as posek of Bikur Holim Hospital and served as the mashgiach ruchani of Jerusalem's Mercaz HaRav Yeshiva.

His grandson Asher Arieli is a senior lecturer at Yeshivas Mir. His granddaughter Yael Willner is a judge on the Supreme Court of Israel.

== Awards and honours ==
- In 1966, Rabbi Arieli was awarded the Israel Prize, in Rabbinical literature.
- There is a street named after Rabbi Arieli in Beitar Illit, and in the Nachlaot neighborhood of Jerusalem there is a street name after the title of one of his books "Anayim Lemishpat".

== Published works ==
- Anayim Lemishpat
- Shirat Hage'ulah - on the Passover Hagadah
- Midrash Arieli

== See also ==
- List of Israel Prize recipients
