= Nochi Dankner =

Israeli businessman (born 1954)

- נוחי דנקנר
- Born: November 13, 1954 (age 71)
- Occupation: Businessman
- Known for: Controlling shareholder of the Israel Discount Bank

Nochi Dankner (Hebrew: נוחי דנקנר; born 13 November 1954) is an Israeli businessman and a board member of the Jewish Agency for Israel. He was the controlling shareholder of the IDB Group. Dankner is also the founder and chairman of the Ganden Group - which led him to a personal bankruptcy of 400 million NIS. In 2017 he was convicted of Securities Fraud for a scheme to inflate his company's stock price in order to raise money when it was struggling financially.

== Biography ==
Nochi Dankner was born in Tel Aviv. He is the son of Zahava and Yitzhak Dankner, one of six brothers who founded Dankner Investments. In 1972 he was drafted to the Israel Air Force's pilot academy, and dropped out after a year. He went to the IDF's officer training course and was placed in air force intelligence for the remainder of his service, which he finished at the rank of captain. During his military service Dankner started his first business. In 1975 he opened Botticelli, a wine and cheese house in Old Jaffa. He opened the business together with Modi Cidon, one of the owners of Gitam Advertising in Israel, who is his friend from pilot's academy and one of his closest friends at present. Army regulations prohibited soldiers to open a business at that time, however artistic activity was allowed. Dankner and Cidon had frequent art exhibitions at Botticelli's, and received approval due to this move.

Dankner studied political science and law at Tel Aviv University, where he edited the law review. After graduation, he began to work as a trainee lawyer at Yigal Arnon & Co law firm, which he left after several years to establish Dankner-Lusky law firm with advocate Moshe Lusky.

=== Ganden Tourism ===
Dankner founded Ganden Tourism and Aviation in 1996, along with his father Itzhak, his sister Shelly Dankner and several other businessmen. Ganden operated as a holding company in aviation and tourism, and was the 3rd largest group in Israel after El-Al and Knafaim (Wings). Ganden acquired control of Open Skies, a representative of foreign airlines in Israel and shares in the travel agencies 3rd Millennium, Natour and Unitel. Ganden's main acquisition was the takeover of IsraAir airlines. Ganden was eventually sold to IDB Development, in a controversial deal.

=== Bank Hapoalim ===
In 1997 Dankner and his cousin Danny Dankner initiated a deal in which Melach Industries, controlled by the family, acquired 11.6% of the shares of Bank Hapoalim for $358 million USD. The acquisition was fully financed by a loan which Melach Industries took from Bank Leumi by using land it owned as collateral. Bank Leumi valued the land at $200 million USD based on an agreement with government that provided significant building rights on this land. This loan has not been returned to date.

The land valuation was determined based on an agreement for which Dankner was arrested and questioned on suspicion of bribery and money laundering. In reality, the value of the land held by Melach Industries was significantly lower than Bank Leumi's estimate, and it is doubtful that the loan would have been approved based on the actual valuation.

=== IDB Acquisition ===
In May 2003 Ganden Holdings, together with the Livnat and Manor families, acquired control of the IDB Group, one of the largest and most active holding companies in Israel. The Israeli pension fund Mivtachim, controlled by the Histadrut (Israel's labor union), provided $54 million USD in funding to Ganden, in order to complete the acquisition. Following the deal, Dankner and his partners held 55% of IDB Holdings.

Dankner's first seven years in IDB where a success and during this period he significantly increased the company's business through a series of acquisitions. In 2005 Discount Investments acquired the shares of Cellcom and in 2006 IDB acquired Koor Industries. Shufersal acquired Clubmarket.

In 2011, Dankner sold the Israeli agrochemicals manufacturer Makhteshim Agan to China National Agrochemical Corporation, a subsidiary of China National Chemical Corporation (ChemChina). Prime Minister Benjamin Netanyahu described the deal as "a big achievement for the economy of Israel." That year he was ranked eleventh in Forbes Magazine's list of wealthy Israelis.

Through IDB Holdings Dankner controlled various companies such as Cellcom, Shufersal, Netvision, Hadera Paper and Nesher Cement. He also had subsequent shares in Clal Insurance and Bank Hapoalim Total worth of companies, controlled by Nochi Dankner was about 400 billion NIS.

On December 17, 2013 Dankner lost control of IDB. On 5 January 2014, the Israeli District Court of Tel Aviv ruled that control of IDB would be handed over to the Extra-Elshtein Group, controlled by Eduardo Elstein and Motti Ben Moshe.

== Trial and conviction ==
=== Fraud ===
After some bad business deals made by Dankner, including investment in failed Las Vegas hotel and residential project, collapsed Maariv newspaper deal, IDB, which was a public company at the time sustained millions of dollars losses. Dankner tried to save the control of the company and hired Itay Strum, broker Adi Sheleg and some others to buy and sell IDB stock, causing inflation of prices during a public offering in February 2012. The intention was to raise capital for the company. Itay Sturm received eight million shekels from Nochi Dankner in order to buy and sell. Strum and his colleagues bought stock at higher prices, while they knew it was worth much less in order to manipulate traders to buy IDB stock at inflated prices. This raises the stock's price beyond its real one, which is illegal stock manipulation by law. [citation to law needed]

Dankner was charged with securities fraud and market manipulation. His trial took place in the Tel Aviv District Court before Judge Khaled Kabub. During the trial Dankner received dozens of letters and various documents in his support. Those documents were admitted at the trial as evidence of his good character. The documents came from different organisations, including the World Jewish Congress and Bar-Ilan University. Individual letters were received from top officers in the IDF, politicians and rabbis.

Dankner was convicted in July 2016. On 6 December 2016, he was sentenced to two years in prison, as well as 800,000 NIS fine. In addition, Dankner received a suspended sentence of an additional year. Prosecutors had asked for a three- to five-year prison sentence. Judge Khabub's formula of sentencing was: "deemed it appropriate to punish the accused within the lower levels of the appropriate punishment due to the personalities of the accused, their extraordinary philanthropic work and the damages and losses they inflicted on themselves by getting embroiled in this scheme."

His accomplice Itay Strum was also convicted and sentenced to a one-year prison term and a 500000 NIS fine. IDB Holdings and Strum's ISP Trading Group were fined 250000 NIS and 150000 NIS.

Dankner appealed the conviction to the Israeli Supreme Court. On 29 August 2018, the Supreme Court rejected his appeal and increased his sentence to three years in prison. It also doubled Itay Strum's sentence to two years in prison. The Supreme Court ruled that he would begin serving his sentence on 2 October 2018. On 2 October, he arrived at Maasiyahu Prison to begin serving his sentence. He was granted early release in February 2020.
