= Yael Willner =

Israeli jurist (born 1959)

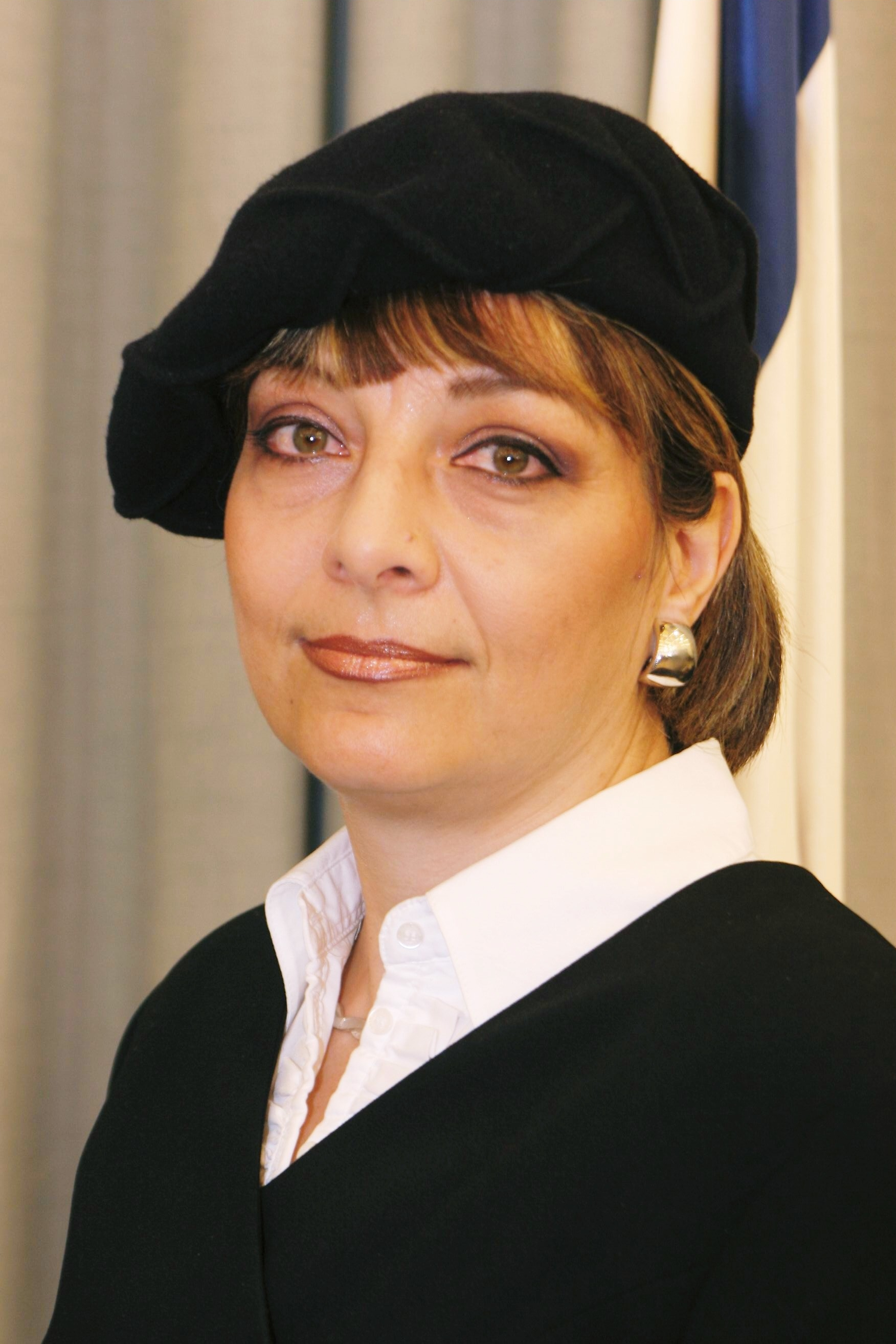
- Yael Willner

Justice of the Supreme Court of Israel
- Incumbent
- Assumed office 30 October 2017

Personal details
- Born: September 22, 1959 (age 66) Israel
- Education: Hebrew University of Jerusalem (LLB)

Yael Willner (Hebrew: יָעֵל וִילְנֶר; née Arieli (אֲרִיאֵלִי), born 22 September 1959) is an Israeli jurist who has served as a justice of the Supreme Court of Israel since 2017. She is considered to be a conservative justice.

== Early life and education ==
Willner was born in Israel, one of six children born to Ruth Hanna and Nahum Arieli. Her paternal grandfather is Rabbi Yitzhak Arieli. She attended the Ulpanat Chorev (he) national religious high school in Bayit VeGan, Jerusalem, and graduated in 1977. During this time, she participated in Gush Emunim settlement activity. She served in Sherut Leumi for one year in Kiryat Shmona in 1978.

Willner began studying law at the Hebrew University of Jerusalem in 1978 and graduated with a law degree in 1982. From 1980 to 1981, she worked as a parliamentary aide to Knesset member Haim Kaufman, and from 1981 to 1983 she interned with Supreme Court judge Moshe Bejski and at the State Attorney's Office with Dorit Beinisch.

== Legal career ==
After being admitted to the Israel Bar Association in 1983, she practiced law as an attorney from 1983 to 1998.

In 1998, Willner was appointed a judge on the Haifa Magistrate's Court. In 2004, she was appointed a registrar and acting judge in the Haifa District Court, and was appointed as a permanent judge on the Haifa District Court in 2006. She was a candidate for the Supreme Court in 2011, but was not appointed. She was selected to serve on the Supreme Court by the Judicial Selection Committee in February 2017, and began serving in October 2017.

== Personal life ==
She is married to Yosef Willner and is a mother of four children. She lives in the Neve Sha'anan neighborhood of Haifa.
