= Anat Baron =

Israeli jurist (born 1953)

- עֲנָת בָּרוֹן
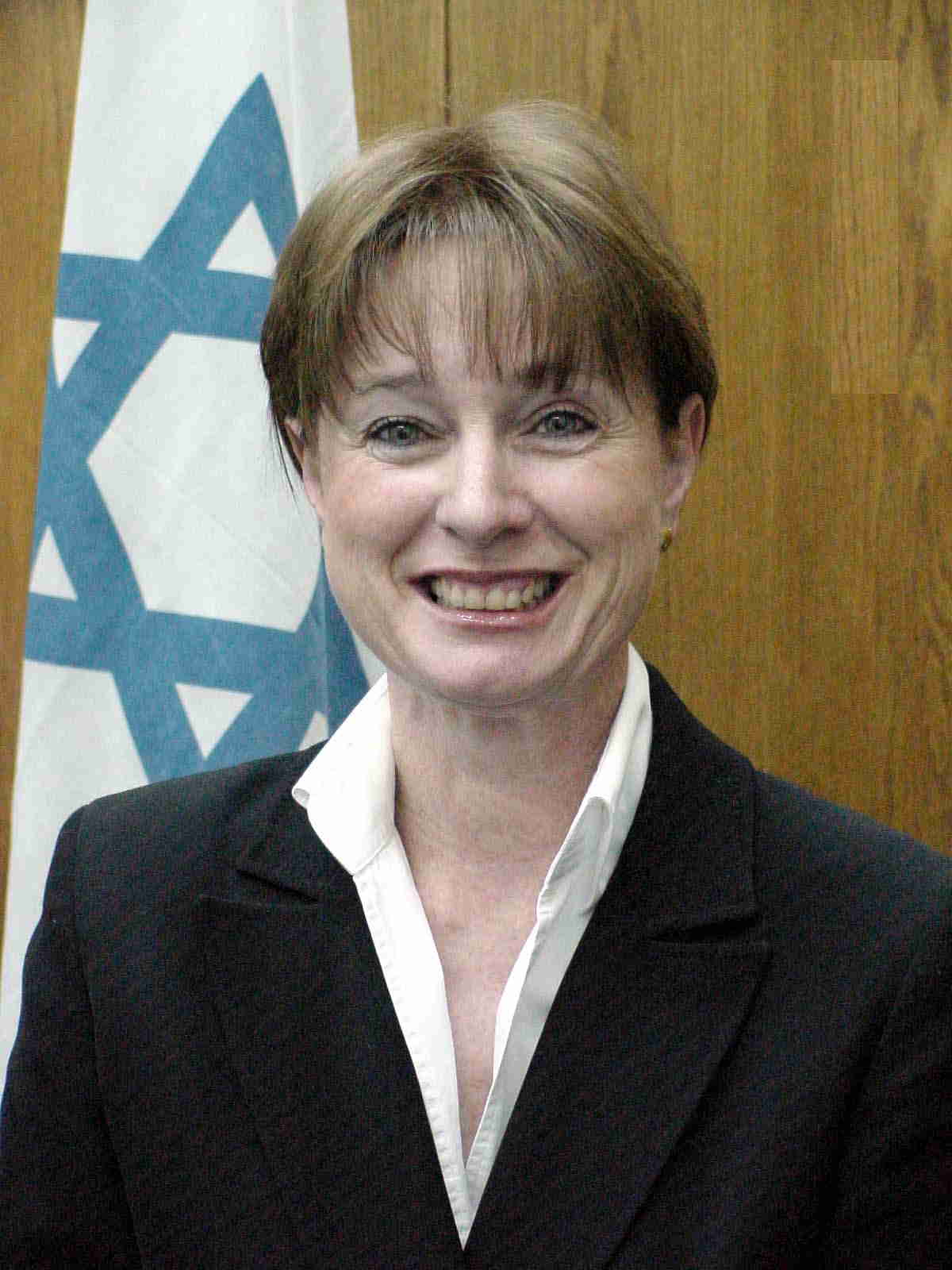

Justice of the Supreme Court of Israel
- In office January 2015 – October 2023

Judge of the Tel Aviv District Court
- In office 2002–2014

Judge of the Tel Aviv Magistrate's Court
- In office 1991–2002

Personal details
- Born: October 12, 1953 (age 72) Israel
- Spouse: Gabi Baron
- Children: Ran (1980-2003), Ido (b. 1983)
- Education: Tel Aviv University
- Profession: Judge, attorney

Anat Baron (Hebrew: עֲנָת בָּרוֹן; born 12 October 1953) is an Israeli judge who served as a justice on the Supreme Court of Israel from 2015 to 2023.

== Biography ==
Anat Baron was born in Israel in 1953. After graduating from the Ironi Dalet High School in Tel Aviv in 1971, she served for two years in the Israel Defense Forces. After her military service, she studied law at Tel Aviv University and graduated in 1977. From 1976 to 1979, she interned at the Office of the General Counsel to the Ministry of Defense and in a private law firm. She was admitted to the Israel Bar Association in 1979.

Baron is married to real estate developer Gabi Baron, who chairs the Board of Directors of the Israel Conservatory of Music in Tel Aviv. They had two children, Ran (1980–2003) and Ido (b. 1983). Ran, a budding musician and stand-up comedian, was killed in the Mike's Place suicide bombing in 2003.

== Legal career ==
Baron worked as an attorney in private practice until 1991, when she was appointed a judge on the Tel Aviv Magistrate's Court. In 2002, she was appointed a judge on the Tel Aviv District Court. She specialized in civil cases, and the most well-known case she was involved in as a district judge was the Anat Kamm–Uri Blau affair.

In September 2014, she was selected to be a judge on the Supreme Court. She assumed this position in January 2015. She retired in October 2023.
