= Moshe Smoira =

Former President of the Supreme Court of Israel

- משה זמורה
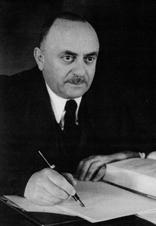

President of the Supreme Court of Israel
- In office 1948–1954
- Appointed by: David Ben-Gurion
- Preceded by: William James Fitzgerald (as Chief Justice of the Supreme Court of Mandatory Palestine)
- Succeeded by: Yitzhak Olshan

Personal details
- Born: 25 October 1888 Königsberg, Prussia, German Empire
- Died: 8 October 1961 (aged 72) Jerusalem, Israel
- Education: University of Giessen

Military service
- Allegiance: German Empire
- Branch/service: Imperial German Army
- Battles/wars: World War I

Moshe Smoira (Hebrew: משה זמורה; Moshe Zmora; 25 October 1888 – 8 October 1961) was an Israeli jurist and the first President of the Supreme Court of Israel.

== Biography ==
Smoira was born in 1888 in Königsberg, in the German Empire to Leiser and Perel, Hasidic immigrants from Russia. He studied Hebrew and became a Zionist. His future wife, Esther Horovitz from Minsk, was a relative of Zalman Shazar.

He studied law at Heidelberg University, but his studies were interrupted by the outbreak of the First World War, during which he joined the German Army and was later wounded in action. After the war, he organized Hebrew courses in Berlin and later received his doctorate in jurisprudence from the University of Giessen as well as an M.A. in Semitic languages.

In 1921 he emigrated to the British Mandate of Palestine and opened a practice in Jerusalem. He was a partner of Pinchas Rosen, who later became the Israeli Justice Minister, and was associated with Mapai. He was invited by the Mandate authorities to teach at the Jerusalem Law School and became a lecturer there. He was the lawyer for the Histadrut. He specialized in Labor law and was one of the initiators and drafters of the Mandatory Law of compensation to dismissed workers.

In the 1930s he was appointed President of the Court of Honor of the World Zionist Organization and President of the Association of Jewish Lawyers in Eretz Israel. After the Israeli Declaration of Independence in 1948 he was appointed President of the Supreme Court. He did not consider the Declaration of Independence a legally binding document.

In 1954 he retired due to a terminal illness and was succeeded by Yitzhak Olshan. He died in 1961 in Jerusalem. In 1989, Israel issued a stamp in his honour. His daughter, Michal, married Supreme Court judge Haim Cohn.
