= Yitzhak Olshan =

Former President of the Supreme Court of Israel

- יצחק אולשן
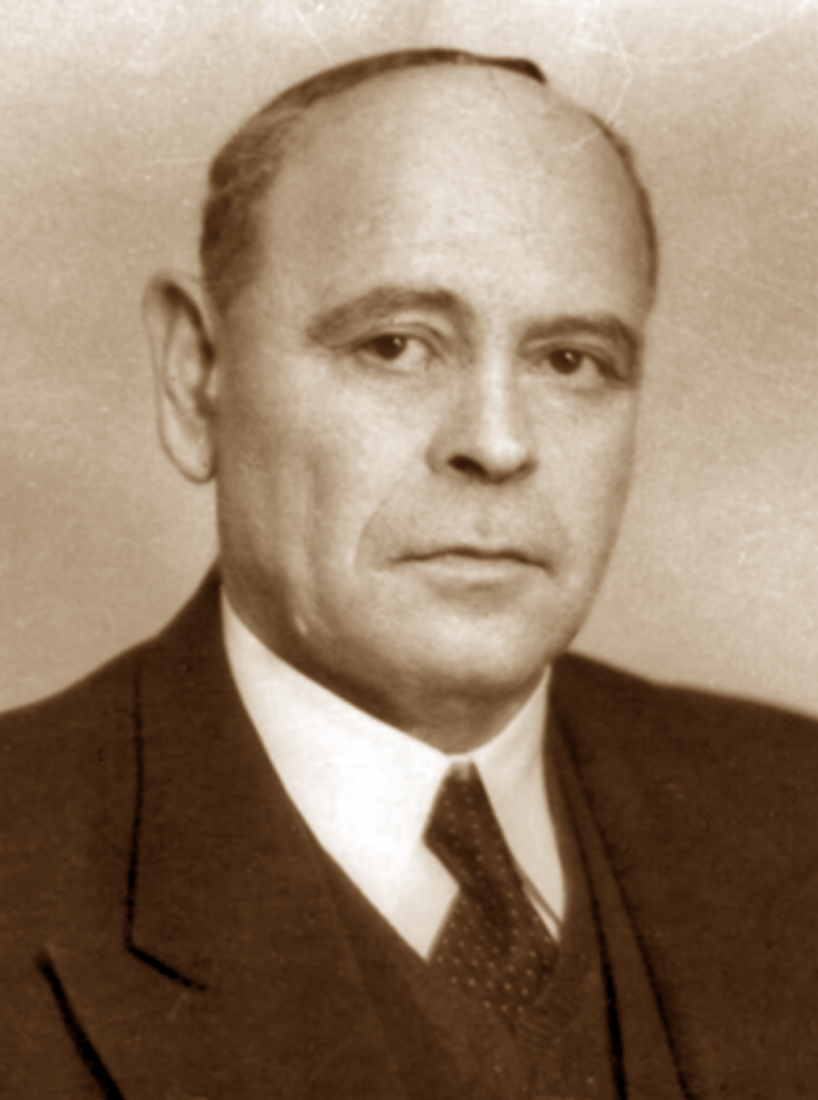
- Yitzhak Olshan

Supreme Court of Israel judge
- In office 1948–1965

President of the Supreme Court of Israel
- In office 1954–1965
- Preceded by: Moshe Smoira
- Succeeded by: Shimon Agranat

Personal details
- Born: 19 February 1895 Kaunas, Russian Empire
- Died: 5 February 1983 (aged 87) Israel

Yitzhak Olshan (Hebrew: יצחק אולשן; February 19, 1895 – February 5, 1983) was an Israeli jurist and the second President of the Supreme Court of Israel from 1954 to 1965.

== Biography ==
Olshan was born in Kaunas in the Russian Empire (now Lithuania) in 1895 and immigrated to Ottoman Palestine in 1912. He joined the Hagana and the Jewish Legion. He studied law and oriental studies at the University of London. As an attorney, he represented the Yishuv before the British Mandate of Palestine authorities.

In 1948 he was appointed a Supreme Court of Israel judge. He headed a parliamentary commission to investigate the Israel Defense Forces' (IDF) economy and the Central Elections Committee of the second Knesset. In 1954 he was appointed by Moshe Sharett head of the inquiry commission regarding the Lavon affair with President of the Technion and former IDF Chief of Staff, Yaakov Dori.

In 1954, he succeeded Moshe Smoira as President of the Supreme Court. He retired in 1965 and was succeeded by Shimon Agranat. He died in 1983.
