= Yariv Levin =

Israeli politician (born 1969)

- יריב לוין
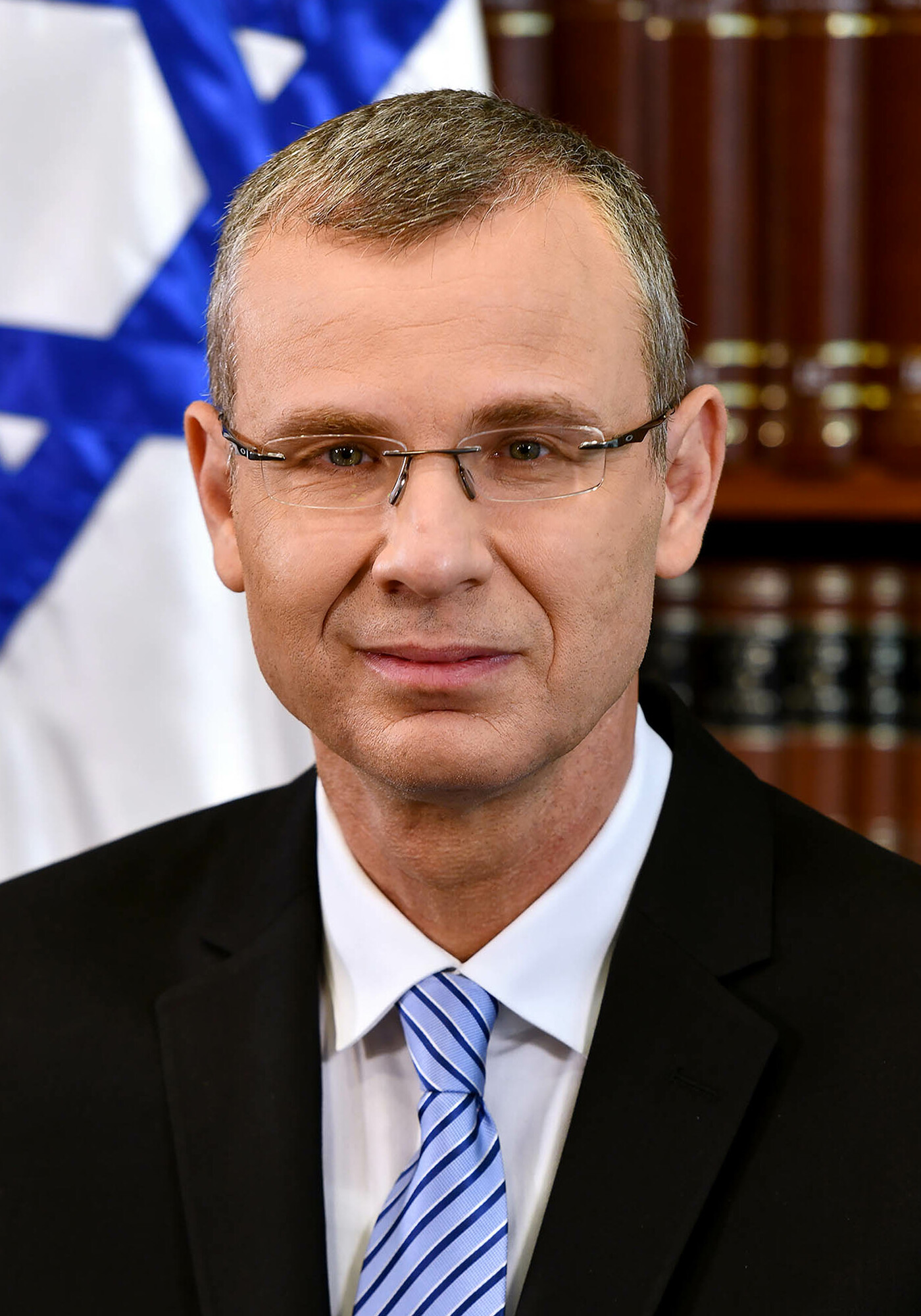
- Levin in 2020

Speaker of the Knesset
- In office 13 December 2022 – 29 December 2022
- Preceded by: Mickey Levy
- Succeeded by: Amir Ohana
- In office 17 May 2020 – 13 June 2021
- Preceded by: Benny Gantz
- Succeeded by: Mickey Levy

Ministerial roles
- 2015: Minister of Internal Security
- 2015–2020: Minister of Tourism
- 2018–2019: Minister of Aliyah and Integration
- 2022–: Deputy Prime Minister
- 2022–: Minister of Justice
- 2025–2025: Minister of Interior
- 2025–2025: Minister of Religious Services

Faction represented in the Knesset
- 2009–: Likud

Personal details
- Born: 22 June 1969 (age 57) Jerusalem
- Education: Hebrew University of Jerusalem

Yariv Gideon Levin (Hebrew: יריב גדעון לוין; born 22 June 1969) is an Israeli lawyer and politician who serves as Deputy Prime Minister, and Minister of Justice. He served as Speaker of the Knesset in December 2022, previously serving in that role from 2020 to 2021. He currently serves as a member of Knesset for Likud, and previously held the posts of Minister of Internal Security, Minister of Tourism, and Minister of Aliyah and Integration.

Levin has advocated reforms to Israel's judicial branch, most notably the 2023 Israeli judicial reform. Levin has refused to acknowledge Supreme Court President Yitzhak Amit since his appointment in 2025, in what has been branded a constitutional crisis.

== Biography ==
Levin was born in Jerusalem to Gail and Aryeh Levin, an Israel Prize laureate for linguistics. His mother's uncle, Eliyahu Lankin, was commander of the Altalena ship and a member of the first Knesset, representing Herut, whilst Menachem Begin was the Sandek at Levin's circumcision ceremony.

Levin studied at Boyar High School in Jerusalem. During his national service, he joined the IDF Intelligence Corps as an Arabic translator, and later served as commander of an Arabic translation course. In 1995 he published a dictionary of economic terms translated between Arabic, English and Hebrew.

Levin gained an LLB from the Hebrew University, and worked as a lawyer in the field of civil-commercial law. He married Yifat, daughter of former Knesset Member Ya'akov Shamai. They have three children and live in Modi'in.

=== Legal career ===
Levin took part in establishing the New Young Lawyers Faction, known as Mahatz, which participated in internal elections for Israel Bar Association' institutions in 1999. Levin, who headed the Faction list, was elected to represent the faction on the National Council and the Jerusalem District Committee. In the National Council elections, Levin was elected Vice Chairman of the Israel Bar Association. Levin was also appointed Head of the Bar Association's salaried lawyers committee. In the 2003 elections for the Bar Association's institutions, the New Young Lawyers Faction increased their power, and Levin became the designated acting Chairman of the Bar Association from 2003 to 2005.

During his time in the Bar Association, Levin took part in its legal aide project Schar Mitzvah, and led reforms in the rules of ethics for lawyers. Levin was among the initiators of the survey examining the conduct of judges in the courtrooms.

=== Political career ===
Levin began his public activities in Likud's student faction at the Hebrew University of Jerusalem, where he served as Spokesman and later as deputy chairman of the faction. In 1997, he headed a team that established the Likud branch in Modi'in, and was appointed the branch's chairman in 2003. Levin also served on a committee that supervised an internal Likud poll on the disengagement plan, and represented Members of the Knesset who opposed the plan in various legal proceedings.

In 2006 Likud chairman Benjamin Netanyahu appointed Levin to head the Likud committee for oversight of government authorities in order to co-ordinate Likud's opposition activities against the government and its then-Prime Minister Ehud Olmert. Levin filed an appeal to the Supreme Court against the Prime Minister, which resulted in the appointment of a Minister of Social Welfare after a long period of time during which this position was unoccupied.

==== Member of the Knesset ====
Levin ran for a spot on Likud's electoral list in the 2006 Knesset election. He was assigned the 43rd slot, and failed to enter the Knesset, as Likud only won twelve seats. Levin ran again ahead of the 2009 election, seeking a spot reserved for the Shephelah region. He was elected to the 21st slot on the Likud list and then to the Knesset as the party won 27 seats. Levin was sworn into office on 24 February 2009.

In August 2009, Levin was appointed Chairman of the Knesset House Committee, replacing Ze'ev Elkin. Later in 2009, Levin was chosen as the Knesset's representative to the Attorney General's selection committee during the 18th Knesset. He was unanimously chosen for the role again in 2013 during the 19th Knesset.

In 2010, Levin proposed the "Referendum bill", which required any transfer of Israeli territory to be approved via a referendum. Levin then chaired a joint subcommittee of the Knesset House and Law and Justice committees that debated the bill. the bill was voted into law in November 2010 and was superseded by Basic Law: Referendum in 2014.

Levin passed 40 laws during his first term in the Knesset. In 2009, a law drafted by Levin and Moshe Gafni abolished the role of Commissioner of Future Generations, who advised the Knesset on long-term planning, arguing the position served as an extension of the Judicial Branch. In 2011, Levin proposed a law that multiplied defamation penalties sixfold. Levin and Ze'ev Elkin (Note: The latter law had several additional sponsors - Robert Ilatov, Avraham Michaeli, Uri Ariel, Moshe Gafni, Uri Maklev and Carmel Shama-Hacohen) also proposed a law requiring public hearings for Supreme Court nominees. as well as a law that would alter the Judicial Selection Committee, replacing a representative of the Israel Bar Association with the association's chair. None of the three proposals were voted into law.

Levin sought re-election in Likud's 2012 Knesset primaries. He won the 9th largest number of votes, and was assigned the 11th slot on the party list. Likud ultimately decided on a joint run with Yisrael Beiteinu, and Levin was given the 15th slot on the joint list. He was re-elected in the 2013 Israeli legislative election. On 18 March 2013, Levin was appointed Chairman of the Coalition. He also served as chairman of the House Committee from February to April 2013 and beginning in June 2014. On 1 January 2015, Levin became Chairman of the Foreign Affairs and Defense Committee from January to March 2015 as part of a rotation agreement with previous chair Ze'ev Elkin. Elkin took Levin's place as Chairman of the House Committee.

==== Minister of Tourism ====
Levin sought re-election for a third time in 2015. He received the 9th most votes in the Likud primary, and was assigned the 10th slot on the party's list. Levin was appointed Minister of Internal Security and Minister of Tourism in the new government, he resigned the former role after 11 days to make way for Gilad Erdan, a Likud member who previously refused to hold office in the new government. Levin served as acting Minister of Aliyah and Integration from 24 December 2018 to 9 January 2019 after previous acting minister Benjamin Netanyahu was required to relinquish his ministerial positions by a supreme court ruling. (Note: Netanyahu had acted in the role for several days following the resignation of Sofa Landver)

==== Speaker of the Knesset ====
Following the formation of the thirty-fifth government of Israel, Levin was elected Speaker of the Knesset on 17 May 2020 with 71 votes in favor. He was replaced in the twenty-fourth Knesset by Mickey Levy on 13 June 2021. Levin briefly served as speaker again in the first weeks of the twenty-fifth Knesset from 13 to 29 December 2022.

==== Minister of Justice (2022–present) ====
After Israel's right-wing bloc emerged victorious at the 2022 Israeli legislative elections, Levin was appointed Deputy Prime Minister and Minister of Justice in the thirty-seventh government of Israel. On 4 January 2023, he announced plans to overhaul the country's judicial system. The plan seemed to weaken the Supreme Court of Israel by granting the government effective control over the Judicial Selection Committee, prohibiting the court from ruling on the constitutionality of certain laws and regulations, and granting the Knesset the power to override any court ruling by a simple majority. Levin's proposed changes to the judicial system sparked intense controversy, with some opposition leaders arguing that the plan amounts to an attempt at regime change and anti-government protests commencing shortly after the plan's unveiling, including near Levin's residence. Levin fiercely defended the plan, frequently arguing that the supreme court's power to strike down legislation is un-democratic, having stated that "time after time, people who we didn't elect decide for us". On 1 January 2024, the Supreme Court overturned, by a narrow 8-to-7 majority, a Knesset law blocking the court's use of the "reasonableness" doctrine was unconstitutional. At the same time, by a broad 12–3 majority, the court reaffirmed its right to review the constitutionality of laws. The rulings were seen as a major defeat for Netanyahu and Levin.

In March 2023, controversy arose when Levin was seen attending a Purim party at the home of Raffi Chaim-Kedoshim, a known criminal. Chaim-Kedoshim had been convicted of various crimes, including kidnapping and extortion, and had served prison time. It was later revealed that other senior Likud members, including Israel Katz, Miri Regev and Dudi Amsalem, were also present at the event.

In October 2024, as a reaction to a speech of publisher and head of Haaretz Group, Amos Schocken, were Schocken criticized the governments policy as a form of "apartheid", named Palestinian protesters in West Bank as "freedom fighters" and urged for sanctions against Israel, Levin wrote a letter to Attorney General Gali Baharav-Miara requesting that she approve a proposed law that would criminalize actions by Israelis to "promote or encourage applying international sanctions on Israel, its leaders, its security forces, and the citizens of Israel," with a ten-year jail sentence, which will be doubled in wartime.

From 2023 until 2025, Levin had blocked the accession of Amit as permanent president who was nominated based on the long-standing seniority-based convention, arguing he possesses discretion regarding the committee's convening, the identity of the candidates to be presented for a vote, and the timing of such a vote, but was forced to call a vote following a unanimous High Court decision although also seen as a part of the judicial reform attempt. Amit was appointed Chief Justice on 26 January 2025, and sworn in on 13 February 2025 by Israeli president Isaac Herzog with Levin boycotting the inauguration and refusing to meet Amit in what has been branded as a constitutional crisis. In March 2025 Levin initiated proceedings to fire Attorney General Gali Baharav-Miara with the opposition branding it as an assault on the rule of law.

A draft of a new judicial reform was presented on 9 January 2025 as a “compromise” between Levin and Foreign Minister Gideon Sa’ar. According to the proposal, the majority necessary for high court appointments will be five out of nine, instead of seven. However, every High Court appointment will require the agreement of at least one representative from the opposition and one from the government. Appointments to other judicial positions will require the approval of one member of the government, one from the opposition, and one judge. The proposal also included a mechanism to prevent a deadlock in Supreme Court appointments. If a year passes with two vacancies, the government and opposition will each propose three candidates, out of which the other side must choose one. The proposal was passed and will apply as a law beginning with the next Knesset after the elections in 2026.

==== Minister of Interior and Minister of Religious Services (2025–present) ====
Levin was appointed the Minister of Interior and Minister of Religious Services in July 2025 following Shas' exit from the coalition. This appointment was only valid for three months, and these ministries have been vacant since October, 2025.

== Political opinions ==
Levin holds hawkish views with respect to the Israeli–Palestinian conflict. He opposes the creation of a Palestinian state, and believes in the right of Jews to remain in all parts of the land of Israel. Levin has stated that Israel has an absolute right to the West Bank and advocates for gradual annexation through settlement expansion and enforcement of control while minimizing the Arab population in annexed areas.

In 2013, during negotiations between Israel and the Palestinians, Levin said that if Netanyahu were to advance an agreement that includes evacuation of settlements, he would resign from the Knesset.

After the Israeli military police in July 2024 visited Sde Teiman detention camp to detain nine Israeli soldiers suspected of abuse of a Palestinian prisoner, Levin said that "harsh pictures of soldiers being arrested" were "impossible to accept".

Levin often criticizes the judicial system in Israel, claiming a minority extreme leftist group has taken over the system and tries to use it in order to define the values Israel lives by. According to Levin, there is a broad gap between the Supreme Court's rulings on religious and state affairs and the traditional opinions of the majority of the public, a situation which threatens the existence of the State of Israel. Levin explained the need in changing the supreme judges appointment system by pointing out that the present judges are not in favor of residential segregation: “Arabs buy apartments in Jewish communities in the Galilee and this causes Jews to leave these cities, because they are not prepared to live with Arabs. We need to ensure that the Supreme Court has justices who understand this.”

Despite being a Secular Jew, Levin has criticized Reform Jews, especially those living in the United States. Following the Israeli government's decision to expand the egalitarian section of the Western Wall. Levin said that "Reform Jews in the United States are a dying world. Assimilation is taking place on a vast scale. They are not even tracking this properly in their communities. It is evidenced by the fact that a man who calls himself a Reform rabbi stands there with a priest and officiates at the wedding of the daughter of Hillary Clinton and no one condemns it, thereby legitimizing it."
