= Asher Arieli =

Israeli rabbi

Rabbi Asher Arieli
- אשר אריאלי
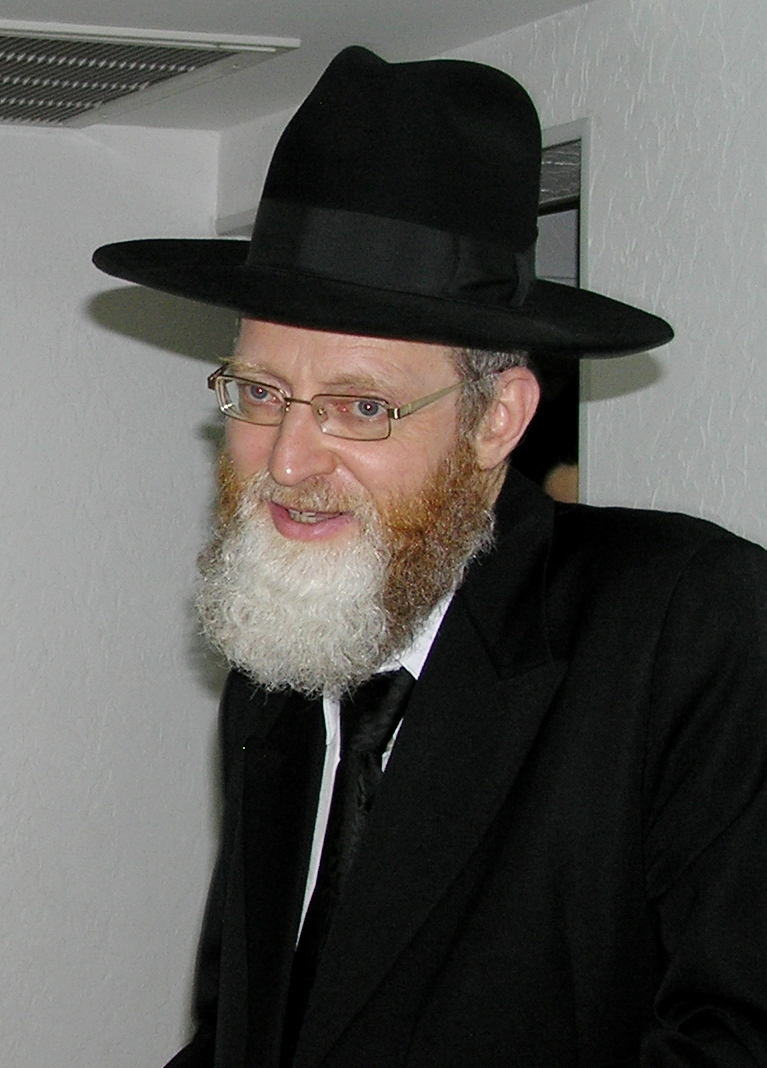
- R' Asher
- Title: Rabbi Asher Arieli

Personal life
- Born: 1957 (age 68–69) Bnei Brak, Israel
- Spouse: Malka Arieli

Religious life
- Religion: Judaism
- Denomination: Orthodox

Jewish leader
- Position: Senior Lecturer
- Yeshiva: Mir Yeshiva
- Residence: Jerusalem, Israel

Asher Arieli (Hebrew: אשר אריאלי, Yiddish: אשר אריאלי; born 1957) is an Israeli rabbi and the senior lecturer at the Mir Yeshiva in Israel. He is globally renowned for his lectures on Talmud and is widely recognized as a leading figure in the haredi community. He presently delivers the largest Talmudic lecture by attendance in the world with over 1000 daily attendees. His primary, daily shiur begins at 12:20pm and is streamed live at Kol Haloshon.

== Family life ==
Arieli is married to Rebbetzin Malka, the daughter of Hagaon Rabbi Nachum Partzovitz, the late rosh yeshiva of Mir. Arieli is the son of rabbi Chaim Yaakov Arieli, author of Be'er Yaakov (באר יעקב). Rabbi Chaim Yaakov Arieli was the son of Rabbi Yitzhak Arieli, author of Einaim L'Mishpat (עינים למשפט) and mashgiach ruchani of Mercaz HaRav. Rabbi Mordechai Ilan, the son-in-law of Yitzhak Arieli is Asher's paternal uncle. Reb Chaim Yaakov's wife is the sister of rabbi Moshe Sternbuch, as are the wives of rabbi Meshulam Dovid Soloveitchik and Dayan Chanoch Ehrentreu making the three rabbis his uncles. Reb Asher's brother Rabbi Shlomo Arieli is the author of a critical edition of the novellae of rabbi Akiva Eiger.

== Lectures ==
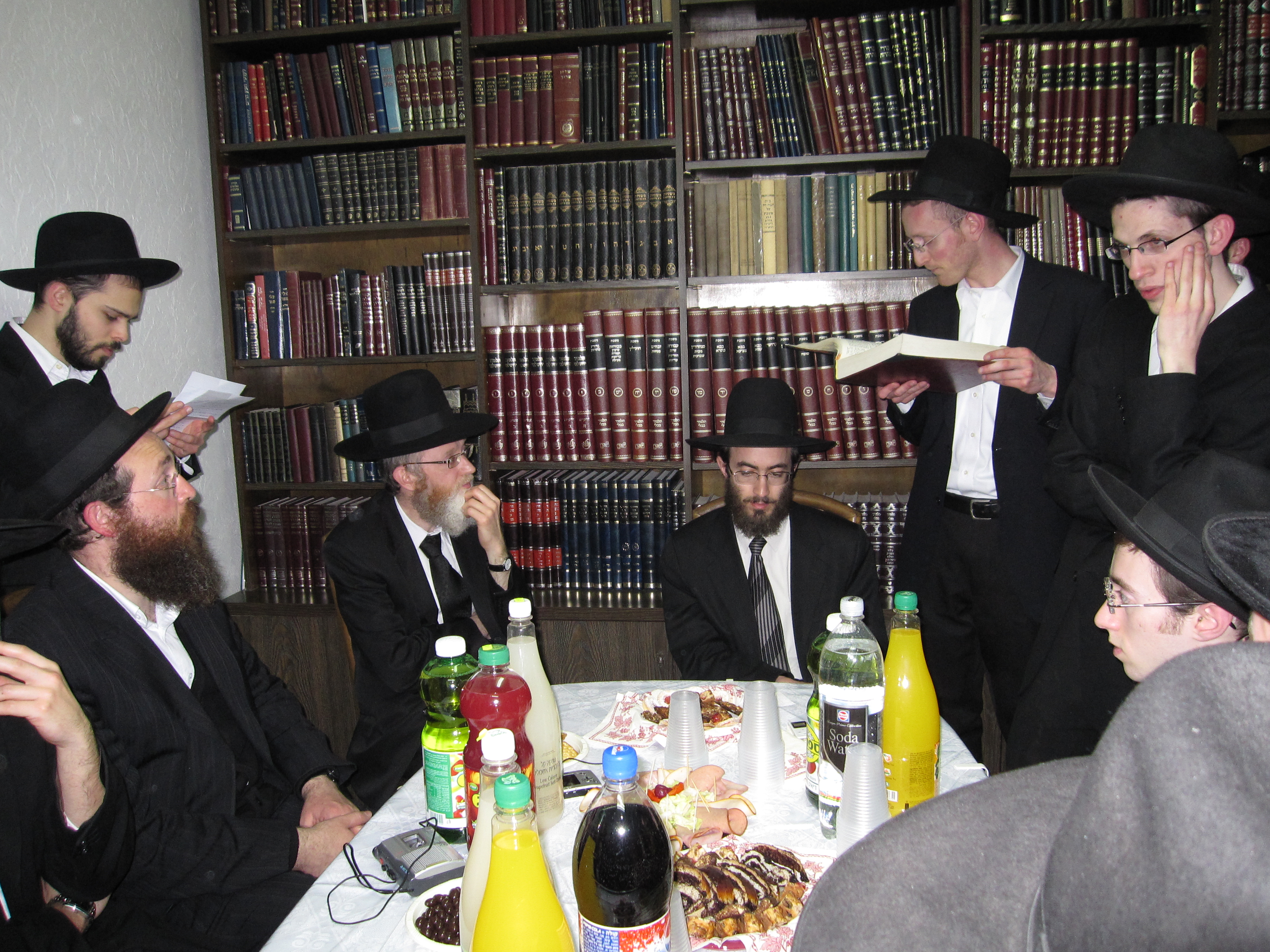
Arieli at a siyum.

Arieli has delivered guest lectures for such events as the Agudat Yisrael annual Yarchei Kallah. The last 3 cycles of Arieli's lectures on most of the major tractates are available by telephone and for download.

Although Arieli daily morning lectures are in Yiddish, his mother tongue is Hebrew and he only learnt Yiddish in order to understand the lectures which he heard in the Mir Yeshiva. Lectures in the Mir are often given in Yiddish.
