= Ruth Ronnen =

Israeli jurist (born 1962)

- רות רונן
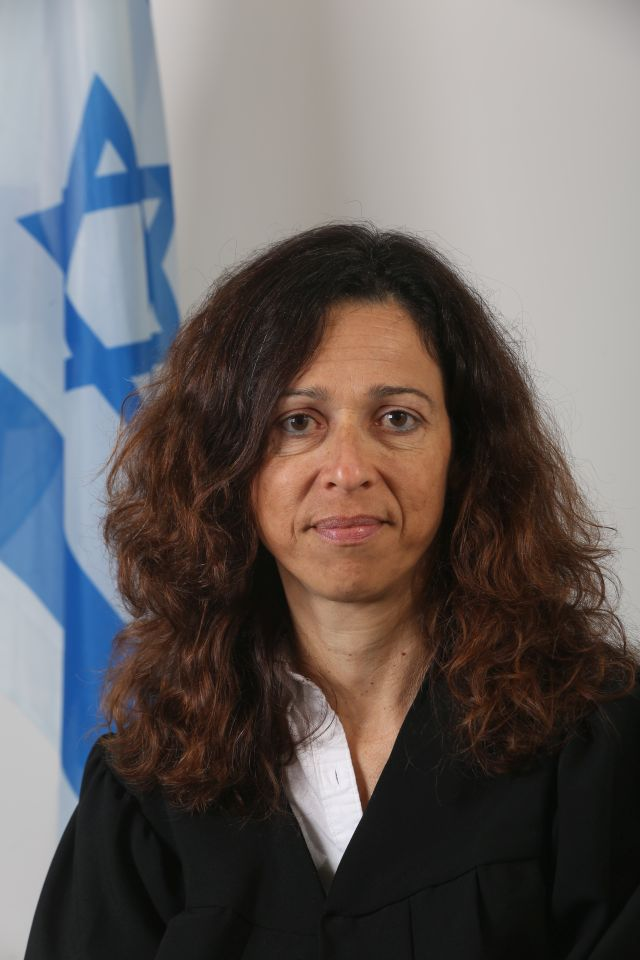
- Ruth Ronnen

Justice of the Supreme Court of Israel
- Incumbent
- Assumed office 9 June 2022

Personal details
- Education: Hebrew University of Jerusalem (LLB); Tel Aviv University (MA)

Ruth Ronnen (Hebrew: רות רונן; born 1962) is an Israeli jurist who has served as a justice of the Supreme Court of Israel since 2022. She has been described as "liberal".

== Early life and education ==
Ronnen was born in 1962. In her youth she attended the Hebrew University High School. She served in the Israeli Defense Forces (IDF) from 1980 to 1982. In 1986, she completed her law studies magna cum laude at the Hebrew University of Jerusalem and was admitted to the Israeli Bar two years later. Ronnen also became a member of the New York Bar in 1990.

In 2002, Ronnen earned a master's degree in law from Tel Aviv University. In 2021, she received a master's degree in philosophy with highest honors from Tel Aviv University.

== Career ==
Ronnen worked as an associate attorney in New York from 1990 to 1991.

In 1995, Ronnen was appointed as a judge in the Tel Aviv Magistrate's Court. From 1998, she also served as an adjunct lecturer at Tel Aviv University.

In 2005, Ronnen was appointed as a judge for the Tel Aviv District Court.

In 2009, Ronnen was one of the candidates to succeed attorney general Menachem Mazuz.

Ronnen served as a judge for the economic department at the Tel Aviv District Court from 2010 until her appointment to the Supreme Court in 2022.

=== Supreme Court ===
In February 2022, the Judicial Appointments Committee appointed Ronnen as a justice on the Supreme Court. She was backed by Supreme Court President Esther Hayut. Her appointment was opposed by then Interior Minister Ayelet Shaked. Ronnen had previously clerked for former Supreme Court President Meir Shamgar. She was sworn into office on 9 June 2022.
