= Neve Sha'anan, Jerusalem =

Coordinates: 31°46′26.61″N 35°12′5.72″E

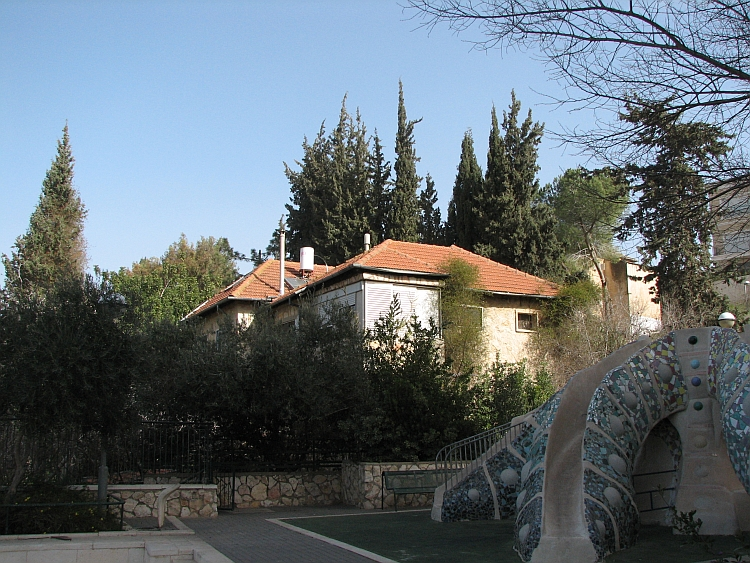
Neve Sha'anan, view from park

Neve Sha'anan (Hebrew: נווה שאנן, lit. Tranquil Oasis) is a small neighborhood in central Jerusalem. It is located between the Israel Museum and the Givat Ram campus of the Hebrew University of Jerusalem, bordering Nayot.

== History ==
The first three homes were built in 1929 by the Neve Sha'anan society. The name of the neighborhood was based on Isaiah 33:20. The planning principles were similar to those employed by Ricard Kaufmann, who designed the garden suburbs of Jerusalem during the British Mandate.

Two apartment buildings at the end of Neve Sha'anan Street were built to house professors of the Hebrew University.

In 1948, during the Battle for Jerusalem, there was a temporary prisoner of war camp for Palestinian-Arab civilians above Neve Sha’anan, in the area where the Israel Museum is situated today. The camp was closed once the siege of Jerusalem ended and the road to Tel Aviv reopened.

== Landmarks ==
The Yitzhak Rabin Youth Hostel and Guesthouse is located at the edge of the neighborhood.

== Notable residents ==
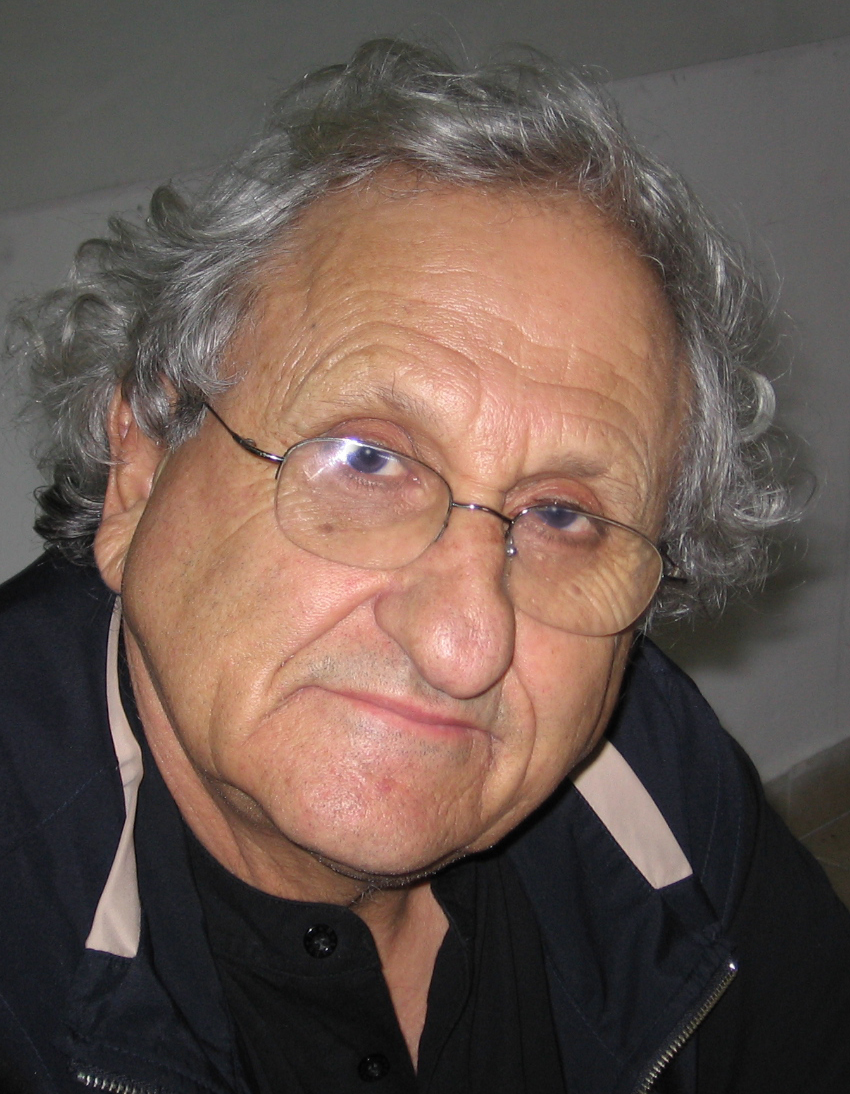
A.B. Yehoshua

- A.B. Yehoshua (1936-2022), novelist, essayist, and playwright
