= Yechiel Kasher =

Israeli jurist (born 1961)

- יחיאל כשר
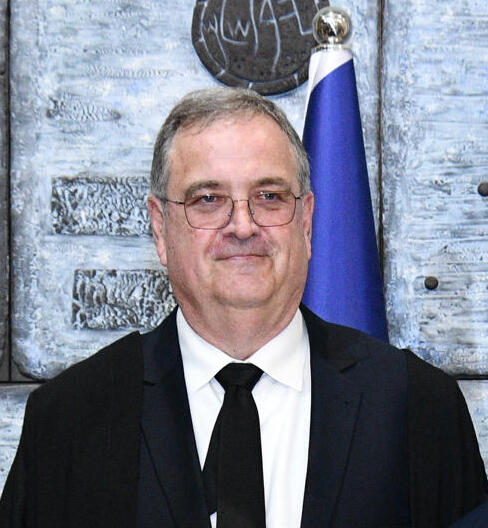
- Yechiel Kasher

Justice of the Supreme Court of Israel
- Incumbent
- Assumed office 9 June 2022

Personal details
- Education: Tel Aviv University (LLB)

Yechiel Meir Kasher (Hebrew: יחיאל כשר; born 1961) is an Israeli jurist who has served as a justice of the Supreme Court of Israel since 2022. As a lawyer, Kasher focused on civil and commercial litigation. He has been described both as a centrist and as a centrist who leans slightly conservative.

== Early life and education ==
Kasher was born in Israel in 1961. He served in the Israeli Defense Forces (IDF) from 1979 to 1982. In 1986, he completed his law studies magna cum laude at Tel Aviv University and was admitted to the Israeli Bar in 1987.

== Legal career ==
From 1987 to 1992, Kasher worked as an associate attorney at a law firm.

Kasher was head of the litigation department and a partner at law firm Tadmor Levy & Co., one of the largest law firms in Israel, from 1993 until his appointment to the Supreme Court in 2022.

=== Supreme Court ===
In February 2022, Kasher was appointed Supreme Court Justice. Kasher was supported by the two Israel Bar Association representatives on the Judicial Appointments Committee. They insisted that one of the four new appointments to the court must be a lawyer from private practice. He was sworn in on 9 June 2022.
