= Khaled Kabub =

Israeli jurist (born 1958)

- خالد كبوب
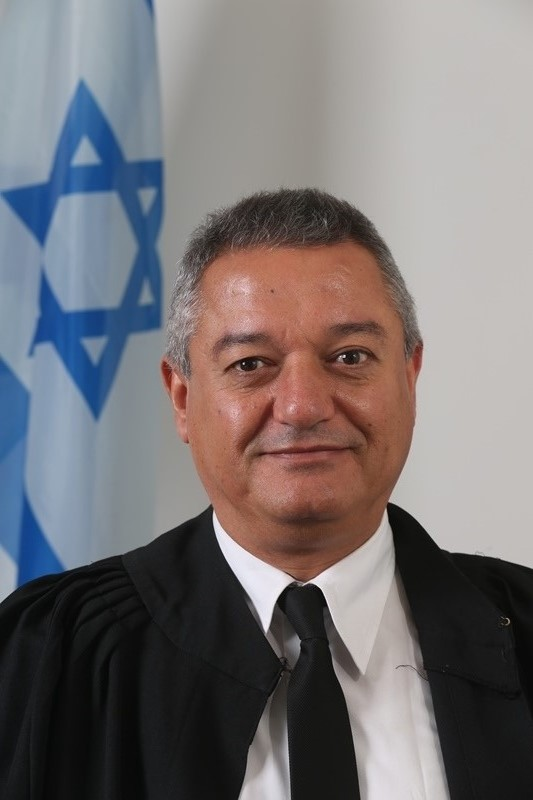

Justice of the Supreme Court of Israel
- Incumbent
- Assumed office 9 May 2022

Judge of the Tel Aviv District Court
- In office 2003–2022

Judge of the Netanya Magistrate's Court
- In office 1997–2003

Personal details
- Born: 1958 (age 67–68) Jaffa, Israel
- Education: Tel Aviv University; University of California, Berkeley (LL.B.), (LL.M.)
- Occupation: Judge, lawyer

Khaled Kabub (Arabic: خالد كبوب, Hebrew: חאלד כבוב; born 1958) is an Israeli Arab jurist who serves as a justice of the Supreme Court of Israel since 2022, being the first permanent Muslim member. He is considered a liberal justice in the Supreme Court.

== Early life and education ==
Khaled Kabub was born in Jaffa to a Muslim family. His father was a bus driver for the Dan Bus Company. After graduating from high school in 1975, he studied at Tel Aviv University, completing a Bachelor of Arts in history and Islam in 1981 and a Bachelor of Arts in law in 1988. In 2011, he completed a master's degree in commercial law with honors, which was awarded jointly by Tel Aviv University and the University of California, Berkeley.

== Legal career ==
From 1989 to 1997, he worked as a lawyer in private practice. In September 1997, he was appointed a judge on the Netanya Magistrate's Court, and in 2003, he was appointed a judge on the Tel Aviv District Court. Since that year, he has also taught courses in corporations and economics at Bar-Ilan University and Ono Academic College. In August 2010, he was appointed to serve in the economics department of the court. In 2014, he was added to the list of candidates for the Supreme Court.

Kabub gained a reputation as an outstanding jurist in the economic, civil, and criminal fields. Notable cases he tried include those of business magnate Nochi Dankner, whom he sentenced to two years imprisonment and a NIS 800,000 fine for securities fraud, and former judge and director of the Israel Electric Corporation Dan Cohen, whom he sentenced to six years imprisonment and a NIS 10 million fine for fraud, breach of trust, and obstruction of justice.

Kabub was a candidate to replace Supreme Court judge Yoram Danziger upon his retirement in February 2018. Two days before the selection committee was scheduled to meet to make its decision, he withdrew his candidacy. In February 2022, Kabub was selected to join the Supreme Court, becoming its first permanent Muslim judge.

In April 2023, a group of protesters led by the right-wing Btsalmo organization and accompanied by far-right Otzma Yehudit MK Almog Cohen rallied outside Kabub's home in Jaffa after it was revealed that Kabub had accepted an appeal from the attorneys of a suspected rapist, overturning the Jerusalem District Court's decision to keep him in custody until the end of proceedings. Part of his reasoning for releasing the suspect was that there was "no significant use of physical violence" in the rape, though he noted that any case of rape has "an inherent element of violence." Right-wing activist Shay Glick made two complaints about Kabub, charging that he violated the judges' ethics code when he gave an unauthorized media interview and sat in trial of a legal dispute involving his children. In March 2024 the ombudsman for Israel's judiciary ruled that these complaints were justified.
