= Israel Bar Association =

Bar association of Israeli lawyers

- לִשְׁכַּת עוֹרְכֵי הַדִּין בְּיִשְׂרָאֵל
- Type: Bar association
- Headquarters: Tel Aviv
- Region served: Israel
- Head: Amit Becher
- Website: https://www.israelbar.org.il/

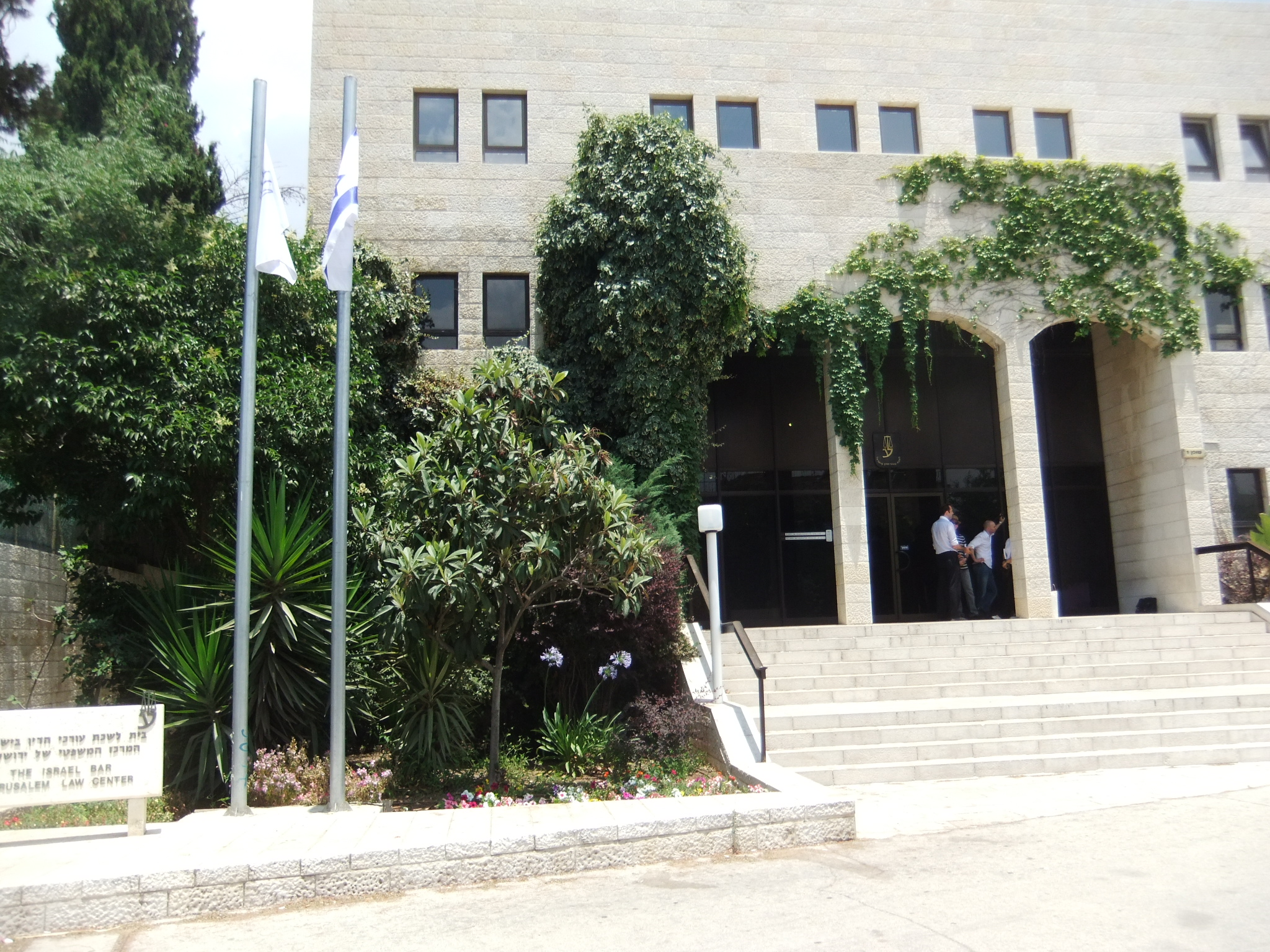
Israeli Bar Association, Jerusalem

Israel Bar Association (Hebrew: לִשְׁכַּת עוֹרְכֵי הַדִּין בְּיִשְׂרָאֵל; abbr. IBA) is the bar association for all Israeli lawyers.

== History ==
The Israel Bar Association was established by The Bar Association Law, 1961. The law went into effect in March 1962.

The Association is organized as a corporation, with a Central Committee, a National Assembly and five districts. Membership is mandatory for lawyers licensed in Israel. The top positions are filled by elections held every four years.

The law empowers the Israel bar with mandatory authority to regulate ethical and disciplinary matters, to accredit interns, conduct the bar examination twice a year, and issue licenses. As a matter of discretionary authority, the law empowers the Israel Bar Association to take actions for the benefit of its members, and to take legal actions against those trespassing on the profession. It is considered a self-regulated "guild", created under the concept that lawyers are better equipped to discipline themselves without government or judicial supervision. That is unlike the United States, where lawyers must seek admission from the courts in each state in which they wish to practice, and they must obtain additional separate licenses from federal courts. Membership in the Israel Bar Association is compulsory, and it is the only bar association recognized under the law. Under the umbrella of the Israel Bar Association, different committees devoted to almost every imaginable aspect of the law convene on a voluntary basis. Those committees, however, have a very limited role in the daily practice of attorneys and have minimal influence in the process of drafting and passing laws.

Two standing committees of the IBA are the Mandatory Mediation Committee, and the "related organ", the "Schar Mitzvah" (Pro Bono Program) Committee.

== See also ==
- Israeli law
