= Prosecution of Moshe Katsav =

Trial of Moshe Katsav
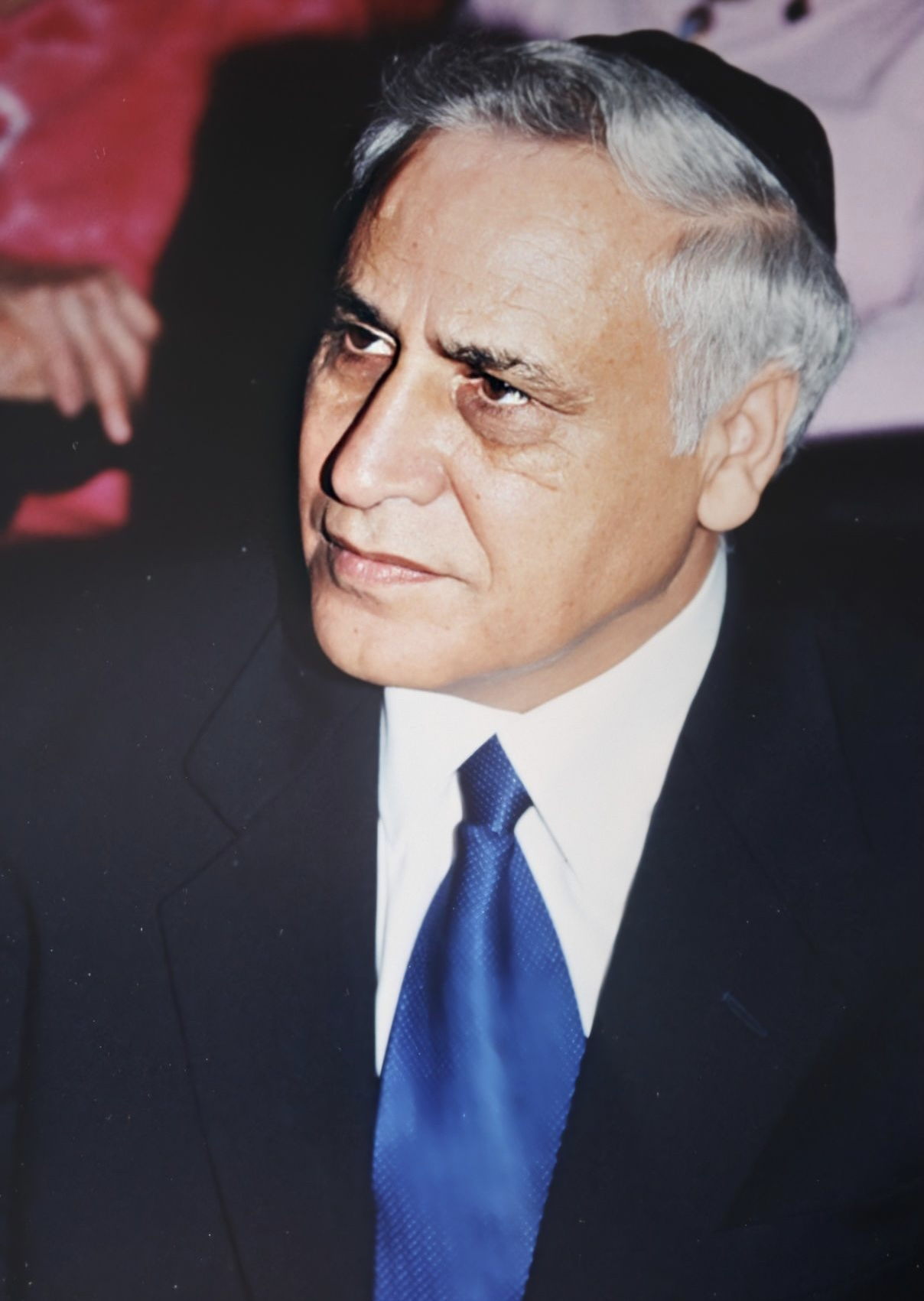
- Court: Tel Aviv District Court
- Full case name: The State of Israel vs. Moshe Katsav
- Decided: 30 December 2010 (verdict); 22 March 2011 (sentencing)

Court membership
- Judges sitting: George Karra; Miriam Sokolov; Judith Shevach

In 2006, allegations of rape and sexual harassment surfaced against Moshe Katsav, the incumbent president of Israel. Criminal charges were investigated, but indictments could not be filed due to the presidency holding sovereign immunity. An effort to impeach Katsav did not succeed. On 28 June 2007, Katsav reached a plea bargain which included his early resignation from office. He left office on 1 July 2007. The plea bargain was ultimately abandoned, and Katsav faced trial. On 30 December 2010, Katsav was found guilty of "rape, sexual harassment, committing an indecent act while using force, harassing a witness and obstruction of justice", and was sentenced to seven years in prison and two years' probation. He was the first former president of Israel to be sentenced to prison. His prison sentence began on 7 December 2011. On 18 December 2016, a parole board granted him early release from prison.

== Complaints, investigation ==
In July 2006, Katsav complained to the Attorney General of Israel, Menachem Mazuz, that a female employee was blackmailing him. The investigation quickly turned against Katsav as the employee, referred to as A. (later identified as Orly Revivo), alleged sexual offenses. A, who worked with Katsav when he was Minister of Tourism, claimed that Katsav raped her twice and sexually harassed her in various other ways. Katsav was accused of raping and sexually harassing up to ten women. Police raided his house and seized computers and documents on 22 August. There were calls for him to resign or suspend himself from the presidency. Katsav was questioned under caution on 23 August.

On 7 September, receiving complaints from at least four different women (according to IBA's correspondent for police affairs), the Israel Police determined that they had enough evidence for an indictment. Amid this news breaking, Katsav did not attend the ceremonial swearing-in Dorit Beinisch as President of the Israeli Supreme Court. On 13 September, the Knesset House Committee approved Katsav's request for leave of absence. The ceremony, normally held at the president's house, was moved to the Knesset.

Police said that seven women had testified against Katsav and the allegations included "breach of trust, fraud, and involvement in illegal wiretapping." On 18 September, Attorney-General Mazuz stated that the likelihood of Katsav being the victim of a plot was "fairly slim." By 21 September, the number of complaints rose to eight.

On 15 October 2006, police said the complaints of five of the women would not be pursued because the statute of limitations had run out. On 29 October, Attorney-General Menachem Mazuz advised Katsav to step down. While denying the allegations, he said he would resign if indicted.

== Suspension of criminal proceedings, attempted impeachment ==
On 23 January 2007, Attorney-General Mazuz announced that he would consider charging Katsav with rape, sexual harassment, breach of trust, obstruction of justice, harassment of a witness and fraud. The president is immune from prosecution while in office and could only be tried after the end of his term in August 2007 or after his resignation. The final decision on indictment would be made after a hearing where Katsav could present his case.

On 24 January 2007, Katsav held a press conference where he accused journalists of persecuting and judging him before all the evidence was in. He claimed that the media were hostile to his presidency from the start. He accused Channel 2 of conducting a witch-hunt. Katsav declared his intention to suspend himself temporarily but refused to step down unless indicted. The speech drew shock and condemnation from journalists, politicians, and legal figures. In a talk scheduled minutes after Katsav's speech, Prime Minister Ehud Olmert called on him to resign from the presidency.

Katsav took a three-month leave of absence approved by the Knesset on 25 January. Knesset Speaker Dalia Itzik assumed the office of president in the interim in a "caretaker" capacity.

On 7 March 2007, an attempt to impeach Katsav failed.

In March 2009, Katsav's brother Lior said the decision to indict Katsav was tantamount to a "blood libel".

== Plea bargain, resignation from office, indictment ==
On 28 June 2007, Katsav's lawyers reached a plea bargain in which Katsav would plead guilty to several counts of sexual harassment and indecent acts and receive a suspended jail sentence. He would pay compensation to two of the victims. The rape charges brought by A. would be dropped, as well as Katsav's charges of blackmail. This led to a public outcry, particularly from women's rights organizations. Opinion polls showed that 70 percent of the public objected to the deal. A protest at Rabin Square in Tel Aviv drew a large crowd. The Attorney-General claimed the agreement would spare the humiliation of the presidency. Katsav's attorneys said they agreed to avoid an arduous trial.

Per the plea bargain, Katsav resigned from office effective on 1 July 2007 (his seven-year term was scheduled to run out constitutionally on 15 July 2007).

On 30 October 2007, the state prosecutor told the High Court of Justice that it had changed its mind about the indictment based on evidence from the two key complainants. The prosecution cited a meeting with Katsav's attorneys that highlighted contradictions in their testimony, including an affectionate letter from one of the complainants after the two rapes allegedly occurred. The move garnered harsh criticism from the complainants' attorneys. Katsav called off the plea bargain in April 2008. According to one of his lawyers, Avigdor Feldman, he believed the prosecution did not have enough evidence to convict him.

== Trial ==
In March 2009, Katsav was formally indicted for rape and other sexual offenses in the Tel Aviv District Court. His trial took place between August 2009 and June 2010 before a panel of three judges, consisting of Presiding Judge George Karra and Justices Miriam Sokolov and Yehudit Shevach. Katsav's testimony began in January 2010. The prosecutors were Ronit Amiel and Nissim Merom, of the State Prosecutor's Office Central District Office. Katsav's defense team consisted of attorneys Zion Amir, Avigdor Feldman, and Avraham Lavi. The trial was held behind closed doors (as is customary in trials of sexual offenses) and a media ban was imposed on the details of the trial, witnesses and testimony. The ban was lifted in August 2010 when trial protocols were released.

Without forensic evidence, prosecutors built their case almost entirely on witness testimony. According to legal experts, the similarities in the testimonies of the victims, who could not have known one another, would be instrumental in his conviction.

=== Conviction ===
On 30 December 2010, the three judges unanimously found Katsav guilty of "rape, sexual harassment, committing an indecent act while using force, harassing a witness and obstruction of justice". Presiding Judge Karra read the verdict which stated that Katsav "engaged in a campaign of vilification against the plaintiffs." Katsav faced a maximum sentence of 49 years. Prime Minister Benjamin Netanyahu said that it was "a sad day for Israel", but that the verdict shows that in Israel "all are equal before the law, and that every woman has exclusive rights to her body." The conviction was described as "landmark" and "unprecedented", and the story featured prominently in the international media. The sentencing phase began on 22 February 2011.

On 22 March 2011, Moshe Katsav was sentenced to seven years in prison and two years' probation for rape, indecent acts, sexual harassment and obstruction of justice, becoming the first former President of Israel to be sentenced to prison. In addition, he was ordered to pay one of the women compensation totaling 100,000 NIS and another a sum of 25,000 NIS. Katsav's lawyer Zion Amir told reporters that the sentence would be appealed to the Supreme Court of Israel.

In July 2011, it was cleared for publication that Katsav was under police investigation on suspicion of using private investigators to harass witnesses and a complainant. Police suspected the investigators were trying to obtain new evidence to undermine their credibility. It was thought that Katsav hired the investigators after he was found guilty and before the Supreme Court appeal was filed. Katsav, his brothers Lior and Yoram, and his son Noam were questioned for an hour by National Fraud Investigations Unit officers on suspicion of witness harassment, tampering, and invasion of privacy.

In May 2011, Supreme Court Justice Yoram Danziger granted Katsav's motion to delay his entrance to prison until the Supreme Court heard his appeal. Deliberations on the appeal began on 7 August 2011 and were conducted by a three-judge panel consisting of Justices Edna Arbel, Miriam Naor, and Salim Joubran. Katsav's attorney suggested that his client was sexually involved with one of the alleged victims, but no rape occurred. He also suggested that the plaintiffs' testimonies were filled with contradictions. When deliberations resumed on 10 August, Katsav's attorney suggested that his client's actions did not constitute anything beyond "an ordinary hug". Deliberations on the appeal adjourned on 11 August. The court delivered its opinion on 10 November, unanimously upholding Katsav's conviction and sentence. The three-judge panel stated that they refrained from assessing the truth of the statements made by the accusers and otherwise rejected possibly exculpatory evidence. Justice Salim Joubran stated that Katsav "fell from the loftiest heights to the deepest depths. Such a senior official should be a role model to his subordinates. Every woman has a right to her own body. A right to dignity. A right to freedom. No one has the liberty to take any of those from her". Katsav was given until 7 December to put his affairs in order.

== Prison term ==
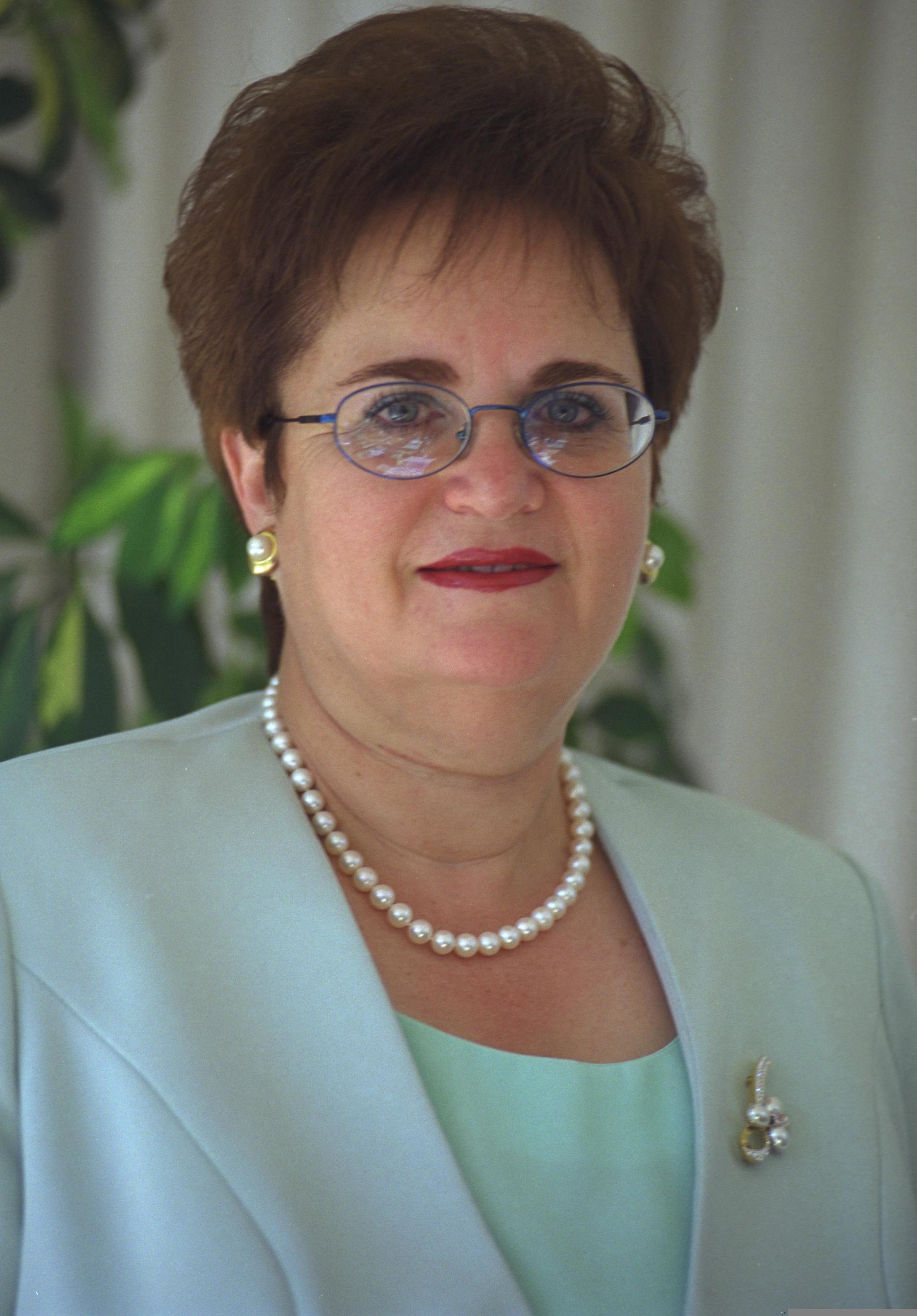
Gila Katsav, 2001

Following the decision, Katsav's family turned to several politicians, asking that Katsav's home, already surrounded by stone walls put up by Shin Bet's Protective Security Department, be declared a "temporary prison", and that he be allowed to serve his sentence there. In a letter to Public Security Minister Yitzhak Aharonovich, Katsav's brother Lior wrote that while in prison, his brother could be exposed to convicts whose presidential pardon requests he had rejected and claimed that he knew state secrets that could be compromised in prison. Aharonovich rejected that request, with sources close to him stating that prisoners were only permitted to serve their sentences at home in extremely rare cases.

Katsav arrived at Maasiyahu Prison in Ramla at 10:08 a.m. on 7 December 2011 to begin serving his sentence. Before departing for prison, he addressed journalists outside his home and maintained his innocence. Dozens of police officers were deployed to the prison to maintain order, and there was a large domestic and foreign media presence. Prison authorities determined that Katsav did not pose a suicide risk, and it was decided that the cameras in his cell would only be activated when his cellmate was absent.

Katsav was Israel Prison Service inmate #1418989. His cell was in the prison's Torani cellblock, a special block for religious prisoners. Though considered less harsh than other blocs, inmates in the Torani bloc have no access to television or newspapers. Prisoners are woken at 4:30 a.m. for morning prayers, pray three times a day, and spend most of the day in two seminaries studying Torah and other sacred Jewish texts. Shlomo Benizri, another former politician in prison for corruption, was Katsav's cellmate until his 2012 release. During his sentence, Katsav was bullied and harassed by convicted mass murderer Ami Popper, who Katsav had refused to pardon during his term in office. Popper's behavior resulted in his being transferred to another prison.

It was announced on 15 October 2012 that Israel's President Shimon Peres received a formal request to pardon Katsav. The request came from Katsav's wife, Gila.

The prison parole board rejected a request by Moshe Katsav for a conditional early release from prison on 6 April 2016. It is allowed by Israeli law to release a prisoner after serving two-thirds of a term. The parole board decided that Katsav, who always maintained he was innocent and never expressed any regret for his actions and also refused to take part in rehabilitation programs, could continue to harass the victims and still posed a risk to women.

=== Release ===
On 18 December 2016, the parole board granted Katsav early release, announcing that he had expressed regret for his actions before it, even though he had failed to do so publicly. The parole board delayed his release for a week, allowing prosecutors to consider whether to appeal. On 21 December 2016, Katsav was released from prison after the State Attorney decided not to appeal the Parole Board's decision for early release.

Katsav served a total of 5 years and 15 days of his 7-year sentence. The Prisoner Rehabilitation Authority imposed parole restrictions to be followed for the remainder of his 7-year sentence. Under the terms of his parole, he was prohibited from making any statements to the media or leaving the country. He was required to attend rehabilitation and visit a psychologist once a week, attend daily Torah study sessions, and remain at his home under a curfew from 10 PM to 6 AM. He was also forbidden from discussing or defaming his victims or holding any position where women are his subordinates.

In August 2017, President Reuven Rivlin rejected an appeal from Katsav to cancel the conditions of his parole. A parole board rejected a request to lift his nighttime curfew in November 2017. In April 2018, the Lod District Court rejected an appeal to cancel his nighttime curfew.
