= Israeli law in the West Bank settlements =

Application of Israeli state law to Israeli settlements in Area C of the West Bank

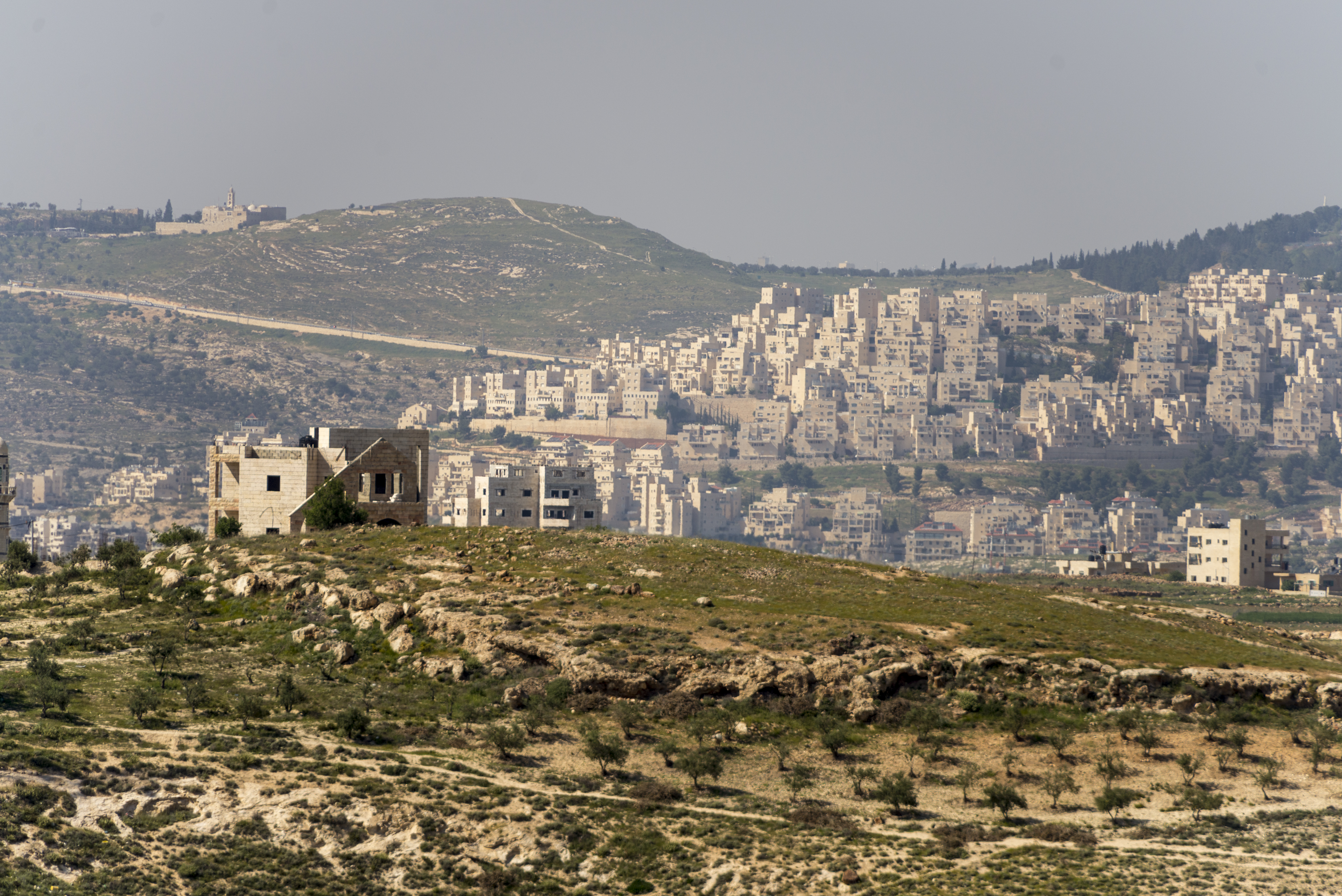
An Israeli settlement in the West Bank.

Israeli law is enforced in Israeli settlements and among Israeli civilians in Area C of the West Bank, a Palestinian territory under military occupation and therefore otherwise subject to military law. Some provisions are applied on a personal basis, such that it applies to Israeli residents rather than territory. Application of the laws has created "enclaves" of Israeli law in the Israeli-occupied West Bank, and the terms "enclave law" and "enclave-based justice" describe the resulting legal system.

In parallel, other portions of Israeli law, including Israeli criminal law, are applied to Israelis on a personal basis in the West Bank. Since January 2018, all laws proposed in the Knesset are actively considered vis à vis their application to the Israeli settlements in the West Bank.

The existence of a dual system of laws for Israelis and Palestinians in the West Bank has been used as evidence for the claim that Israel practices apartheid in the region.

== Terminology ==
The term "enclave law" was coined in a 1987 article by Amnon Rubinstein, an Israeli scholar of constitutional law. Rubinstein noted regarding the legal system for the West Bank, that:

once perceived as an 'escrow' under the rules of international law – that is as a trust – they have become a 'legal mongrel' and have gradually been incorporated in practice into the realm of Israel's rule.

In a 2009 report authored by Virginia Tilley, the South African Human Sciences Research Council wrote that "The outcome of the extraterritorial application of Israeli legislation on a personal basis, combined with the enclave law as described above, is that a settler lives within the framework of the West Bank law only in a very partial way". The report then quoted Rubinstein's 1986 Hebrew work:

A resident of Ma’ale Adumim, for instance, is supposedly subject to the Military Government and to the local Jordanian law, but in fact he lives according to the laws of Israel both with respect to his personal law and with respect to the local municipality wherein he lives. The Military Government is nothing more than a symbol, through which Israeli law and governance operate.

=== The concept in Israeli courts ===
The concept and application of Israeli law in the West Bank settlements has been described numerous times in Israeli courts. Examples include a 2004 case, Yinon Food Manufacturing and Marketing Ltd v. Qaraan, with respect to a dispute between a Palestinian and their Israeli-settlement-based employer, (Note: The court noted: "The legal character, from the point of view of internal Israeli law, of the Israeli settlement as an 'enclave' – which is not de facto subject to the law applying in that territory – is what renders the connection between the delict and the country whose law would normally have been the law of the place of its perpetration – to coincidental.") a 2006 Supreme Court case, Peace Now S.A.L. Educational Enterprises v. Supervisor of the Jewish Settlements in Judea and Samaria, summarized by Elyakim Rubinstein, (Note: Rubinstein noted that: "The 'enclaves' are a sort of 'islands' to which Israeli laws were applied by legal means, under the assumption that there is no real difference between the law applying in Israel and the one that should apply in these enclaves... The matter at hand concerns Israeli citizens, and the assumption is that the gist of their lives should be as close as possible to that of the rest of Israeli citizens.") and a 2007 Supreme Court case, Kav LaOved v. Jerusalem Labor Court, summarized by Eliezer Rivlin. (Note: Rivlin noted that: “The Israeli residents living in the West Bank are subject to extensive parts of Israeli law, in addition to special legislation by the military commander that applies solely to the Israeli residents. The Palestinian residents living in the very same territories are subject to Jordanian law and to legislation by the military governor that applies to them [...] This outcome creates a regime in which different sets of laws apply in one territory.” Rivlin went on to describe the "enclave law" as follows: “The law is different regarding Israeli residents in the occupied territories. For them, there is a separate legislative layer, known as the "Enclave Law", which includes internal Israeli legislation that has been applied personally to Israeli citizens or to persons entitled to be Israeli citizens and living in the territories only.”)

== Implementation in practice ==
Territorial aspects of "enclave law" are implemented via a method called "pipelining". Under this method, Israeli Military Orders, which constitute the primary laws in the West Bank, apply Israeli laws specifically to the jurisdictions of the Israeli settlement local councils. This method is used to give Israeli ministries, such as the Israeli Ministry of Education and Israeli Health Ministry, jurisdiction over public facilities such as schools and hospitals in the territories.

== Dual legal system ==
Through this system, Israeli settlers are subject to large portions of Israeli law whereas Palestinians are subject to a combination of Israeli military law and some local laws based on Jordanian law. In 1989, Eyal Benvenisti described how "through extensive military legislation, exterritorial application of Israeli legislation and Israeli court rulings" the border between Israel and the West Bank was no longer relevant for "almost all legal purposes that reflect Israeli interests", but the same was not true for the Palestinian population, especially with respect to civil rights.

Israeli laws that are applicable to Israeli citizens living in the West Bank are often administrative in nature, and include taxation, product supervision, national insurance, education, welfare, health, work, personal status, but exclude laws relating directly to the territory itself such as land and planning laws. The Supreme Court of Israel has ruled that labour laws applied in this way also apply to those Palestinian workers in Israeli settlements due to the "significant linkages" test and the principle of equality within the settlements.

== Recent developments ==
In November 2014, a bill to require all new Israeli laws to consider their application to Israeli settlements was approved by the cabinet but opposed by Attorney General Yehuda Weinstein. In May 2016, the initiative was relaunched by Ayelet Shaked.

In December 2017, over 1,000 central committee members of Likud voted unanimously for "free construction and application of Israeli law and sovereignty in all liberated areas of settlement in Judea and Samaria".

In January 2018, the Knesset House Committee agreed to instruct legal advisors to discuss every new Knesset bill's application to West Bank settlements during the legislative process. This was followed, a few weeks later, by the first ever Knesset deliberation of the application of proposed laws to the West Bank settlements.

== See also ==
- International law and Israeli settlements
- Extraterritoriality
- Regulation Law
