= Elections in Israel =

Elections in Israel are based on nationwide proportional representation. The electoral threshold is currently set at 3.25%, with the number of seats a party receives in the Knesset being proportional to the number of votes it receives. The Knesset is elected for a four-year term, although most governments have not served a full term and snap elections are a frequent occurrence. Israel has a multi-party system based on coalition governments as no party has ever won a majority of seats in a national election, although the Alignment briefly held a majority following its formation by an alliance of several different parties prior to the 1969 elections. Suffrage is universal for all Israeli citizens above the age of 18. Israeli citizens living abroad have to travel to Israel in order to vote, but Israeli citizens living within the Israeli-occupied territories may vote from within those territories. Voting booths are made available on Israeli ships. Elections are overseen by the Central Elections Committee, and are held according to the Knesset Elections Law. Israel was ranked 53rd most electoral democratic country in the world according to V-Dem Democracy indices in 2026, having been downgraded from "liberal democracy" to "electoral democracy" in 2024. Municipal elections normally take place every five years, though the 2024 elections – originally scheduled for October 2023 – were postponed due to the onset of the Gaza war.

== Electoral procedure ==
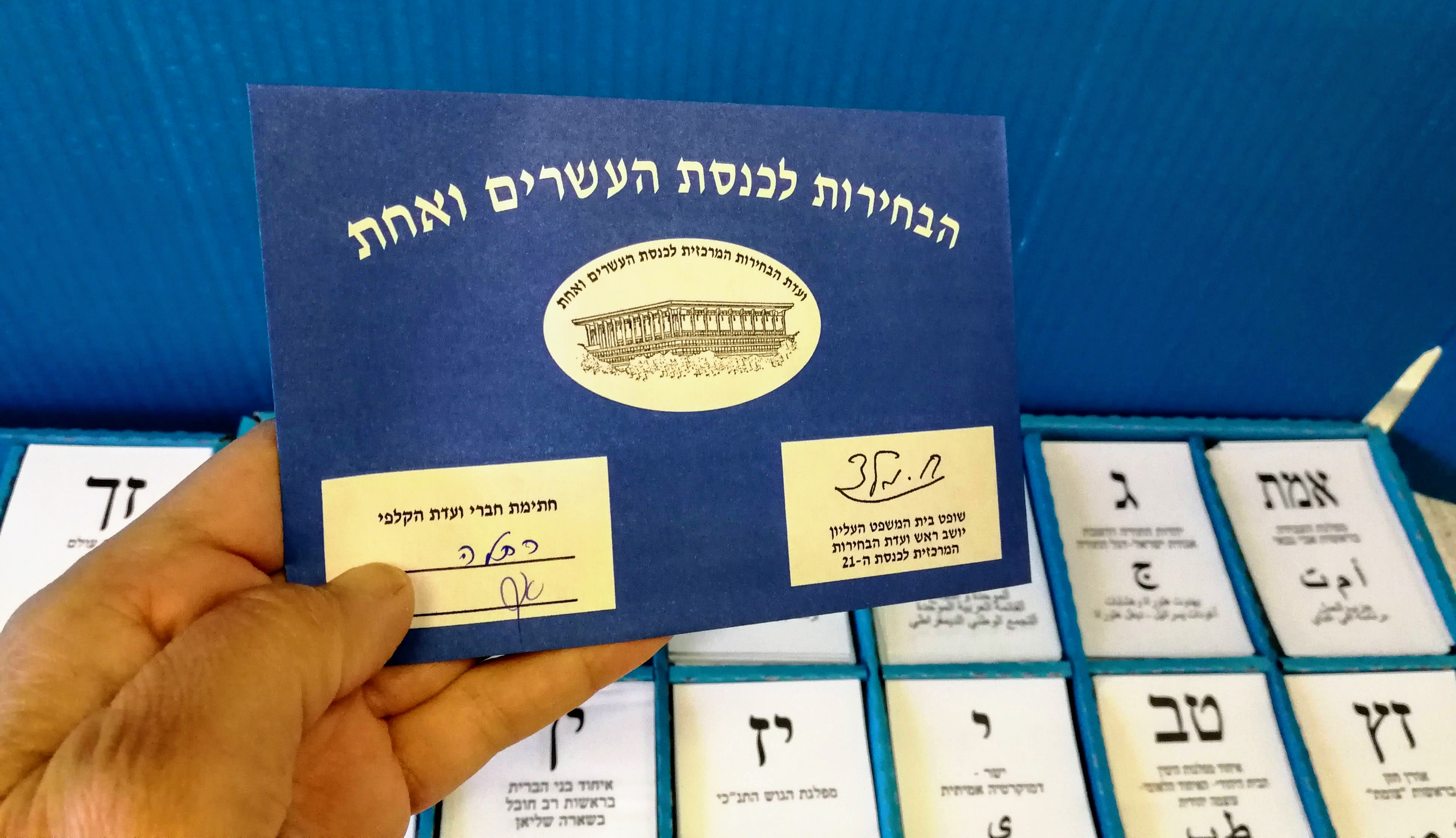
Ballot envelope, 2019

Under normal circumstances, Israel's Basic Law requires national elections for the Knesset to take place on a Tuesday in the Jewish month of Cheshvan (early October through mid-November) four years following the previous elections. However, it is possible, and it often happens, that early elections can take place prior to the date set in the basic law. Early elections can be called by a vote of the majority of Knesset members and normally occur on occasions of political stalemate and of the inability of the government to get the parliament's support for its policies. Failure to get the annual budget bill approved by the Knesset by 31 March (3 months after the start of the fiscal year) also leads automatically to early elections. It is also possible to postpone the date of the election by a special majority of the Knesset members.

Israel uses the closed-list method of party-list proportional representation; thus citizens vote for their preferred party and not for any individual candidates. The 120 seats in the Knesset are then assigned proportionally to each party, provided that the party vote count met the 3.25% electoral threshold. The D'Hondt method is used for marginal votes, slightly favouring the bigger parties. Parties may form electoral alliances and run as a single unified party so as to gain enough collective votes to meet the threshold (if so, the alliance as a whole must meet the threshold, not the individual parties) and thus be allocated seats. The relatively low threshold makes representation of minor parties more likely under the Israeli electoral system than many comparable systems used in other countries. Two parties can make an agreement so that both parties' sum of surplus votes are combined, and if the combined surplus votes amount to an extra seat, the extra seat goes to the party with the greater number of surplus votes.

Voting begins 12 days before election day for the general public in Israeli diplomatic missions worldwide for Israelis serving abroad in an official capacity and their families, and for Israeli sailors on Israeli ships at sea. Polling stations for serving soldiers open 72 hours before election day and soldiers may cast their votes from then up to the end of the election. Election day is a legally mandated national holiday. Most public polling stations are open between 7:00 AM and 10:00 PM, though if voters are still in line at 10:00 PM, the station will remain open until everyone has voted. Polling stations in small communities with fewer than 350 residents, hospitals, and prisons are open between 8:00 AM and 8:00 PM. Patients and staff in hospitals not able to vote during election hours are entitled to special permits allowing them to vote after polling stations in hospitals are closed to everyone else.

Every resident eligible to vote is assigned to a particular polling station close to their registered address, which maintains a list of all voters eligible to vote at that station. At the polling station, officials check the identification of voters to ensure that they are assigned to that particular station, check off their names in the list of voters for that station, and hand the voter an envelope. The voter selects the ballot slip of their party of choice behind a divider, places the slip into the envelope, then emerges from behind the partition to place it in the ballot box. Special polling stations are set up in hospitals, prisons, diplomatic missions abroad, military bases, women's shelters, and Israeli ships to enable medical professionals, patients, diplomats and their families, Jewish Agency staff abroad, soldiers, prison inmates and staff, sailors, and residents of women's shelters to vote. Polling stations with accessibility for the handicapped are set up around the country and police officers on duty may vote at any polling station. However, to ensure that nobody votes twice, as they are still assigned to a particular polling station close to their registered place of residence, they must vote with what are referred to as double envelopes. The envelope containing their ballot slip is placed into a larger envelope which also contains their identifying information so that it can be checked against the list of voters at their assigned polling station to see if they were marked as having voted there before their double envelope vote is counted. Aside from double envelope voters, all citizens may vote only at their registered polling place.

Once a regular polling station closes, officials at the polling station count the votes and send a document recording the results and the ballot box with the ballot slips inside it to one of 25 vote counting centers nationwide, where the documents are checked for any irregularities, then entered into the Central Elections Committee's software system, a closed system not connected to the Internet, and rechecked. Any irregularities detected by the software are brought to the attention of a district court judge present at the station throughout the vote counting process, who adjudicates all such cases. The results are published by the Central Elections Committee. The double envelope votes are brought to the Knesset and counted after all other votes have been counted. One team checks the identification details in the outer envelope against the list of voters at the person's assigned polling station to see if their name has been crossed out, which would mean that they had voted twice. The envelopes containing the ballot slips are then passed on to another team that opens them and counts the votes, thus preserving the anonymity of the votes.

Any Israeli citizen over 21 may be elected to the Knesset, except holders of several high positions in the civil service and officers or career soldiers (those should resign from their post before the elections), soldiers in compulsory service, and felons who were convicted and sentenced to prison terms exceeding three months (until seven years after their prison term expired).

The following people may not serve as a Member of Knesset (MK) due to their conflicting functions:

1. The President of the State of Israel
2. The two Chief Rabbis of the State of Israel
3. Any judge in the judicial system, so long as they still hold office
4. Any dayan, or judge in the Rabbinical Court system, so long as they still hold office
5. The State Comptroller
6. Rabbis or Ministers of religions, while receiving salaries for such a position
7. Senior state employees and senior army officers of such grades or ranks and in such functions as shall be determined by law

The following prevents a party from running a list in Knesset elections:

1. Negating the State of Israel as the state of the Jewish people
2. Negating the democratic nature of the State
3. Incitement to racism
4. Support of armed struggle against the State of Israel

After an election, the President, following consultations with the elected party leaders, chooses the Knesset member most likely to have the ability to form a viable (coalition) government. While this typically is the leader of the party receiving the most seats, it is not required to be so. In the event a party wins 61 or more seats in an election, it can form a viable government without having to form a coalition. However, no party has ever won more than 56 seats in an election; thus, a coalition has always been required. That member has up to 42 days to negotiate with the different parties, and then present his or her government to the Knesset for a vote of confidence. If the Knesset approves the proposed government (by a vote of at least 61 members), he or she becomes Prime Minister.

As the coalitions often prove highly unstable - given the number and diverse views of the political parties involved - parties (or portions thereof) quite commonly leave them. However, so long as the coalition has at least 61 members (and it is free to recruit from parties not originally in the coalition) it is entitled to remain in power. Such a case occurred with the 19th Knesset: Ehud Barak and four other members left the Labor Party in 2011 to form the Independence Party, and continued their alignment with Likud, while the remaining eight Labor members remained with the party, but left the coalition; after all the changes, the Likud coalition retained the support of the minimum 61 members, and so, it remained in power. If a coalition fails a motion of no confidence, it ceases to be in power, unless the motion names a specific replacement to be the prime minister. That individual then has a prescribed amount of time to form a new coalition, and new elections are called if this attempt is not successful (known as a constructive vote of no confidence).

== Finance ==
Israel has three sources of funding political campaigns: state funding (which makes up the majority), public donations and registration fees and other sources.

A single funding unit, which is calculated using a formula, is equivalent to 1.83 million NIS, as of September 2026.

Parties which hold Knesset seats are allocated higher amounts than a new party that has won a Knesset seat. If a party at a minimum reaches one per cent of the vote, but does not reach the electoral threshold, it is given one funding unit.

On the other hand, if a party competes in an election, but wins less than one per cent of the vote, it is allocated no funding units.

== History ==
The electoral threshold for a party to be allocated a Knesset seat was only 1% until 1988; it was then raised to 1.5% and remained at that level until 2003, when it was again raised to 2%. On 11 March 2014, the Knesset approved a new law to raise the threshold to 3.25% (approximately 4 seats).

In 1992, in an attempt to produce more stable governments, Israel adopted a system of direct election of the prime minister. The prime minister was directly elected separately from the Knesset in 1996, 1999 and 2001. The direct election of the prime minister was abandoned after the 2001 election, having failed to produce more stable governments.

== Voting method ==
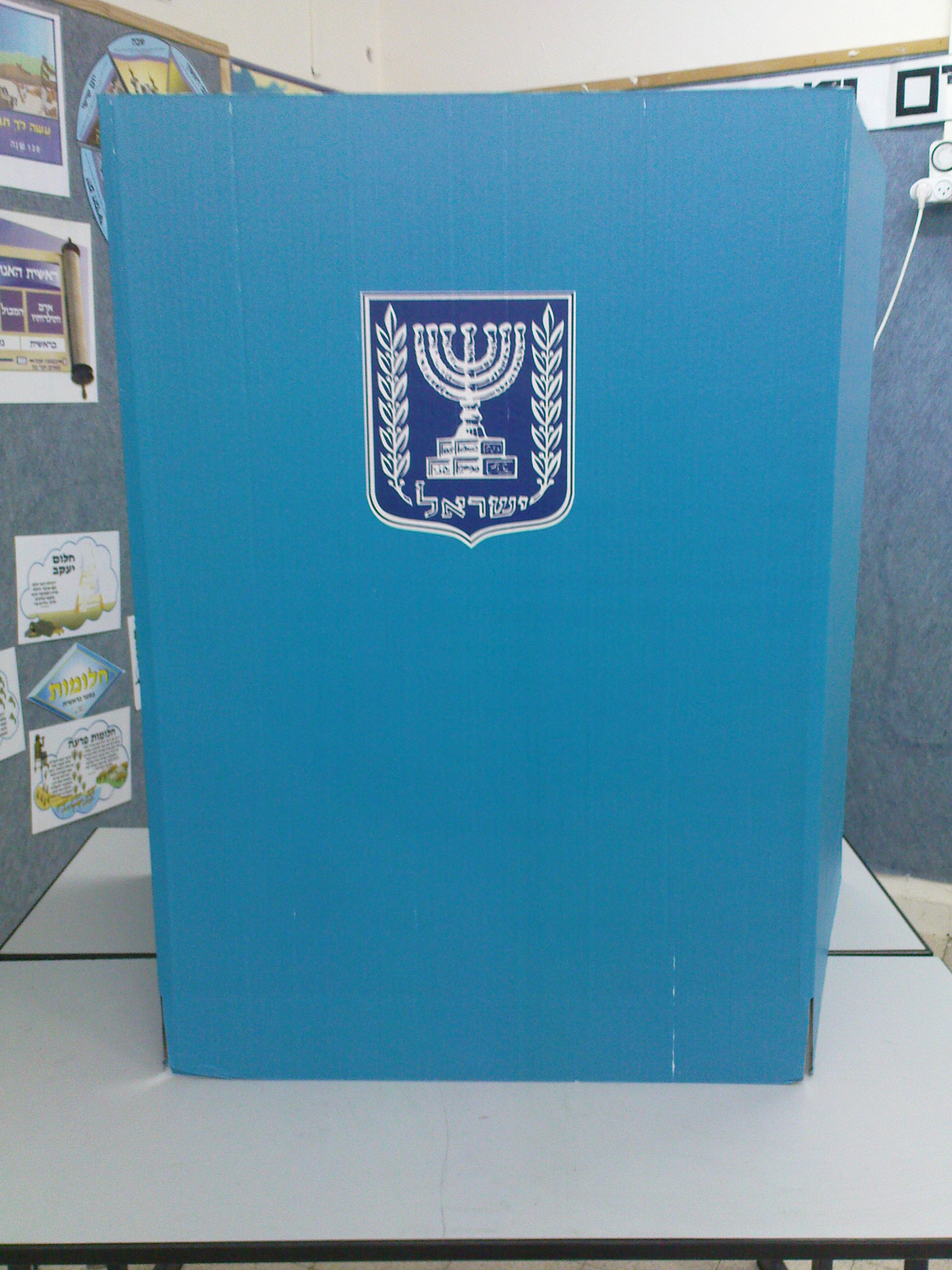
Ballot box

Israel's voting method is simplified by the fact that voters vote for a political party and not specific candidates in a closed list system.

On election day, and upon entry to a polling station, the voter is given an official envelope, and shown to a voting booth.

Inside the booth is a tray of slips, one for each party. The slips are printed with the "ballot letters" of the party (between one and three Hebrew or Arabic letters), and the full official name of the party in small print. Each party publicizes their letters prior to election day, with most election posters featuring them. As many political parties in Israel are known by their acronyms, several parties can spell out their name in two or three letters, and thus use their name as their ballot letters (e. g., Meretz and Hetz).

Alongside the printed slips, polling stations also provide blank white slips as a backup in case a party's ballots run out due to a supply problem or deliberate removal. Under section 76(c) of the Knesset Elections law, a voter may use a blank slip only by writing the party's identifying letters, with or without the party's full name, in blue ink.

The voter chooses the relevant slip for their party, puts it in the envelope, seals it, and then places the envelope into the ballot box. The system is simple to use for those with limited literacy. This is especially important in Israel where many new immigrants struggle with the language. Each party must register its chosen letters with the Israeli Central Elections Committee, and certain letters are reserved. If a new party wishes to use letters from an older party, it must receive permission from that party. Example of reserved letters are מ ח ל for Likud and ש ס for Shas.

Voting is by paper ballot and votes are counted manually before being entered into a computer system which is not connected to the Internet. Israel does not employ electronic voting due to fears that elections could be vulnerable to cyber threats from those trying to influence the results.

== Legislative elections ==
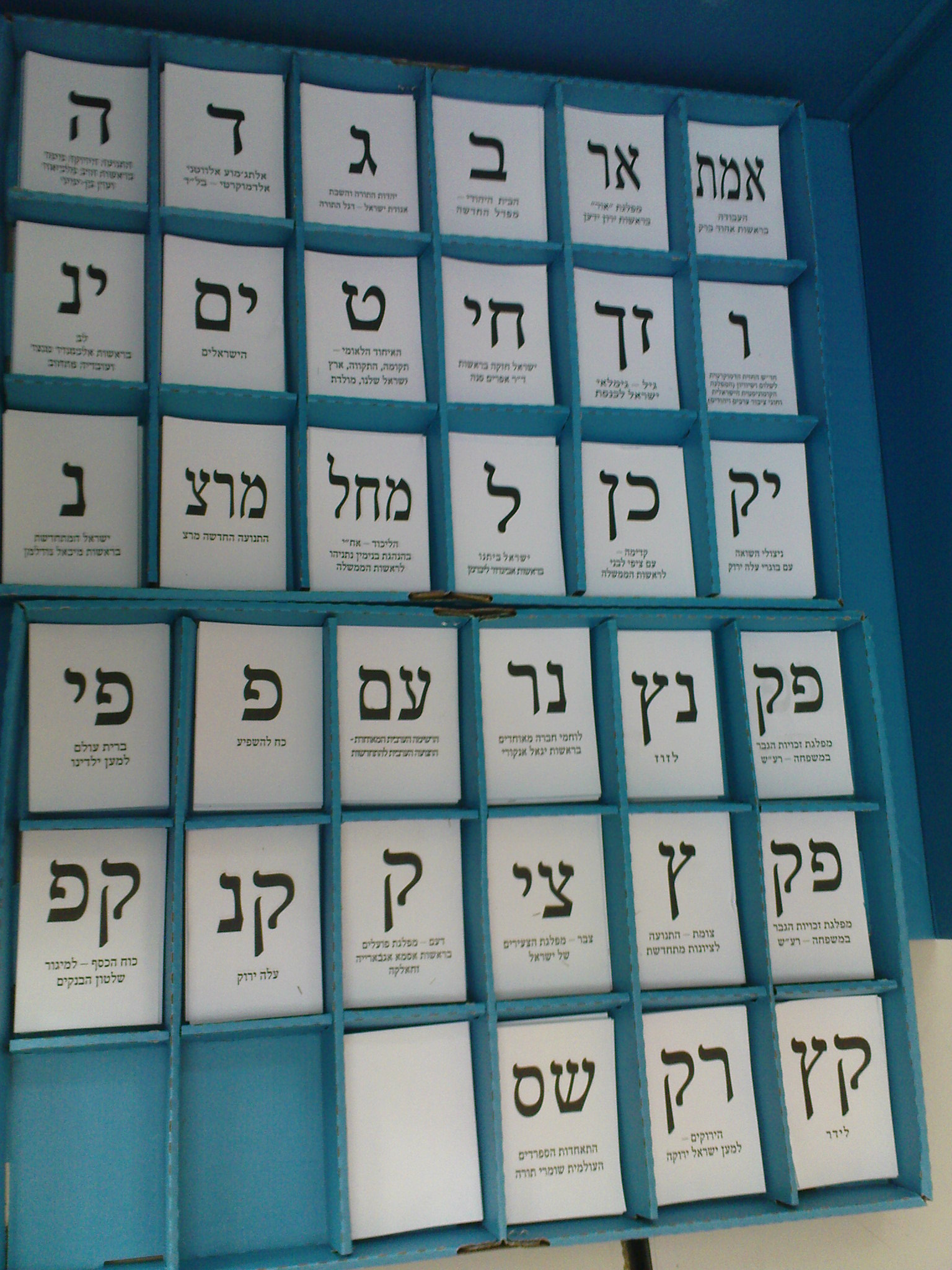
Ballot slips used in Israeli elections

Election	Knesset	Valid votes	Invalid votes	Total votes	Registered voters	Turnout
1949	1	434,684	5,411	440,095	506,567	86.9%
1951	2	687,492	7,515	695,007	924,885	75.2%
1955	3	853,219	22,969	876,188	1,057,609	82.8%
1959	4	969,339	24,967	994,306	1,218,724	81.6%
1961	5	1,006,964	30,066	1,037,030	1,274,280	81.4%
1965	6	1,206,728	37,978	1,244,706	1,499,988	83.0%
1969	7	1,367,743	60,238	1,427,981	1,758,685	81.2%
1973	8	1,566,855	34,243	1,601,098	2,037,478	78.6%
1977	9	1,747,870	23,906	1,771,776	2,236,293	79.2%
1981	10	1,920,123	17,243	1,937,366	2,490,014	77.8%
1984	11	2,073,321	18,081	2,091,402	2,654,613	78.8%
1988	12	2,283,123	22,444	2,305,567	2,894,267	79.7%
1992	13	2,616,841	21,102	2,637,943	3,409,015	77.4%
1996	14	3,052,130	67,702	3,119,832	3,933,250	79.3%
1999	15	3,309,416	64,332	3,373,748	4,285,428	78.7%
2003	16	3,148,364	52,409	3,200,773	4,720,075	67.8%
2006	17	3,137,064	49,675	3,186,739	5,014,622	63.5%
2009	18	3,373,490	43,097	3,416,587	5,278,985	64.7%
2013	19	3,792,742	40,904	3,833,646	5,656,705	67.8%
2015	20	4,209,467	43,869	4,253,336	5,881,696	72.4%
2019 (April)	21	4,309,270	30,983	4,340,253	6,339,279	68.5%
2019 (September)	22	4,436,806	28,362	4,465,168	6,394,030	69.8%
2020	23	4,586,954	25,053	4,612,007	6,453,255	71.5%
2021	24	4,410,052	26,313	4,436,365	6,578,084	67.4%
2022	25	4,763,964	29,947	4,793,641	6,788,804	70.6%
2026	26	5,691,426	25,971 (Note: Includes all blank votes)	5,717,397	7,331,981	77.98%
