= Elyakim Rubinstein =

Israeli Supreme Court judge

- אליקים רובינשטיין
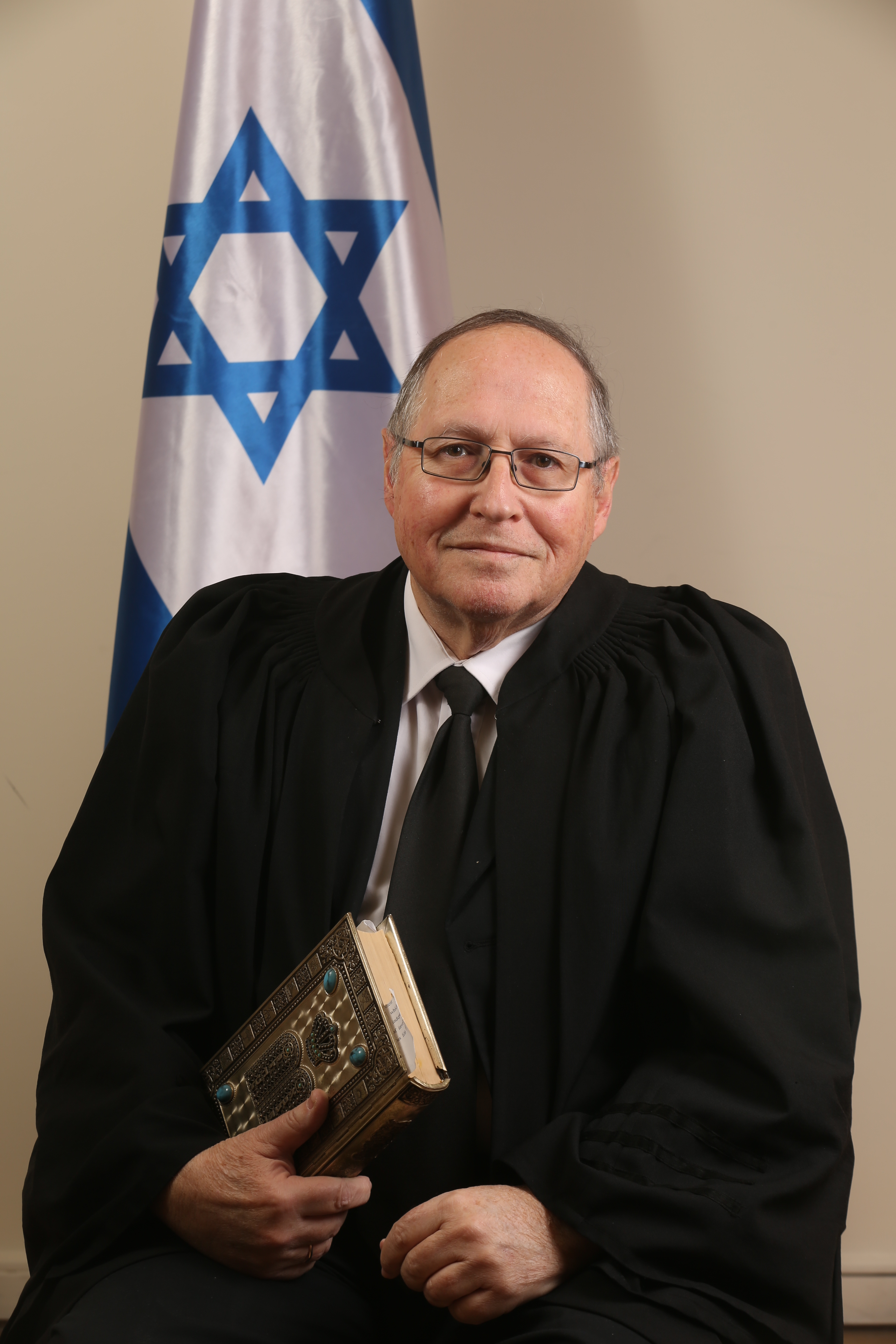

Legal adviser for the Ministry of Foreign Affairs
- In office 1981–1985
- Preceded by: Ruth Lapidoth
- Succeeded by: Robbie Sabel

Attorney General of Israel
- In office 1997–2004
- Preceded by: Roni Bar-On
- Succeeded by: Menachem Mazuz

Vice President of the Supreme Court of Israel
- In office 2015–2017
- Preceded by: Miriam Naor
- Succeeded by: Salim Joubran

Personal details
- Born: 12 June 1947 (age 79) Tel Aviv, Mandatory Palestine
- Education: Hebrew University of Jerusalem
- Occupation: Jurist
- Known for: Shaping Israel's peace treaties with Egypt and Jordan, advocating for religious pluralism

Elyakim Rubinstein (Hebrew: אליקים רובינשטיין; born June 13, 1947) is a former Vice President of the Supreme Court of Israel. Beforehand, he served as the Attorney General of Israel from 1997 to 2004. Rubinstein, a former Israeli diplomat and long-time civil servant, has had an influential role in that country's internal and external affairs, most notably in helping to shape its peace treaties with Egypt and Jordan.

== Early life ==
Born in Tel Aviv and raised in Givatayim, he graduated from Zeitlin, a religious high school in Tel Aviv, and earned his bachelor's (1969) and master's (1974) degrees from Hebrew University of Jerusalem.

== Career ==
Rubinstein launched a career in law, serving as a legal advisor to the ministries of Defense and Foreign Affairs during the mid-1970s. His diplomatic career started in 1977, and from then through 1979 he was a member of Israel's delegation to the peace talks with Egypt that led to the signing of the Camp David Accords between the two countries. Upon their completion, he became in 1980 an assistant director-general of the Ministry of Foreign Affairs in charge of implementing the normalization of relations with Egypt.

During the early 1980s he served in a variety of capacities in the Ministry of Foreign Affairs. In 1981-1985 served as Legal adviser for the Israeli Ministry of Foreign Affairs, and in 1985-1986 served as Deputy Chief of Mission of the Embassy of Israel in Washington, D.C. In 1986 he was appointed Cabinet Secretary and in this capacity he served in various roles relating to Israel–United States relations.

In 1991 he was again a member of an Israeli peace negotiating team, traveling as part of the Israeli delegation to the Madrid Peace Conference that opened the negotiations (for which he served as chairman of the Israeli delegation) that would eventually lead to the 1993 Oslo Accords, a major breakthrough in the Israeli–Palestinian conflict.

Following the conclusion of these talks, he chaired the Israeli delegation to peace talks with Jordan, which concluded successfully with the 1994 Israel–Jordan peace treaty.

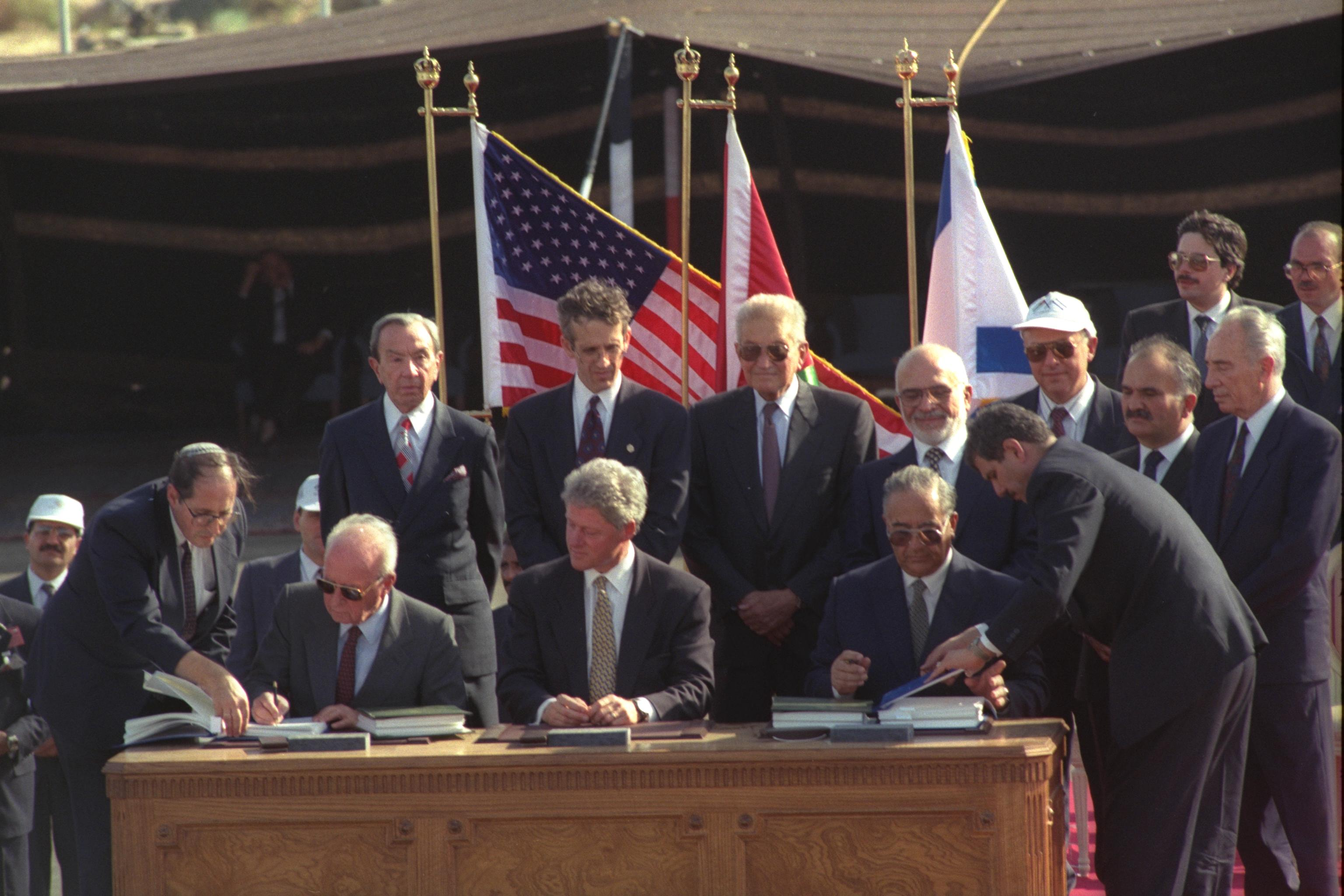
Rubinstein (far left) at the signing of the Israel-Jordan peace treaty

He then turned towards domestic Israeli jurisprudence, serving as a judge on Jerusalem's District Court from 1995 to 1997, and then as Attorney General of Israel, a position he held until January 25, 2004. He has written several books on Israel's Supreme Court, especially focusing on the relation of Judaism to Israeli political and legal life. In this role he has gained a reputation for being somewhat of a liberal reformer, going up against the established might of Orthodox Judaism in favor of religious pluralism to represent all factions of Judaism. His most important success in this endeavor has been to gain Reform and Conservative Judaism seats on Jerusalem's religious council, previously controlled entirely by the Orthodox. He has proposed opening a section of the Western Wall for non-Orthodox religious services, but this has not yet been successful.

Rubinstein has been criticized for being too hesitant or indecisive in cases involving powerful Israeli officials. In particular, he was criticized for having moved too slowly on corruption charges involving Prime Minister Ariel Sharon and his son Gilad. In the weeks following Rubinstein's end of term as Attorney General The State Attorney, Edna Arbel, was quick to recommend that Sharon be indicted on bribery charges, however Rubinstein's replacement Menachem Mazuz subsequently exonerated Sharon and his sons and did not press charges of corruption due to insufficient evidence.

In May 2004, Rubinstein was appointed to Israel's Supreme Court. In January 2015 he was appointed Vice President of the Court, a position he held until his statutory retirement at the age of 70, in 2017.

== Controversies ==
=== As Attorney General ===
Rubinstein gained a reputation for being somewhat of a liberal reformer, going up against the established might of Orthodox Judaism in favor of religious pluralism to represent all factions of Judaism. His most important success in this endeavor came when Reform and Conservative Judaism gained seats on Jerusalem's religious council, previously controlled entirely by the Orthodox. He has proposed opening a section of the Western Wall for non-Orthodox religious services, but this has not yet been implemented.

In 1999, Rubinstein decided not to investigate former Sephardi Chief Rabbi Ovadia Yosef, the founder and spiritual leader of the ultra-Orthodox Shas party, for calling Supreme Court justices "evildoers", "empty-headed and reckless" and various other harsh epithets. A year later, however, he did order an investigation after Rabbi Yosef compared the secular education minister, Yossi Sarid, to the Pharaoh of the Book of Exodus and said he should be "extirpated from the Earth" like Haman in the Book of Esther.

In January 2000, Rubinstein asked President Ezer Weizman to hand over financial documents after it was disclosed in the press that he failed to report $450,000 he received as a "gift" from a friend to the Knesset and tax authorities. Weizman ultimately resigned six months later.

Despite this, Rubinstein was often criticized for being too hesitant or indecisive in cases involving powerful Israeli officials, in particular for moving too slowly on those corruption charges involving Prime Minister Ariel Sharon and his son Gilad. In the weeks following the end of his term as Attorney General, the State Attorney, Edna Arbel, was quick to recommend that Sharon be indicted on bribery charges. Rubinstein's initial hesitancy, however, was subsequently vindicated by his replacement, Menachem Mazuz, who decided not to press charges of corruption against Sharon and his son due to insufficient evidence.

In the midst of the Sharon investigation Rubinstein suspended a state prosecutor for leaking to a Haaretz reporter a document that outlined corruption allegations against Sharon and his son while the matter was sub judice.

I am not a disciple of investigations into leaks, mainly because in the past they have not shown results. Two reasons led me to decide upon the investigation: ... the obstruction and damage caused to the investigation by the leak, and the suspicion, which unfortunately came true, that a source from the government made a political move in this sensitive period prior to the elections.

— Elyakim Rubinstein, Los Angeles Times

During the 2003 legislative election campaign, Attorney General Rubinstein supported the Central Election Committee's decision to ban the anti-Zionist Balad party and its leader, Azmi Bishara, as well as Baruch Marzel of the right-wing Yamin Yisrael party from running, but he objected to its decision to disqualify Ahmad Tibi on account of his public support for Yasser Arafat, which it viewed as tacit support for terrorism. The Committee based its opinion on Article 7 of the Basic Law on the Knesset, which states that candidates for Knesset cannot oppose the Jewish and democratic character of the state, preach racism or support armed attacks by an enemy state or terrorist organization. Rubinstein even submitted to the Court information gathered by the Shin Bet to support the ban on Bishara (who subsequently fled the country before he was charged with treason and espionage for advising Hezbollah during the 2006 Lebanon War and stealing millions of shekels from Arab aid organizations). Balad, Bishara, and Marzel, however, were ultimately allowed to participate in the elections when the decisions against them were overturned by the Supreme Court.

=== On the Supreme Court ===
In 2012, Rubinstein, who is regarded by many as a "relative conservative" on the Court, openly supported the right of his Arab-Christian colleague, Justice Salim Joubran, not to sing the national anthem, Hatikvah, at an official ceremony:

Non-Jewish citizens must respect the anthem by standing for it… but one cannot demand that Arab citizens sing words that do not speak to their hearts and do not reflect their roots… Of course whoever wants to join in the singing of the anthem is welcome to do so, but the decision is personal.

— Elyakim Rubinstein, The Times of Israel

In his capacity as chairman of the 2013 Knesset election committee, Rubinstein forced the removal of several television ads, one from Shas, which he viewed as insulting to Russian-speaking immigrants, and the others from Otzma LeYisrael, which he viewed as racist against Arabs.

== Landmark rulings ==
- CA 4243/08 Assessment Officer - Dan Region v. Vered Peri of April 30, 2009: Rubinstein joined four colleagues in a landmark decision that upheld a Tel Aviv District Court decision allowing working parents to deduct childcare expenses from their taxes. In his concurring opinion, he quoted a commentary by Menachem Mendel Schneerson, the Lubavitcher rebbe, on the obligation of charity in Halakha, or Jewish religious law, to apply a parallel obligation in Israeli civil law, and concluded:

The emerging picture is that Halakha regards necessary expenses, including expenses for a caregiver, as appropriate for deduction from the basis of tithes (ma’aser kesafim), and the analogy to our case is clear.

— Elyakim Rubinstein, Assessment Officer - Dan Region v. Vered Peri

- HCJ 746/07 Ragen v. Ministry of Transport of January 5, 2011: Speaking for the High Court of Justice, Rubinstein ruled that public buses could not bow to pressure from Haredim (ultra-Orthodox) Jews and segregate passengers by gender without their consent, citing the American civil rights movement as his precedent:

A public transportation operator, like any other person, does not have the right to order, request or tell women where they may sit simply because they are women. They must sit wherever they like. As I now read over these lines emphasizing this I am astounded that there was even a need to write them in the year 2010. Have the days of Rosa Parks, the African-American woman who collapsed the racist segregation on an Alabama bus in 1955, returned?

— Elyakim Rubinstein, Haaretz

- HCJ 6298/07 Ressler v Knesset of February 21, 2012: Rubinstein sided with the High Court's majority declaring the so-called Tal Law unconstitutional. The law provided special exemption from mandatory military service in the Israel Defense Forces (IDF) to ultra-Orthodox Jews and extended mandatory military service to Israeli-Arabs. Rubinstein, who is religious, included numerous texts from traditional Jewish texts in his written ruling. This prompted former Chief Rabbi Yosef to label the High Court "a court of gentiles," call Rubinstein and his colleagues "wicked" and declare that they should not be allowed to lead synagogue prayers.

Nevertheless, we need to admit the truth, [that] unlike in Jewish-Haredi society in other countries, which has understood that only a few brilliant individuals can live under the tent of Torah all their lives, in Israel a whole complicated sociological system has been built that even its leaders know, deep in their hearts, is not good and not appropriate, that because of military duty thousands of people sit in the yeshivot, where it is not their place... These people, if they served in IDF, and if they worked like any other person while also making time for Torah... would be efficient both to the state, to their community and to themselves.

— Elyakim Rubinstein, Resler v. Knesset

While sitting on the High Court, Rubinstein ruled in favor of evicting residents of two of the 46 unrecognized Bedouin villages inside Israel that were established illegally, without official administrative or planning approval.

- HCJ 3094/11 Ibrahim Farhood Abu al-Qi’an et al v. the State of Israel of May 5, 2015: In ruling on the case of Umm al-Hiran, Rubinstein wrote:

The state is the owner of the lands in dispute, which were registered in its name in the framework of the arrangement process; the residents have acquired no rights to the land but have settled them [without any authorization], which the state cancelled legally. In such a situation, there is no justification for intervention in the rulings of the previous courts.

— Elyakim Rubinstein, i24news

- CA 3094/11 Al-Qi'an v. the State of Israel of May 5, 2015: In a case involving Al-Araqeeb, the court stated that the 2007 United Nations General Assembly’s Declaration on the Rights of Indigenous Peoples and a pro-indigenous peoples’ rights 1992 Australia court ruling were not binding and did not reflect codified customary international law. In his decision, Rubinstein, together with Justice Neal Hendel, approved the removal of the village, stating:

This is not expulsion and not expropriation, but the proposed evacuation involves various proposals of moving, construction, compensation and the possibility of homes, whether in the town of Hura where most of the residents of the illegal villages involved will be moved, or in the community of Hiran, which is to be built.

— Elyakim Rubinstein and Neal Hendel, The Jerusalem Post

- AAA 5875/10 The Conservative Movement and the Movement for Progressive Judaism in Israel v. Be'er Sheva Religious Council and the Ministry of Religious Services of February 11, 2016: In this landmark decision, Rubinstein ruled that all of Israel’s public ritual baths (mikva'ot) must allow access to groups wishing to perform non-Orthodox conversions. A month later, he joined with the majority in another landmark ruling that held that immigrants who converted to Judaism through independent conversion courts outside the auspices of the Chief Rabbinate of Israel must be recognized as Jews under the country's Law of Return.
- HCJ 4374/15 The Movement for Quality Government v. The Prime Minister of Israel of March 27, 2016: Rubinstein wrote the High Court's decision invalidating Israel's natural gas plan, siding with the appellants, which included the Movement for Quality Government in Israel, the Israel Union for Environmental Defense, and the Israel Labor Party and Meretz. The ruling was criticized by Prime Minister Benjamin Netanyahu, who said in response that "the court's decision seriously threatens the development of gas reserves of the State of Israel. Israel is seen as a state in which excessive judicial intervention makes it difficult to do business with." Rubinstein wrote:

The stability clause in this chapter of the plan, in which the government undertakes for a decade to not only not legislate but to also fight any legislation against the plan’s provisions, was determined without authority – and as such is rejected. It was determined in contrast to the general principle of administrative law regarding the prohibition of shackling the authority’s ability to judge. The government does not have the power to decide not to decide and not to act.

— Elyakim Rubinstein, Yedioth Ahronoth

- HCJ 5304/15 Israel Medical Association v. Israel Knesset of September 11, 2016: Rubinstein, joined by other justices on the High Court, denied petitions on behalf of Palestinian hunger strikers imprisoned on terrorism-related charges, challenging an amendment to the law that permits their force-feeding by physicians. Declaring the amendment constitutional, Rubinstein, writing for the Court, declared that a hunger striker "is not an ordinary patient but a person who knowingly and willingly places himself in a dangerous situation as a protest or a means of attaining a personal or public goal." He also noted that laws in France, the United States, Australia, Germany, and Austria enable forced artificial feeding under exceptional cases that vary from country to country. Moreover, he argued, relevant decisions of the European Court of Human Rights do not completely prohibit forced feeding. Although security considerations by themselves do not justify the use of forced treatment, Rubinstein stated, such considerations may be weighed when a treating physician has already determined that the prisoner’s medical status is grave and that there is a real danger to his or her life or that lack of treatment will expose the prisoner to an irreversible serious handicap.

Certain Israeli human rights organizations and the appellant, the Israel Medical Association (IMA), opposed the Court's decision. The IMA announced that it would instruct its members to ignore it. "This is a case in which medical ethics unequivocally trump the law, and the message we wish to convey to physicians is that forced feeding is tantamount to torture and that no doctor should take part in it," stated the association's president.

== Personal life ==
Rubinstein's wife, Miriam, is also an advocate, a former director of the Civil Division at the Office of the State Attorney and, like her husband, a former Jerusalem District Court judge. They had four daughters, one of whom, Sari, died from cancer on October 25, 2016 at the age of 39. A mother of two small daughters herself, Sari, like her parents, studied law and became a licensed advocate upon passing the bar examination, after which she was accepted as a cadet at the Ministry of Foreign Affairs. Elyakim and Miram Rubinstein have 11 grandchildren.

Legal offices
Preceded by Roni Bar-On	Attorney General of Israel; 1997–2004	Succeeded by Menachem Mazuz
Preceded by Miriam Naor	Chairman of the Central Elections Committee; 2012–2013	Succeeded by Salim Joubran
