= IICA =

IICA may refer to:

- Indian Institute of Corporate Affairs
- Inter-American Institute for Cooperation on Agriculture, see Organization of American States
- International Ice Swimming Association
- Iranian Institute of Certified Accountants
- Israeli Institute of Commercial Arbitration
