= Israeli Institute of Commercial Arbitration =

The Israeli Institute of Commercial Arbitration (IICA; Hebrew: המוסד לבוררות עסקית) was founded in 1991 by the Federation of Israeli Chambers of Commerce. The IICA is generally considered the leading arbitration institution in Israel.

== History ==
The late Prof. Smadar Ottolenghi was one of the founders of the IICA, and she served as its first President for nearly thirteen years. The current President of the IICA is the Honorable Judge (Retired) Ayala Procaccia. The prior President (through 2012) was Amnon Straschnov.

In addition to providing arbitration services, the IICA also provides mediation services.

The IICA’s list of arbitrators and mediators includes those from different backgrounds and disciplines: retired Israeli judges, lawyers, accountants, engineers, appraisers, and economists.

From 1991 until 2007, the IICA maintained only one set of arbitration rules, in Hebrew (the General Rules). In 2007, the IIICA adopted a special set of rules, in English, for international disputes (the International Rules).

The chairman of the IICA Rules Committee (which drafted the General Rules) is Advocate David Golan. The principal draftsman of the IICA's International Rules was Advocate Eric Sherby.

== Unique features of General (Domestic) Rules ==
Throughout the world, the lack of appealability is generally considered one of the drawbacks of arbitration. One of the unique aspects of the IICA's General Rules is that it addresses the concern as to appealability. In 2004, the IICA amended the General Rules to allow the parties to an arbitration to agree on an appellate level to review the award of the arbitrator(s). The appellate procedure does not have any effect on the parties' rights under Israeli law to file a motion to confirm an arbitral award (or a motion to cancel/vacate an arbitral award) under Israeli law.

The IICA is believed to be one of very few arbitral institutions globally that has adopted an institutional procedure for appealing arbitral awards.

== Unique features of International Rules ==
The IICA's International Rules are not like the UNCITRAL Rules. The IICA's International Rules provide that, whenever an arbitration agreement is in English, absent the parties' agreement otherwise, the language of the arbitration will be English. In such respect, the IICA is believed to be the only national arbitral institution (in a country where English is not an official language) to provide for English as the "default" language of arbitration.

The International Rules generally respect the parties' pre-dispute agreement to use multiple arbitrators, subject to the party's prompt notification of the desire for a multiple arbitrator adjudication.

The IICA's International Rules also provide that certain rulings concerning a claim of privilege that relies upon substantive law other than Israeli law may be appealed to the President of the IICA.
