= Ayala Procaccia =

Israeli Supreme Court justice

- אילה פרוקצ'יה
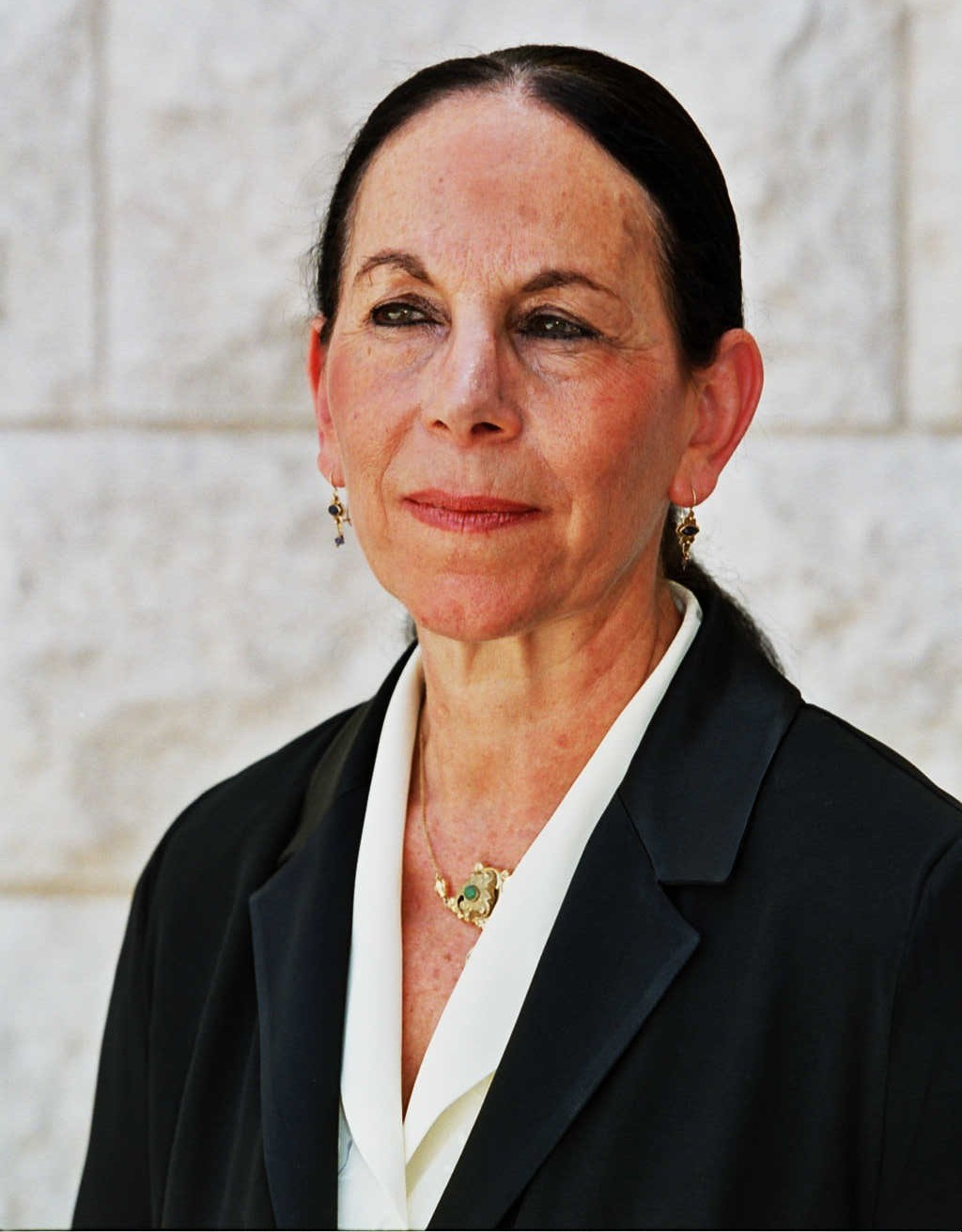
- Ayala Procaccia

Justice of the Supreme Court of Israel
- In office 2001–2011

Personal details
- Born: 1941 (age 84–85) Ashdot Ya'akov, Israel
- Education: Hebrew University of Jerusalem (LLB, MA); University of Pennsylvania (SJD)

Ayala Procaccia (Hebrew: אילה פרוקצ'יה; born 1941) is a retired Israeli Justice of the Supreme Court of Israel. Before being elected to the Supreme Court in 2001, she served as a judge in the Jerusalem Magistrates’ Court until 1993 and in the Jerusalem District Court from 1993 to 2001. While active in the Israeli law courts, Ayala Procaccia worked to change Israeli law to champion equality for all, regardless of gender or religion. Proponents of Procaccia say that she strives for an equitable and just society; critics of her work said that she promoted a judicial dictatorship over the government.

== Biography ==
Procaccia was born in Kibbutz Ashdot Ya'akov to a German father, Hanan Aynor, and a Polish mother, Yaffa Puterman-Efrat (Rodstein). She was an only child, and attended public schools in Tel Aviv.

Procaccia served in the Israel Defense Forces between 1959 and 1961. She graduated from the Hebrew University of Jerusalem with an LL.B. degree in 1963 (distinction) and a master's degree in 1969 (distinction). Following her graduation, she served as legal assistant to Chief Justice Shimon Agranat for four years. In 1969, she moved to the United States to pursue a Doctor of Juridical Science degree (S.J.D.) at the University of Pennsylvania Law School. Upon her graduation in 1972, she returned to Israel and became the legal assistant to the Attorney General. In 1983, she was appointed legal adviser to the Securities and Exchange Commission of Israel. She was appointed judiciary in 1987, and served in both the Jerusalem Magistrates' Court and in the Jerusalem District Court until 2001. She supported the right of children in East Jerusalem and said that children's right to free education in East Jerusalem is not being met

In 2001 she was elected to the Supreme Court of Israel where she served until her retirement in 2011. In 2005, she appeared at Boston University, Harvard Law School, and Brandeis University, to lecture the Boston area about Israel’s democracy and human rights. Following her retirement, she said she planned to remain active. In 2023, she demonstrated this by calling for and partaking in a protest against the override clause, where people were worried that the Knesset would have too much power, should the bill be passed.

Procaccia was married to Uriel Procaccia (whom she divorced in 1991) and has two children, Oren (b. 1971) and Yuval (b. 1974).

== Court rulings ==
Procaccia's first supreme court case was in 2002, regarding soldiers in the Israel Defense Forces, and exemption of service for specific individuals, wherein the supreme court ruled to deny the petition, subjecting the individuals to serving in the military reserve service.

A notable court case in 2003, regarding the film Jenin, Jenin led to a supreme court ruling that it should not be censored in theaters, and the public should be able to make judgements for themselves.

In 2008, in the case "Center for Jewish Pluralism v. Ministry of Education", Procaccia ruled that the education system does not need to fund religious educational establishments.

Additionally, In 2011, Procaccia and two other justices ruled against a longstanding several-billion-dollar lawsuit in Clalit Health Services against tobacco companies, saying that rather than sue the tobacco industry, they should sue on behalf of each individual who was harmed. These justices did not deny that these tobacco companies have had a negative effect on the health of members of Clalit Health Services.

Her final ruling as a supreme court justice struck down an Interior Ministry regulation that made foreign workers lose their work permit on the occurrence of childbirth or pregnancy.

This concluded her work as a supreme court justice, and she was dismissed in a formal ceremony with the other supreme court justices, family, and friends, leaving her supreme court seat to be filled. This supreme court seat would be filled by Noam Sohlberg. The compiled list of supreme court cases with Procaccia is shown below.

A list of all supreme court cases held with justice Ayala Procaccia
Date of verdict	Name of the Case	Supreme Court's Verdict
December 30, 2002	Zonstien v. Judge-Advocate General	Petition denied
January 9, 2003	Faiglin v. Cheshin	Petition denied
January 23, 2003	Association for Civil Rights in Israel v. Chairman of the Central Elections Committee for the Sixteenth Knesset	Petition granted
May 15, 2003	Mofaz v. Chairman of the Central Elections Committee for the Sixteenth Knesset	Appeal denied
November 11, 2003	Bakri v. Israel Film Council	Petition granted
March 3, 2004	SHIN, Israeli Movement for Equal Representation of Women v. Council for Cable TV and Satellite Broadcasting	Petitions denied
March 4, 2004	State of Israel v. Haggai Yosef	Appeal allowed
March 4, 2004	Hass v. IDF Commander in West Bank	Petitions denied
June 14, 2004	Solodkin v. Beit Shemesh Municipality	Petitions denied
July 14, 2004	A v. B	Appeal denied
August 9, 2004	Milo v. Minister of Defense	Petition denied
October 26, 2004	Fuchs v. Prime Minister	Petitions denied
November 22, 2004	Ganis v. Ministry of Building and Housing	Petition granted
March 31, 2005	State of Israel v. Peretz	Petition denied
April 4, 2005	Design 22 Shark Deluxe Furniture Ltd. v. Rosenzweig	Petition denied
May 31, 2005	Tais Rodriguez-Tushbeim v. Minister of Interior	Petition HCJ 2859/99 Granted, Petition HCJ 2597/99 dismissed
July 28, 2005	Najar v. State of Israel	Appeal denied
September 15, 2005	Mara’abe v. The Prime Minister of Israel	Petition granted
December 12, 2005	Commitment to Peace and Social Justice Society v. Minister of Finance	Petition denied
February 27, 2006	Supreme Monitoring Committee for Arab Affairs in Israel and others v. Prime Minister of Israel	Petition granted
April 6, 2006	Amir v. The Great Rabbinical Court in Jerusalem	Petition granted
May 4, 2006	Yissacharov v. Chief Military Prosecutor	Appeal allowed
May 14, 2006	Adalah Legal Center for Arab Minority Rights in Israel v. Minister of Interior	Petition denied
June 13, 2006	Dobrin v. Israel Prison Service	Petition denied
August 1, 2006	Beilin v. Prime Minister	Petition denied
October 8, 2006	State of Israel v. Beer-Sheba District Court	Petition granted
November 21, 2006	Ben-Ari v. Director of Population Administration	Petition granted
December 12, 2006	Rosenbaum v. Israel Prison Service Commissioner	Petitions granted
December 12, 2006	Adalah Legal Center for Arab Minority Rights in Israel v. Minister of Defense	Petition granted
February 6, 2007	Galon v. Government Commission of Investigation	Petition denied
September 4, 2007	Yassin v. Government of Israel	Petition granted
October 10, 2007	Kav LaOved v. National Labour Court	Petition granted
December 6, 2007	Emunah v. Prime Minister	Petition denied
June 11, 2008	A v. State of Israel	Appeal denied
July 27, 2008	Center for Jewish Pluralism v. Ministry of Education	Petition denied
August 20, 2008	Hamifkad Haleumi v. Attorney General	Petition denied
March 24, 2009	New Family v. Minister of Labor and Welfare	Petition granted in part
July 21, 2009	Boaron v. National Labour Court	Petitions denied
November 19, 2009	Academic Center of Law and Business v. Minister of Finance	Petition granted
February 11, 2010	A v. State of Israel	Appeal allowed
February 22, 2010	Daka v. Minister of the Interior	Petition granted
June 14, 2010	Yekutieli v. Minister of Religious Affairs	Petition granted
August 29, 2010	Carmel Haifa Hospital v. Malul (summary)	Appeal allowed
March 24, 2011	District Committee of the Tel Aviv District Bar Association v. Halberstadt	Appeal denied
April 28, 2011	Bar-Ilan University v. National Labor Court	Petition denied
July 7, 2011	Hotline for Migrant Workers v. Minister of Defense	Appeal denied
February 10, 2015	Zoabi v. Knesset's Ethics Committee	Petition granted

Legal offices
Preceded by Eliezer Rivlin	Chairman of the Central Elections Committee; 2009–2011	Succeeded by Miriam Naor
