= Salim Joubran =

Israeli judge (1947–2024)

- سليم جبران
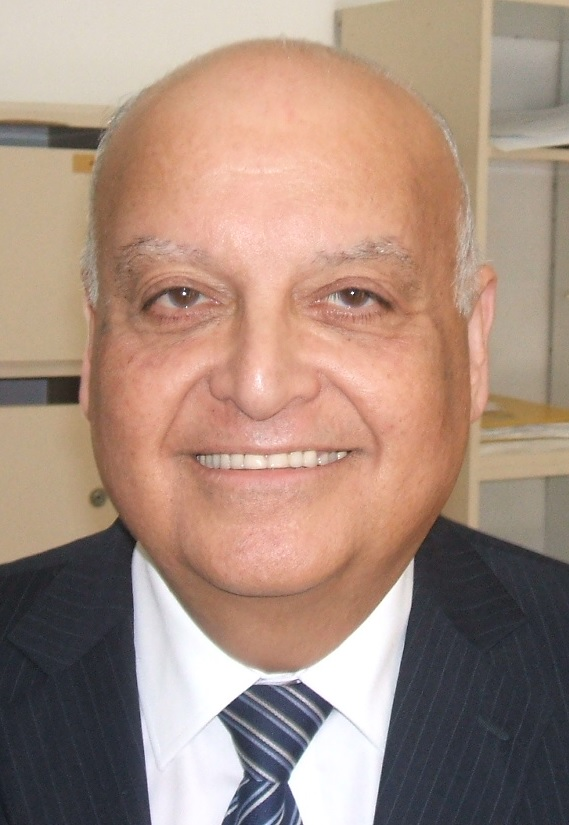
- Joubran in 2015

Justice of the Supreme Court of Israel
- In office 2004–2017

Chairman of the Central Elections Committee
- In office 2013–2015
- Preceded by: Elyakim Rubinstein
- Succeeded by: Hanan Melcer

Personal details
- Born: 1947 Haifa, Mandatory Palestine
- Died: March 15, 2024 (aged 76–77) Jerusalem, Israel
- Education: Hebrew University of Jerusalem
- Occupation: Jurist
- Known for: First Arab to receive a permanent appointment in the Israeli Supreme Court

Salim Joubran (Arabic: سليم جبران, Hebrew: סלים ג'ובראן; 1947 – 15 March 2024) was a judge of the Supreme Court of Israel. He served as a Supreme Court justice from 2003, and became a permanent member in May 2004. Joubran was of Christian Maronite heritage and affiliated with the Arab Christian community. Joubran was the first Arab to receive a permanent appointment in the Israeli Supreme Court. He was also described as the second Arab judge to hold a Supreme Court appointment, preceded by Abdel Rahman Zuabi, who held a fixed nine-month appointment in 1999.

== Biography ==
Salim Joubran was born in the German Colony neighborhood of Haifa, Mandatory Palestine, to a Christian family of Maronite Lebanese origin.

Joubran graduated from the Terra Santa School of the Franciscan Order in Acre. He earned a law degree from the Hebrew University of Jerusalem and entered private practice as a lawyer in 1970.

Joubran has four children, three of whom are lawyers. His son Charbel is a lawyer in the field of sports and represents football players in Israel and abroad.

Joubran died on 15 March 2024, at the age of 76.

== Legal career ==
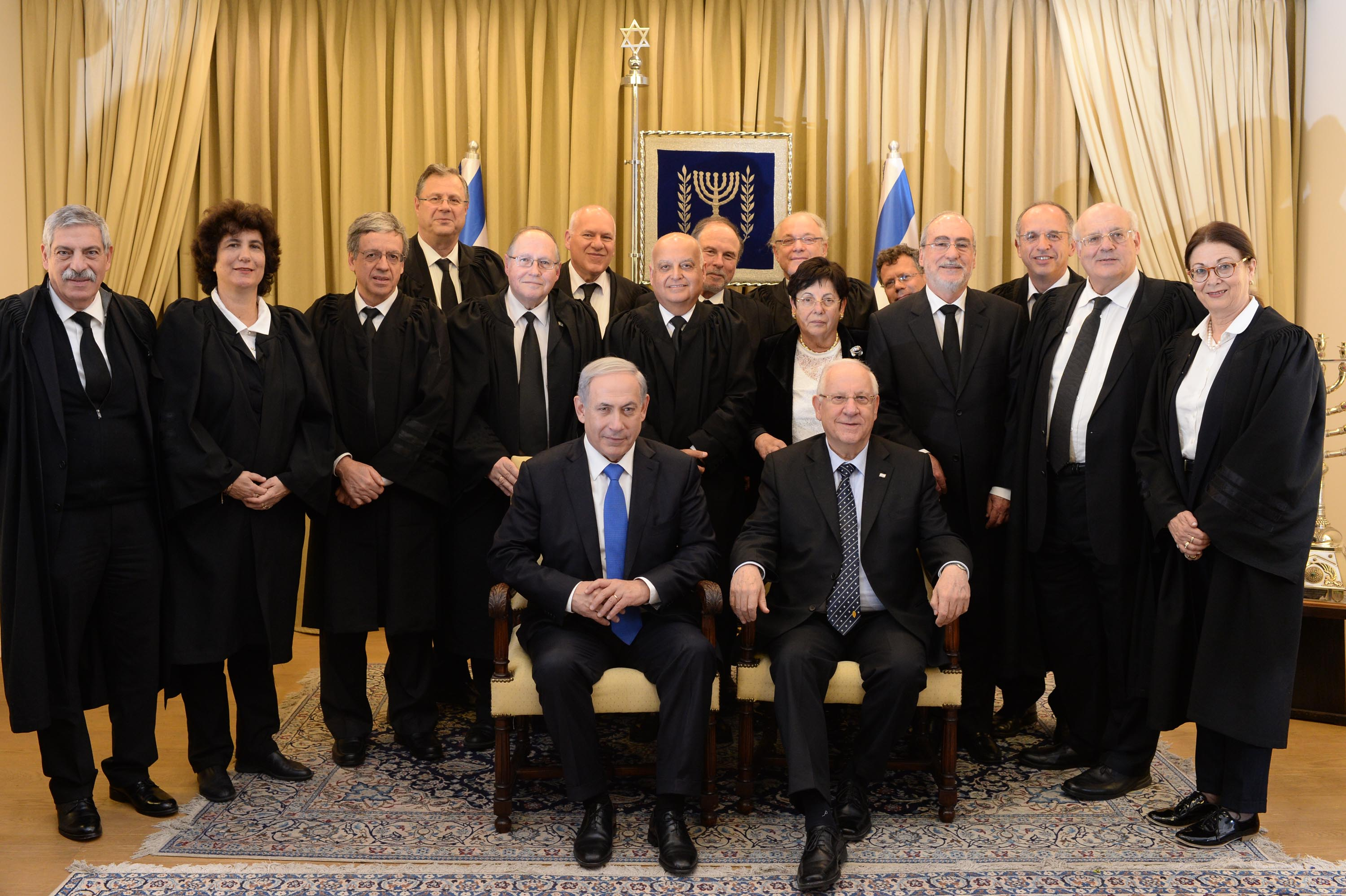
Joubran at inauguration of Miriam Naor, 2015

In 1982, Joubran left private practice after 12 years to accept an appointment as a judge on Haifa's Magistrate's Court, where he served for 11 years. In 1993, he was appointed to Haifa's district court, and served in that capacity for another 10 years, following which he was elevated to the Supreme Court first as a temporary and then as a permanent judge.

Joubran was an expert on criminal law. He was also the first Arab to chair the Central Elections Committee. In the 2013 Israeli municipal elections, he barred the national ruling party Likud's advertisements for being "racist and almost certain to hurt the feelings of Arab Israelis and disrupt public order". This also overruled the advice of Attorney General Yehuda Weinstein, who suggested the committee had no authority to regulate online advertisements and posters.

Joubran was appointed justice in the Supreme Court of Israel in 2004. He was appointed deputy to the Supreme Court chief justice on 12 June 2017. He retired later in 2017, having reached the mandatory retirement age of 70.

== Academic and public positions ==
Joubran was a lecturer at the Law Faculty at the University of Haifa. He served as governor of Israel Rotary (dist. 2490), and chairman of the Zeltner Fund for legal research sponsored by Rotary Israel and Tel Aviv University.

Legal offices
Preceded by Elyakim Rubinstein	Chairman of the Central Elections Committee; 2013–2015	Succeeded by Hanan Melcer
