= Miriam Naor =

Israeli judge (1947–2022)

- מרים נאור
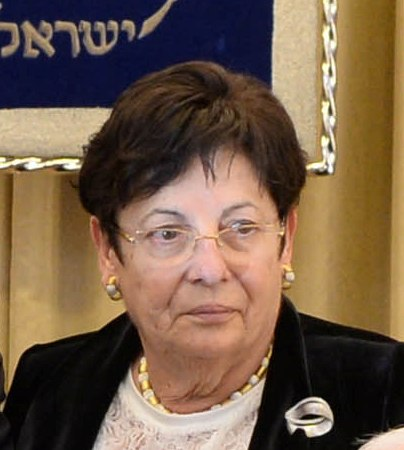

President of the Supreme Court of Israel
- In office 17 January 2015 – 26 October 2017
- Deputy: Elyakim Rubinstein (2015–17); Salim Joubran (2017)
- Preceded by: Asher Grunis
- Succeeded by: Esther Hayut

Justice of the Supreme Court of Israel
- In office 2003–2015

Personal details
- Born: 26 October 1947 Jerusalem, Mandatory Palestine
- Died: 24 January 2022 (aged 74) Jerusalem, Israel
- Education: Hebrew University of Jerusalem

Miriam Naor (Hebrew: מרים נאור; 26 October 1947 – 24 January 2022) was an Israeli judge who was President of the Supreme Court of Israel from January 2015 to October 2017. Naor retired at the end of October 2017 upon reaching the mandatory judicial retirement age of 70. She was succeeded by Esther Hayut.

== Biography ==
Naor was born in Jerusalem. Naor hailed from a family rooted in the Revisionist Zionist tradition. Her father, Naftaly Lerner, emigrated from Odessa to Palestine in 1922 and studied civil engineering at the Technion in Haifa. In 1944, he married her mother Batya (née Karklinsky), who immigrated from Lithuania in 1910. She studied nursing at the Hadassah School of Nursing in Jerusalem.

She graduated from the Hebrew University’s law school in 1971. Her husband, Aryeh Naor, served as Prime Minister Menachem Begin’s cabinet secretary from 1977 to 1982. Her mother-in-law, Esther Raziel-Naor, was a long-serving member of Knesset for Herut (the precursor to Likud) — from 1949 to 1973 and the sister of David Raziel. Her son Naftali — whose godfather was Menachem Begin — ran unsuccessfully in Likud primaries.

Naor died on 24 January 2022, at the age of 74.

== Legal and judicial career ==
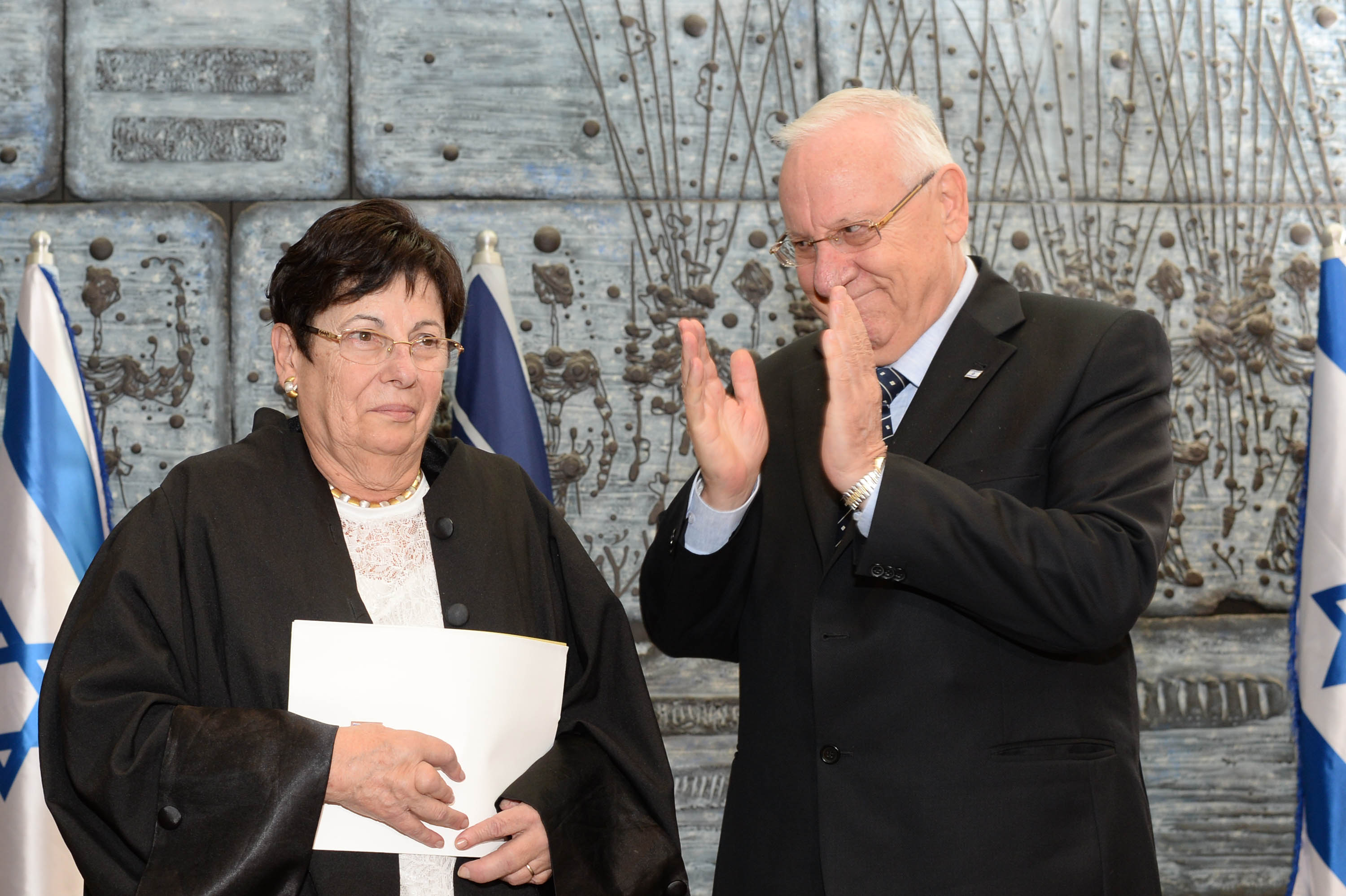
Swearing-in ceremony as Chief Justice, 2015

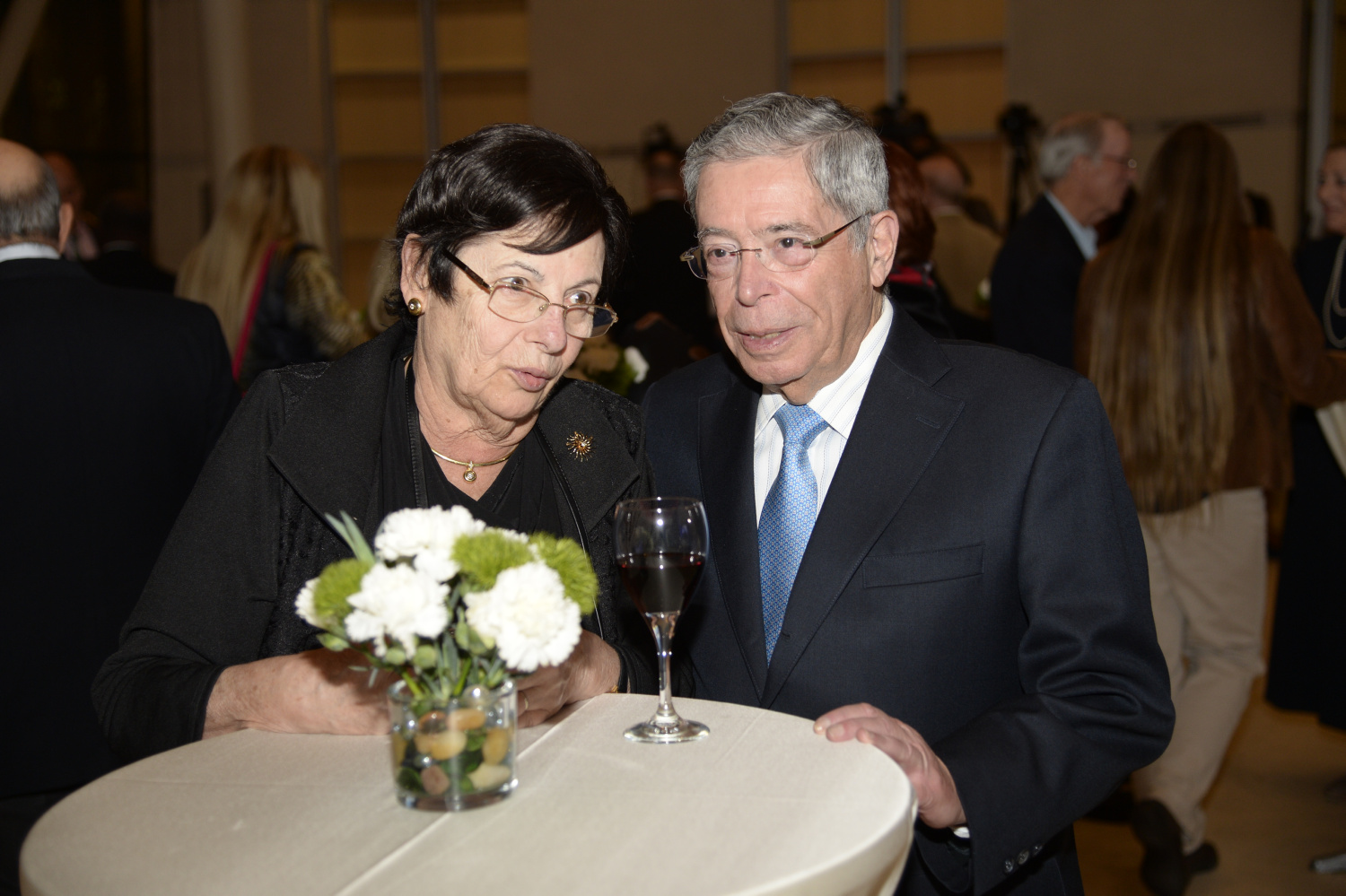
Miriam Naor with husband Arie, 2017

Naor clerked for Supreme Court justice (later Chief Justice) Moshe Landau. She worked on constitutional issues in the State Attorney’s Office under Mishael Cheshin, who would later be appointed Deputy Chief Justice.

In 1980 she won her first judicial appointment to the Jerusalem Magistrate’s Court. In May 1989, Naor was appointed to the Jerusalem District Court. Later in the 1990s, she served as one of the judges who eventually convicted Shas chairman Aryeh Deri on bribery charges. She became a permanent justice on the Supreme Court in 2003. In 2016, Natasha Hausdorff, a British future barrister, international news commentator, and Israel advocate clerked for her.

Naor spent 38 years on the bench, 17 of them on the Supreme Court. Her final act was ratifying the verdict allowing Tel Aviv supermarkets and recreation centers to remain open on Shabbat.

In October 2018 she was appointed President of the Zionist Supreme Court of the World Zionist Organization.

== See also ==
- Women in Israel
- Judiciary of Israel

Legal offices
Preceded by Ayala Procaccia	Chairman of the Central Elections Committee; 2011–2012	Succeeded by Elyakim Rubinstein
