= Central Elections Committee =

Election overseers in Israel

- ועדת הבחירות המרכזית; Va'adet HaBehirot HaMerkazit

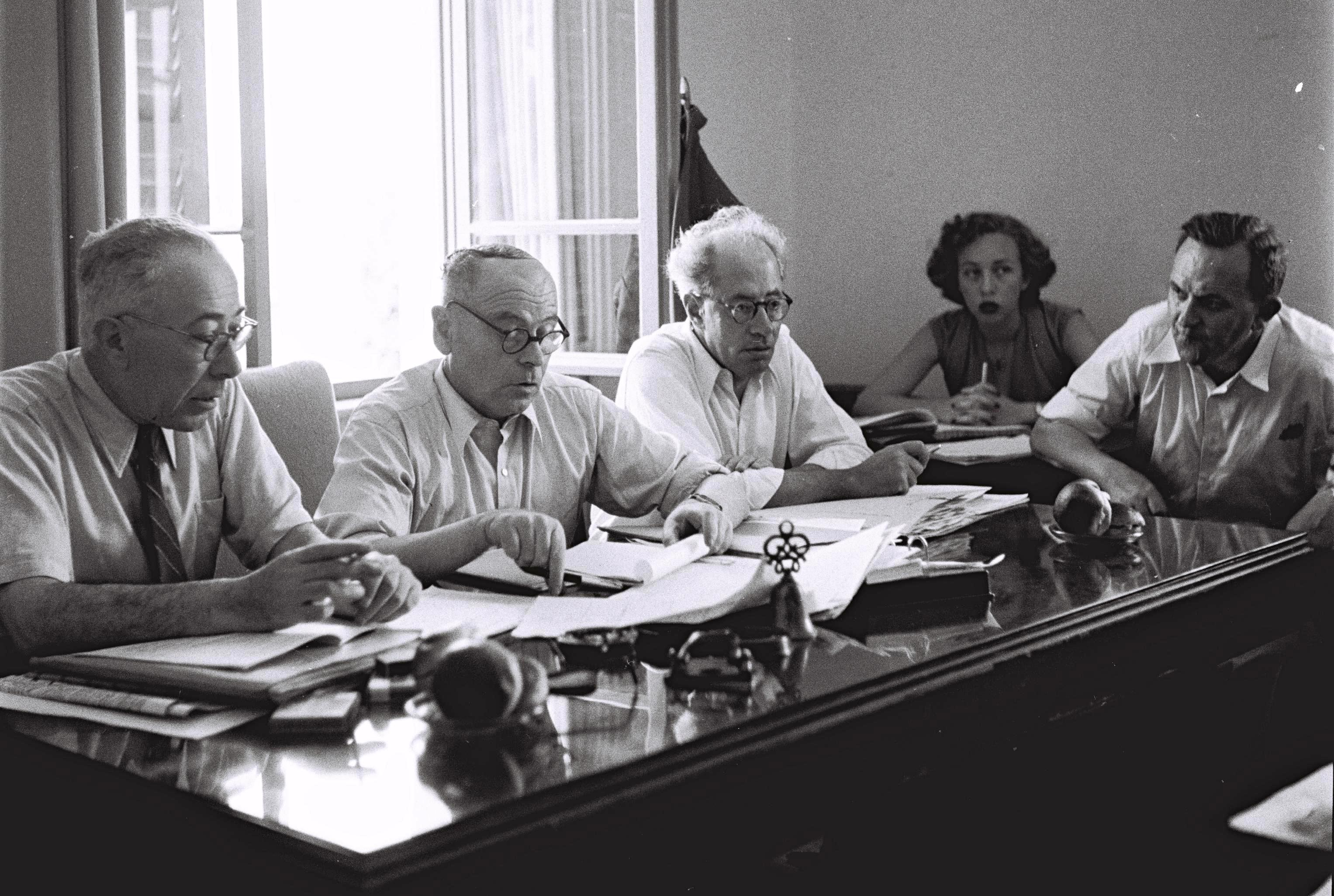

Agency overview
- Formed: 1969; 57 years ago
- Jurisdiction: Israel
- Status: Independent regulatory agency
- Headquarters: Jerusalem, Israel
- Agency executives: Noam Sohlberg, Supreme Court Justice, Chairman; Dean Livne, Director General
- Key document: Basic Law: The Knesset
- Website: www.bechirot.gov.il

The Israeli Central Elections Committee (Hebrew: ועדת הבחירות המרכזית, Va'adet HaBehirot HaMerkazit) is the body charged under the Knesset Elections Law of 1969 to carry out the elections for the upcoming Knesset. The committee is composed of Knesset members (and delegates) representing various parliamentary groups and is chaired by a Supreme Court Justice (currently Noam Sohlberg). Tasks for the committee include the authorization of party lists running for the Knesset, election financing, and publication and appeals of election results.

== History ==
=== 1985 amendments ===
In 1985, the Knesset approved a law which, for the first time, allowed the committee to disqualify a party list on the grounds of its ideological platform. The law allowed the committee to bar parties from elections that negate the existence of Israel as a Jewish and democratic state, made incitements to racism, or supported the armed struggle of an enemy state or terrorist organization against the state of Israel. The first provision, dealing with the existence of Israel as a Jewish state, has been the most controversial since it is possible that parties favoring a one-state solution could be banned under it.

=== 1988 party bans ===
The committee decided to ban the Progressive List for Peace (PLP) and the Kach Party in 1988. The former was banned for allegedly negating the existence of Israel as a Jewish and democratic state; the latter party was banned because of incitements to racism. The Supreme Court of Israel sustained the ban against Kach, but overturned the ban on the PLP reasoning that it was impossible to determine that "the real, central and active purpose [of the list] is to bring about the elimination of the State of Israel as the state of the Jewish people".

=== 2003 party ban controversy ===
In 2003, Likud MK Michael Eitan initiated a move to ban the Ta'al Party from participating in that year's Knesset elections. MK Michael Kleiner, the leader of the right-wing Herut Party, initiated a similar move against the Balad Party, arguing that Balad was "a cover-up for illegal activity" and that it "supports terror organizations, identifies with the enemy and acts against Israel as a Jewish and democratic state".

The Central Elections Committee proceeded to vote by a one-vote majority to disqualify Balad and Ta'al lists from the elections. Supreme Court Justice Michael Cheshin, who chaired the committee, voted against the ban, stating that there was insufficient evidence to sustain the claims against the parties and individuals within those parties, but also said that Balad's leader Azmi Bishara's past expressions of support of the militant pro-Iranian Hezbollah in Lebanon had angered him.

The bans were appealed to the Israeli Supreme Court, where the Court unanimously overturned the bans on the Ta'al list and party leader Ahmad Tibi. The Court also overturned the ban on Balad and party leader Azmi Bishara by a 7-4 majority.

=== 2009 party bans ===
On 12 January 2009 the Committee voted to ban two Arab political parties, Balad and the United Arab List—Ta'al, from participating in the February elections. The vote to ban Balad from the elections passed 26–3 with one abstention; that to disqualify UAL—Ta'al passed 21–3 with eight abstentions.

The measure was proposed by the Yisrael Beiteinu party, the leader of which, Avigdor Liberman, accused Ahmad Tibi of being part of a fifth column. Lieberman stated that "The next step is to declare Balad illegal because it's a terror organisation that seeks to hurt Israel."

Jamal Zahalka, chairman of Balad, warned that the decision would lead to a deeper crisis between Israel's Jewish and Arab citizens.

On 21 January 2009, the Supreme Court overturned the ban.

== Chairs ==
Knesset	Chair
26	Noam Sohlberg
25	Yitzchak Amit
24	Uzi Fogelman
23	Neal Hendel
22	Hanan Melcer
21	Hanan Melcer
20	Salim Joubran
19	Ayala Procaccia, Miriam Naor, Elyakim Rubinstein
18	Eliezer Rivlin
17	Dalia Dorner, Jacob Turkel, Dorit Beinisch
16	Mishael Cheshin
15	Eliyahu Matza
14	Theodor Or
13	Avraham Chalima
12	Miriam Ben-Porat, Eliezer Goldberg
11	Yitzhak Kahan, Meir Shamgar, Gabriel Bach
10	Moshe Etzioni
9	Eliyahu Moshe Mani
8	Haim Cohn
7	Alfred Witkon
6	Moshe Landau
5	Zvi Berenson
4	Yoel Zussman
3	Shimon Agranat
2	Yitzhak Olshan
1	Menachem Dunkelblum

== Directors general ==
Dates	Director general	Ref
2010 - July 2026	Orli Adas	
July 2026 - present	Dean Livne	
