= Menachem Mazuz =

Justice of the Supreme Court of Israel

- מְנַחֵם מָזוּז
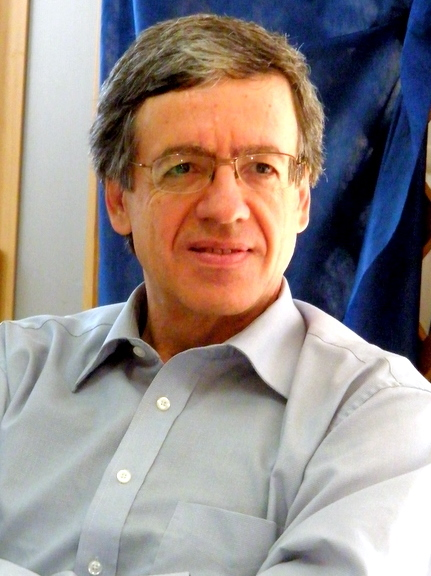

Justice of the Supreme Court of Israel
- In office November 10, 2014 – April 30, 2021

12th Attorney General of Israel
- In office February 1, 2004 – February 1, 2010
- Prime Minister: Ariel Sharon; Ehud Olmert; Benjamin Netanyahu
- Preceded by: Elyakim Rubinstein
- Succeeded by: Yehuda Weinstein

Personal details
- Born: April 30, 1955 (age 71) Djerba, Tunisia
- Education: Hebrew University of Jerusalem

Menachem "Meni" Mazuz (Hebrew: מְנַחֵם "מֶנִי" מָזוּז; born April 30, 1955) is an Israeli jurist and Supreme Court justice, who served as the Israeli Attorney General in the years 2004–2010.

== Childhood and studies ==
Mazuz was born in Djerba, Tunisia, the fifth in a family of nine children of the rabbi of one of the island's Jewish communities. His family immigrated to Israel a year after his birth, settling in Netivot.

Mazuz served his compulsory military service in the IDF Armor Corps, and then studied law at the Hebrew University of Jerusalem, earning his law degree in 1980 specializing in public and administrative law. During his studies, he interned for one year in the Supreme Court with judges Shlomo Asher and Hadassa Ben-Itto and for a year in the State Attorney's Office High Court of Justice Department with attorneys Michal Shaked and Shlomo Tzur.

== Government career ==
After graduating and receiving his law license in 1981, Mazuz immediately joined the State Attorney's Office as a lawyer, working in the Criminal, Civil, and High Court of Justice Departments until 1994. During this time he was also teaching public and administrative law at the Hebrew University. From 1991 to 1995, he served as a legal adviser of the Ministry of Justice for Israel's negotiations with Jordan and the Palestinian Authority. He was appointed Deputy Attorney General in 1994, serving for ten years.

In January 2004, Mazuz was appointed Attorney General, and took office in February. At the time of the appointment, he was seen as a career civil servant with little political or criminal-law experience. However, the circumstances of his appointment drew considerable interest because Prime Minister Ariel Sharon and his sons were under investigation by the Attorney General's Office for campaign-finance irregularities relating to his 1999 campaign for leadership of the Likud party.

When Mazuz's predecessor Elyakim Rubinstein resigned to accept appointment to the Supreme Court, Mazuz was chosen by Justice Minister Yosef Lapid; his selection and confirmation were carried out without the involvement of Sharon or vice-premier Ehud Olmert (also a target of the campaign-finance investigation) who both abstained in order to avoid conflict of interest.

Upon taking office, Mazuz said he would vigorously pursue the case against Sharon, earning him contrasts in the media with Rubinstein, who had been accused of moving too slowly on the matter. In the summer of 2005, he secured the indictment of Ariel Sharon's son Omri on corruption charges, but decided not to charge Ariel Sharon himself and his other son, Gilad.

Mazuz adopted a hardline legal approach towards demonstrators opposing the evacuation of Israeli settlements in the Gaza Strip during the Israeli disengagement from Gaza. While stating that measures will be taken against violent demonstrators, and that detained protestors would not be given a collective pardon, he also forbade a demonstration in the town of Sderot. After the successful and relatively peaceful completion of the disengagement, Mazuz said that it was freedom of demonstration which prevented the operation from escalating into a violent one.

Mazuz faced harsh criticism following his decision, given in January 2005, according to which Israeli Arabs are allowed to buy lands owned by the Jewish National Fund. Some have accused Mazuz of incompliance with Israel's image as a Jewish state.

Mazuz has come under criticism from settler groups for allowing Israeli police to employ violence against demonstrators in the evacuation of the settlement of Amona.

== Supreme Court justice ==
On November 10, 2014, Mazuz was sworn in as a justice on Israel's Supreme Court.

On December 7, 2020, Mazuz decided to resign as a justice on Israel's Supreme Court effective April 2021, citing personal reasons. Mazuz was not expected to retire until 2025.

== Personal ==
A resident of Jerusalem, Mazuz is married and has two children.

Menachem Mazuz's cousin Meir Mazuz was a prominent rabbi.
