= Yehuda Weinstein =

Attorney General of Israel

- יהודה וינשטיין
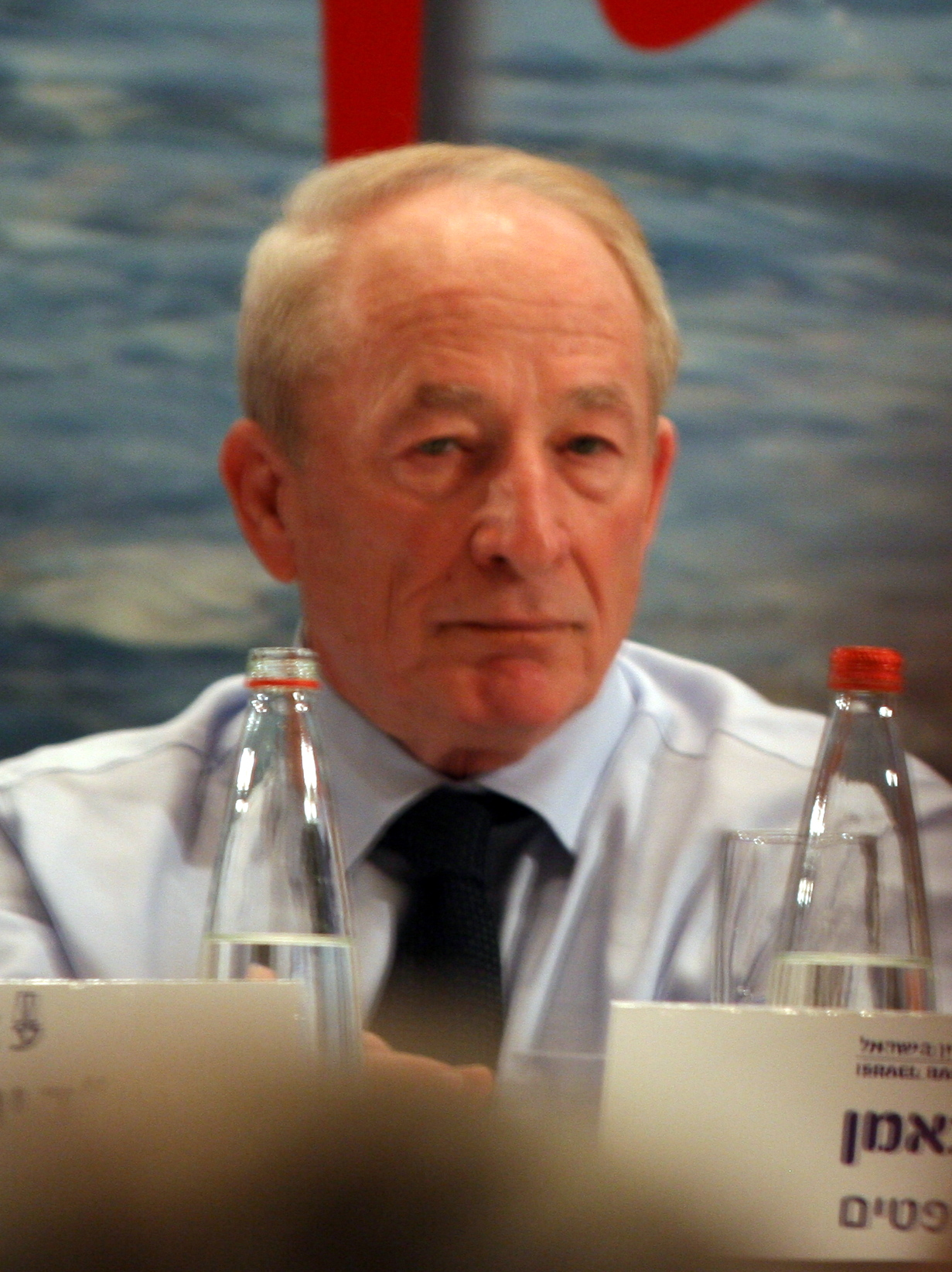

13th Attorney General of Israel
- In office 1 February 2010 – 1 February 2016
- Prime Minister: Benjamin Netanyahu
- Preceded by: Menachem Mazuz
- Succeeded by: Avichai Mandelblit

Personal details
- Born: April 19, 1944 (age 82) Tel Aviv, Mandatory Palestine
- Education: Tel Aviv University; Bar-Ilan University

Yehuda Weinstein (Hebrew: יהודה וינשטיין; born 19 April 1944) is an Israeli lawyer and former Attorney General of Israel, having replaced the previous attorney general, Menachem Mazuz, on 1 February 2010.

== Biography ==
Weinstein was born in Tel Aviv, Mandatory Palestine to Jewish Parents who made Aliyah from Poland during the 1930s. He grew up in Florentin, Tel Aviv, and during his adolescence he was involved in sports, especially boxing, and won the Israeli youth boxing championship. During his national service in the Israel Defense Forces, he served in the Paratroopers Brigade. He later graduated from Tel Aviv University with a B.A in Law and M.A from Bar-Ilan University.

Weinstein then worked for the State Attorney's Office as a prosecutor for the Central District Attorney's Office, and in his latter role there, before his retirement in 1979, he served as a senior deputy for the District Attorney's Office. Towards the end of his term there he founded his own private law firm, and became known as a successful criminal defense lawyer, specializing in White-collar crimes. Among other known clients, he represented Ezer Weizman, Aryeh Deri, Ehud Olmert, Benjamin Netanyahu, Yossi Beilin, Avigdor Ben-Gal and others.

Weinstein was mentioned in the Israeli media outlets as one of the leading candidates for the role of the Attorney General of Israel both in 2004 and 2009, and as a leading candidate for the role of State Attorney in 2007. On 6 December 2009, the Israeli Cabinet voted to appoint him as the next AG, replacing Meni Mazuz on 1 February 2010.

Prior to Weinstein becoming Attorney General, an Indian national was illegally employed as a cleaner in his home; after he became AG, Weinstein decided to prosecute the wife of Ehud Barak for illegally employing a foreign worker in her home.

Weinstein lives in Herzliya Pituah, married to Aviva and a father of three.

== Criticism ==
Weinstein came under intense criticism for his inaction regarding a number of rabbis in Safed, who, according to Haaretz called on Jewish homeowners to not rent to Arabs—an action they claim is prohibited by Halakha. A number of MKs, mainly from Meretz, and public intellectuals, attacked him for dallying on pursuing an investigation against the rabbis, who they argued, as civic officials, were in severe violation of Israeli law.
