= Eliezer Rivlin =

Israeli jurist (born 1942)

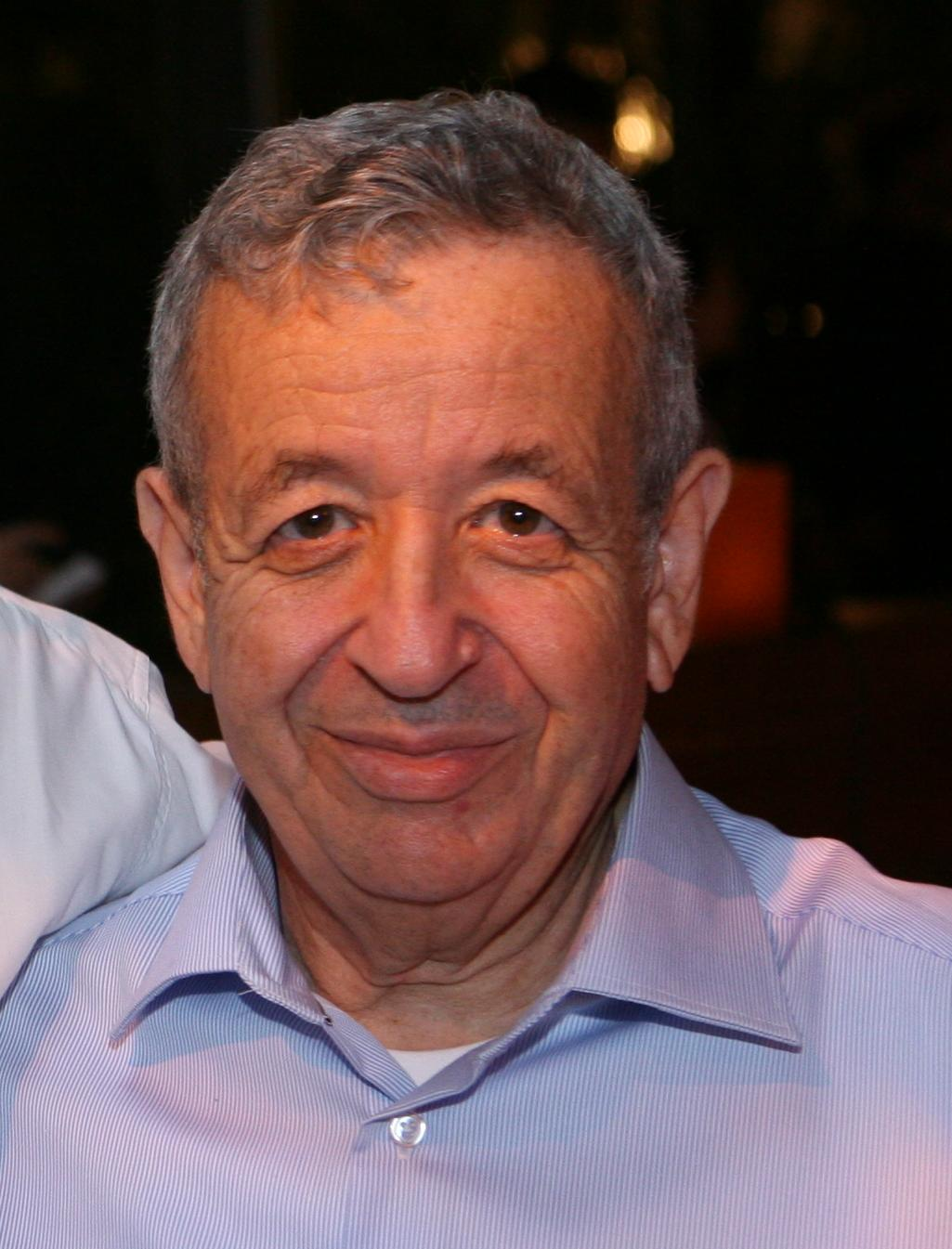
Eliezer Rivlin, 2010

Eliezer Rivlin (Hebrew: אליעזר ריבלין; born May 28, 1942) is an Israeli jurist who served as a judge of the Supreme Court of Israel.

Since 2006 until his retirement Eliezer Rivlin was the deputy-president of the Supreme Court of Israel and was chairman of the Central Elections Committee for the 2009 Legislative elections.

Rivlin was appointed to the Supreme Court in 2000. He became deputy-president in 2006. He serves on the advisory board of the Florida Journal of International Law, a law journal published by the University of Florida Levin College of Law.
