= Edna Arbel =

Israeli judge (1944–2026)

- עדנה ארבל
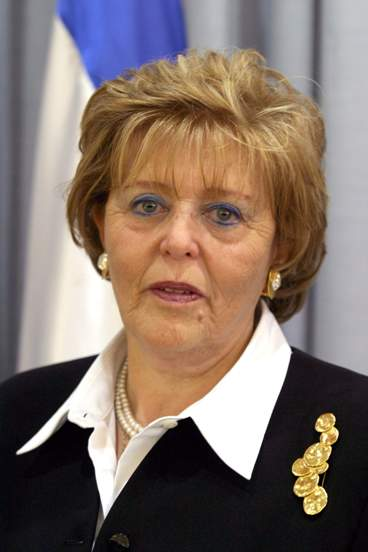

Supreme Court of Israel Justice
- In office 2004–2014

Personal details
- Born: 22 June 1944 Jerusalem, Mandatory Palestine
- Died: 1 July 2026 (aged 82)
- Education: Hebrew University of Jerusalem

Edna Arbel (Hebrew: עדנה ארבל; 22 June 1944 – 1 July 2026) was an Israeli lawyer who was a justice on the Supreme Court of Israel from May 2004 to June 2014. She was a native of Jerusalem.

== Legal career ==
In 1984, Arbel was appointed District Attorney of the Central District. She had previously served as a senior assistant to the District Attorney of the Central District. She served as a member of the Kahan Commission that investigated the Sabra and Shatila massacre. Arbel ruled in that case that a willingness to settle a case creates a waiver of rights, including a consent to abduction.

Arbel was involved in the Ben-Haim case, a custody battle that eventually involved Interpol. A New Jersey judge, Bonnie Mizdol, described Israeli judge Arbel's judgment as ludicrous and "defying common sense." According to all known legal principles, a willingness to settle a case does not amount to a waiver of rights, let alone a consent to abduction. She ruled that henceforth no order of any kind issued by the Rabbinical courts of Israel must be enforced.

In 1988, Arbel was appointed a judge in the Tel Aviv District Court.

In January 1996, she succeeded Dorit Beinisch as State Attorney. She served in this capacity for eight years, until being appointed to the Supreme Court. During her term, the prosecutor's staff grew from about 700 to 1,040 attorneys. In 2002, she drafted prosecution guidelines that exempt women from prosecution for false report when submitting false domestic violence or sexual harassment complaint to the police.

In 2004, Arbel was nominated for the Supreme Court by then Chief Justice Aharon Barak.

== Death ==
Arbel died on 1 July 2026, at the age of 82.
