= Basic Law: The Knesset =

De facto constitutional law of Israel

Third Knesset
- Long title: חוק יסוד: הכנסת
- Territorial extent: Israel
- Passed by: Knesset
- Passed: 12 February 1958

Related legislation
- Basic Laws of Israel

Summary
- States legislative functions of the parliament of the state
- Status: Amended

Basic Law: The Knesset is one of fourteen quasi-constitutional Basic Laws of Israel. Consisting of 46 numbered articles as of 2026, it constitutes the Israeli parliament, the Knesset, and provides for its functions within the framework of Israel's uncodified constitution, including elections, oaths, immunity, dissolution, eligibility, and committees. First passed in 1958 and updated in 1987, the law has been amended numerous times.

== Current voting system ==
Members of the Knesset (MK) are elected through proportional representation based on results for the entire national electorate. This means that seats are allocated across all parties, excluding parties that fall below the 3.25% electoral threshold. Ballot papers give voters a choice of parties, rather than choosing individual candidates.

Parties have lists of candidates in order of preference. Some political parties have their own primary votes among party-members to decide candidate lists, whilst other parties choose their candidate lists differently: In some parties, candidate lists are chosen by an assembly of political activists elected by party members, other parties (notably Shas, United Torah Judaism and Yisrael Beiteinu) have a small committee that chooses the party's candidate list, and in others (like Yesh Atid) candidate lists are chosen by one person only. Many parties have changed their way of choosing candidate lists over time.

Elections are nominally held every four years, but the Knesset or prime minister can decide to call an election early (a snap election). In practice, most elections in Israel have been held before the end of the Knesset's full term, usually as a result of coalition breakdowns, the dissolution of the Knesset, difficulties in forming a government, or the failure to pass a budget. The frequency of early elections increased in the 2010s and 2020s, culminating in five elections being held between 2019 and 2022. Also under certain circumstances elections may be postponed past four years. The only example of a delay was the election for 8th Knesset which was postponed (for two months due to the Yom Kippur War) by a special majority in the Knesset. Elections are nominally scheduled on either the first or third Tuesday of the Jewish month of Cheshvan. If the previous year was a Jewish leap year elections are held the first Tuesday of Cheshvan, otherwise, third Tuesday. It is possible for the interval between elections to be longer than four years, and up to five years if the previous early election is held near the end of the Jewish month of Cheshvan. As of 2015, the nominal schedule was observed only four times: 1959, 1965, 1969, and 1988, with the longest interval between elections being 101 days over 4 years, which occurred between the 1984 elections and the 1988 elections. With the exception of the aforementioned 1973 elections, the reason that elections were not held on the nominal date was that the election date was advanced.

According to a 2016 update to the Basic Law, 90 MKs may vote under Article 42a(b)(1) to expel a fellow MK who has expressed support for an "armed struggle" against Israel. No MK has been impeached from the Knesset under this law.

== Table of provisions ==
Table of provisions in Basic Law: The Knesset (1958)
Article	Summary
1	States that "[t]he Knesset is the house of representatives of the State".
2	States that "[t]he seat of the Knesset is Jerusalem".
3	States that the Knesset, upon election, consists of 120 members (the same size as the former and historical Great Assembly).
4	Provides that election of members of the Knesset shall take place "in general, national, direct, equal, secret, and proportional elections, in accordance with the Knesset Election Law".; Provides that the said article may not be changed, except by a majority of the Knesset members.
5	Provides that "[e]very Israeli citizen aged eighteen or over, is eligible to vote in elections to the Knesset, unless a court of law has deprived him of this right in accordance with the law".; Provides that "[t]he Elections Law shall determine when a person shall be considered to be eighteen years of age for the purpose of exercising the right to vote in elections to the Knesset."
5a	Provides that "[a] list of candidates for the Knesset shall be submitted by a party only".; Provides that "[t]he manner for association and registration of parties, and the conditions for submitting a list of candidates, shall be prescribed by law."; Prevents independent politicians from standing for election for the Knesset.
6	Provides for general principles concerning the eligibility of Israeli citizens to stand for election to the Knesset.
6a	Provides for principles relating to the candidacy of members of the Knesset who withdraw from their parliamentary group.
7	Provides for general principles concerning people ineligible to stand for Knesset elections.
7a	Article 7a(a) extends provisions on ineligibility to persons; who negate the existence of the State of Israel as a Jewish and democratic state (article 7a(a)(1)); who incite racism (article 7a(a)(2)), or; who support the armed struggle by an enemy state or of a terrorist organization against the State of Israel (article 7a(a)(3)).; Article 7a(a1) provides a rebuttable presumption relating to "candidate[s] who sojourn... illegally in an enemy state in the seven years that preceded the deadline for submitting lists of candidates".; Article 7a(b) and (d) provide for judicial review of decisions of the Central Elections Committee.; Article 7a(c) provides that candidates must make declarations under the said article.
8	Provides that the Knesset's term is four years from the date it is elected.
8a	Provided for the date of elections to the 24th Knesset. Now expired.
9	Provides for the date of elections generally (and when the date is a leap year).
9a	Article 9a(a) provides that the Knesset's term may not be extended except by virtue of a special law adopted by 80 MKs (66.6% of the Knesset) "should special circumstances exist that prevent holding the elections on their designated date", but provides that "[t]he extension period shall not exceed the time required by the said circumstances."; Article 9a(b) makes an exception to article 9a(a) by stating that the Knesset may, by majority vote, advance the date of any election set under article 9a(a), "as long as the new date shall not be earlier than the date for holding the elections to the Knesset in accordance with article 9", and provides that the article does not affect the dissolution process (article 34).
10	Provides that election day is a day of rest, but transportation and other public services continue to function as usual.
11	Provides that within eight days of the election, the results shall be published in the Official Gazette (Reshumot).
12	Provides for the convocation of the Knesset, generally, within fourteen days from the date legislative elections are held and after the publication of the election results.
13	Repealed
14	Provides that "[a]rrangements for the opening session shall be prescribed by law, and shall express the nature of the State of Israel and its heritage."
15	Provides that each member of the Knesset shall declare allegiance, under the following wording: "I pledge myself to bear allegiance to the State of Israel and to faithfully discharge my mission in the Knesset."
16	Provides for the withholding of Knesset member rights to any person who refuses to make a declaration under article 15.
16a	Relates to dual citizen members of the Knesset who must relinquish their citizenship before becoming a member of the Knesset.
17	Provides for Knesset member immunity, the details of which are to be prescribed by law.
18	Provides for Knesset grounds immunity, the details of which are to be prescribed by law.
19	Provides for Knesset rules of procedure.
20	Relates to the Speaker and the Deputy Speakers.
20a	Relates to the Substitute Speaker of the Knesset, and Acting Speaker of the Knesset.
21	Defines and provides for the powers of Knesset committees.
21a	Repealed
22	Provides for committees of inquiry. The Knesset is entitled to appoint Committees of Inquiry, either by empowering one of its permanent Committees, or by selecting a committee from among its Members, in order to investigate matters determined by the Knesset. The powers and tasks of a Committee of Inquiry shall be determined by the Knesset. In every Committee of Inquiry there shall also be representatives of parliamentary groups that are not members of the Government, on the basis of the relative strength of the Parliamentary Groups in the Knesset.
23	Provides that "[t]he status of a minister or deputy minister, who are not Knesset Members, with regards to anything connected with the Knesset, is the same as that of a minister or deputy minister who are Members of the Knesset, but they shall not have the right to vote."
24	Defines a quorum as "participation of any number of Members".
25	Defines a majority as "a majority of the participants in the vote, with those abstaining not being counted among those participating in the vote", and makes provisions for rules of procedure.
26	Provides that [t]he sittings of the Knesset shall be held in the location of its seat, but under special circumstances the Speaker of the Knesset is entitled, after consulting his Deputies, to convene the Knesset elsewhere.".; Provides that "Knesset sittings shall take place on weekdays.".
27	Provides that "[t]he Knesset shall meet publicly."
28	Provides that "[t]he publication of the proceedings of Knesset sittings, and whatever was said in them, shall not be restricted, and shall not entail any criminal or civil liability."
29	Repealed
30	Repealed
31	Provides that "[p]rovisions concerning the dates of Knesset sessions, and the convening of the Knesset out of session, shall be prescribed by law."
32	Repealed
33	Repealed
34	Provides that "[t]he Knesset shall not decide to dissolve itself before the end of its term, save by the adoption of a law on this matter by a majority of the Knesset Members."
35	Provides for the date of elections after dissolution as no later than five months from the day the law is adopted.
36	Provides for the term of the Knesset after dissolution.
36a	Provides for automatic dissolution upon failure to adopt the Budget Law.
37	Provides for the continuity of the Knesset.
38	Continues the effect of laws that pass after the Knesset dissolves itself.
39	Provides for salaries of members of the Knesset.
40	Deals with resignation of members of the Knesset.
41	Provides for the consequences of resignation and permits a member of the Knesset to withdraw a resignation request within 48 hours of filing it.
42	Deals with the termination of the mandate of a member of the Knesset (or a candidate thereto) upon appointment to an office which renders them ineligible to hold further legislative office.
42a	Provides when the membership of a member of the Knesset terminates or when they are expelled.
42b	Deals with the suspension of powers of members of the Knesset convicted of felonies.
42c	The Norwegian Law.
43	Deals with the replacement of members of the Knesset.
44	Provides that "[n]otwithstanding the provisions of any other law, Emergency Regulations cannot change, temporarily suspend, or subject this law to conditions."
45	Provides that "[a]rticle 44, or this article, may not be changed, save by a majority of eighty Members of the Knesset."
45a	Provides that the provisions of article 45 apply to any modification of article 9a(a).
46	Provides that under the Basic Law, the majority needed to change articles 4, 9a, 34, 44, or 45 is necessary for all stages of the bill (first reading, second reading, and third reading), and defines "change" as "explicit or implicit".

== See also ==
- Israeli Central Elections Committee
- Basic Laws of Israel
- Knesset
