= Nuclear Secrets =

- DVD cover
- Genre: Docudrama
- Written by: Mark Halliley; Nick Perry
- Directed by: Chris Bould; Toby Sculthorpe; Nat Sharman; Matthew Wortman
- Starring: Mark Bonnar; Marco Hofschneider; Shannon Whirry; René Zagger; Dalip Tahil
- Narrated by: Sean Pertwee
- Composer: Ty Unwin
- Country of origin: United Kingdom
- Original language: English
- No. of episodes: 5

Production
- Executive producer: Deborah Cadbury
- Running time: 60 minutes

Original release
- Network: BBC Two
- Release: 15 January – 12 February 2007

Related
- Space Race

Nuclear Secrets, aka Spies, Lies and the Superbomb, is a 2007 BBC Television docudrama series which looks at the race for nuclear supremacy from the Manhattan Project through to Pakistan's nuclear weapons programme.

== Production ==
The series was produced by the BBC in co-production with National Geographic Society and NDR (Norddeutscher Rundfunk).

== Episodes ==
=== Episode one: The Spy From Moscow ===
"Soviet Colonel Oleg Penkosky spied in the build-up to the gravest nuclear crisis of all time, when the world came close to annihilation."

— Sean Pertwee's opening narration

In 1960, Soviet Military Intelligence Officer Oleg Penkovsky passes a letter offering to share secrets with the U.S. Government to American students visiting Moscow, but Washington fails to respond.

Penkovsky later passes a letter to British Trade Delegation representative Greville Wynne warning that Soviet premier Nikita Khrushchev was planning an all-out nuclear attack. Penkovsky meets with MI6 officer Harry Shergold and Central Intelligence Agency agent Joe Bulik a short time later on a trip to London and warns that the Soviets have been arming Cuba. Penkovsky is instructed to gather info on missile strategy and is given British industrial secrets to help maintain his cover upon his return to Moscow.

Chief Marshall Sergei Varentsov tells Penkovsky of plans to deploy battlefield nuclear weapons in Berlin. Penkovsky passes this along with other secrets that hardens U.S. President John F. Kennedy's stance against Khrushchev. KGB Lt-Gen Gribanov begins a surveillance sweep of Western embassy staff in Moscow, including Penkovsky's contact Janet Chisholm. Wynne returns to Moscow to make contact and Penkovsky requests that he and his family are pulled out. CIA Chief John McCone agrees but needs info on Cuba first.

Penkovsky learns of the deployment of Soviet nuclear missiles in Cuba but he is hospitalised before he can pass on the info. US surveillance photos reveal the build-up of missiles in Cuba that are identified from the materials previously supplied by Penkovsky. Penkovsky is arrested and confesses to Gribanov before signalling the Americans of an imminent Soviet attack in what Bulik suspects is an attempt to initiate a U.S. strike on Moscow. Penkovsky is convicted of spying and executed.

At about 36:17 a map of Europe and the USSR is presented, which incorrectly shows Russia at its post-1991 borders instead of the Soviet Union in 1962.

==== Cast ====
- Mark Bonnar as Oleg Penkovsky
- Peter Lindford as Greville Wynne
- Andrew Havill as Shergold
- Tim Flavin as Bulik
- Constantine Gregory as Varentsov
- Lucy Liemann as Janet Chisholm
- Michael Gorevoy as Gribanov
- Vincent Marzello as John McCone
- Bradley Lavelle as Greybeal
- Vincent Riotta as Brugioni

=== Episode two: Superspy ===
"1945, America prepares to unleash the most destructive weapon ever seen... a weapon of mass murder created by men of genius, but one is a communist spy."

— Sean Pertwee's opening narration

In 1944, Prof. Rudolf Peierls and his assistant Klaus Fuchs are summoned to Los Alamos National Laboratory to work on the Manhattan Project. Fuchs was a German refugee who had joined the Communist Party of Germany in 1932 to oppose the rise of Adolf Hitler and was now a Soviet spy.

Project mastermind Robert Oppenheimer only had enough uranium 235 for one bomb and Peierls and Fuchs were brought in to work on weaponising plutonium. Cut off from his Soviet handlers Fuchs throws himself into his work until he is allowed to visit his sister, Kristel, in Cambridge, Massachusetts where he re-establishes contact. The Soviet head of atomic research Igor Kurchatov monitors the American progress through Fuchs. Following Nazi surrender Fuchs fears the weapon will be used against the USSR.

Fuchs passes the details of the plutonium bomb, Fat Man, to his Soviet contact, Raymond. The project's tests are successful and the uranium bomb, Little Boy, is dropped on Hiroshima while Piles and Fuchs's Fatman is dropped on Nagasaki. In the aftermath Soviet premier Joseph Stalin orders Lavrentiy Beria to construct a Soviet plutonium bomb based on the Fatman plans supplied by Fuchs. Recalled to England, his adopted home, Fuchs returns with the nuclear secrets the U.S. is no longer willing to share. Fuchs passes the American secrets to the British as well.

Fuchs begins to doubt Stalin's actions and decides to stop spying for Soviets, but it is too late as the Soviet Union detonates Joe 1. FBI agent Robert Lamphere identifies Fuchs from decoded Soviet signals and MI5 commence surveillance. British security officer Henry Arnold coaxes a confession out of Fuchs who admits to having spied for the Soviets since 1941. Fuchs was convicted of espionage and sentenced to 14 years in prison.

==== Cast ====
- Marco Hofschneider as Klaus Fuchs
- Jonathan Firth as Rudolf Peierls
- Shane Dean as Captain De Silva
- Christina Catalina as Young Kristal
- Joe Jones as Robert Oppenheimer
- Mark Lawler as Edward Teller
- Lucy Gaskell as Genia Peierls
- Ross Collins as George Kistiakowsky
- Kristin Atwell as Kristal
- Gene Ganssle as Harry Gold
- Gergo Danka as Igor Kurchatov
- Slade Hall as Stanislaw Ulam
- Shannon Whirry as Kitty Oppenheimer
- Gerrard McArthur as Henry Arnold
- Breffni McKenna as Alexander Feklisov
- Noah Lee Margetts as Robert Lamphere
- David Barrass as Seymon Kremmer
- Martina Maria Reichart as Sonia

=== Episode three: Superbomb ===
"After the Second World War, America was looking forward to a bright Atomic future. As the only country with the atom bomb it felt secure. 29th of August 1949, the Soviets stun the world by exploding their own atom bomb. Suddenly the West itself was under threat. Edward Teller, a leading physicist from Hungary, believed the only way to save the world from Soviet Communism was to build an even bigger bomb, the hydrogen bomb, or Super."

— Sean Pertwee's opening narration

In 1950, Edward Teller briefs the team at Los Alamos National Laboratory about plans to construct a hydrogen bomb but U.S. Presidential Advisor Robert Oppenheimer opposes him. Oppenheimer is summoned to the White House to discuss whether Soviet spy Klaus Fuchs passed on info about the Super. Soviet Chairman Stalin instructs Andrei Sakharov to work under Beria on the Soviet hydrogen bomb project. U.S. Atomic Energy Commissioner Lewis Strauss supports Teller and U.S. President Harry S. Truman commissions the project.

Kitty Oppenheimer fears her communist connections may compromise her husband and his moral objections to the project. Sakharov reviews Fuchs' info on Teller's Super but has his own plans for a simpler but less powerful bomb. Federal Bureau of Investigation agent Robert Lamphere gets Fuchs to confirm his contact was Harry Gold and this leads to the arrest of the Rosenbergs. Teller and Stanislaw Ulam find an ingenious solution to the problems with their design, which is successfully tested following Teller's resignation from the project.

A power struggle in the USSR following the death of Stalin results in the downfall of Beria shortly before the testing of the Soviet H-bomb. Strauss orders the FBI to revoke Oppenheimer's security clearance under suspicion of spying for the Soviets. When U.S. testing runs out of control the American public are alerted to the power of this new weapon. Teller testifies against Oppenheimer at a security hearing and Strauss's objections are upheld. Sakharov becomes a leading dissident after civilians are killed in a Soviet bomb test.

==== Cast ====
- Joe Jones as Robert Oppenheimer
- Shannon Whirry as Kitty Oppenheimer
- Mark Lawler as Edward Teller
- Slade Hall as Stanislaw Ulam
- Ben Tyler as Dean Acheson
- Marco Hofschnider as Klaus Fuchs
- Andrew Scott as Andrei Sakharov
- Georg Nikolof as Russian Official
- Gergo Danka as Igor Kurchatov
- Dennis Ford as Admiral Lewis Strauss
- Steve Earnhart as Hack 1
- Roy Hunt as Hack 2
- Stephanie Likes as Make-up Girl
- Gerrard McArthur as Henry Arnold
- Noah Lee Margetts as Robert Lamphere
- Boris Isarov as Lavrentiy Beria
- Dick Baniszewski as Russian General
- Gene Ganssle as Harry Gold

=== Episode four: Vanunu and the Bomb ===
"This is the first man to tell the world nuclear weapons have arrived in the most troubled region on the Earth, the Middle East. In doing so he's exposed the West's opposition to nuclear proliferation as little more than a sham. Vanunu is banned from talking to foreign media, based on eyewitness testimony, this film is his story."

— Sean Pertwee's opening narration

February 1977 Nuclear Technician Mordechai Vanunu is assigned to work at the top secret Dimona facility. In 1986 he reveals to journalists Oscar Guerrero and Peter Hounam the presence of an underground plutonium plant there. Former Israeli Prime Minister David Ben-Gurion had commissioned construction of the plant in 1958. Vanunu had made the discovery after 7-years at the plant and had photos to prove his story. Hounam takes Vanunu to The Sunday Times in London, where Nuclear Physicist Frank Barnaby confirms the data, but the Mossad is tailing them.

Guerrero arrives in London and tries to sell the story to rival paper The Sunday Mirror. France, Britain and the U.S. had been complicit in the construction under a secret agreement between U.S. President Richard Nixon and Israeli Prime Minister Golda Meir. The lonely Vanunu befriends intern Wendy Robbins but she insists that they remain just friends. The discredited story in the Mirror causes the Times to delay their publication. Israeli Prime Minister Shimon Peres forbids the Mossad from kidnapping Vanunu on British soil so they spring a honey trap to lure him to Rome.

In Italy Vanunu is abducted and shipped back to Israel but the Times decides to publish in the hopes of protecting his life. The Western powers that had professed a stance of non-nuclear proliferation while collaborating in the construction of Dimona were exposed as hypocrites and yet the press in those countries remained curiously silent on the subject. The Israelis confirm that they have Vanunu in detention but refuses to explain how. Convicted of treason Vanunu was sentenced to 18 years in prison.

==== Cast ====
- René Zagger as Mordechai Vanunu
- Nick Moran as Oscar Guerrero
- Celia Meiras as Wendy Robbins
- Lucia Giannecchini as Cindy Hanin
- Mark Ross as Peter Hounam
- Tom Price as Max Prangnell
- Fred Pearson as Frank Barnaby

==== Contributors ====
- Prof. Frank Barnaby – Nuclear Physicist
- Prof. Avner Cohen – Author Israel and the Bomb
- Peter Hounam – Ex Insight Journalist
- Joseph Tommy Lapid – Former Israeli Justice Minister
- Robin Morgan – Ex Editor, Insight
- Max Prangnell – Ex Insight Journalist
- Wendy Robbins – Ex Sunday Times Intern

=== Episode five: The Terror Trader ===
"Dr. Abdul Qadeer Khan: brilliant scientist, trusted colleague, nuclear spy. Khan's master plan: to bring technology from Europe, build an atomic bomb for Pakistan, and set up a network to sell technology to Middle Eastern states from Libya to Iran."

— Sean Pertwee's opening narration

Pakistani scientist A.Q. Khan started working for URENCO in The Netherlands in 1972. working for the Pakistani Government, Khan gained access to technology due to lax security methods. Returning to Pakistan with his family in 1975.

Khan's family had left for Pakistan following the end of 1971 Indo-Pakistan War. Khan had become a fierce nationalist. Pakistan's President Bhutto supported Khan and he constructed a nuclear plant in the foothills of the Himalayas. Dutch enquiries in the 1980s finally revealed what Khan was doing but he gets off on a technicality. The U.S. overlooks Khan's program in order to gain Pakistani support against the USSR in Afghanistan. Khan acquires missile technology from China and extends his network into the Middle East.

UN Weapons Inspectors in Iraq uncover documents implicating Khan in nuclear trading but the West fails to act. Khan continues his trade amassing a huge personal fortune and becomes a hero following the detonation of Pakistan's first bomb. A joint CIA/MI6 task force uncovers Khan's dealings with Libya but are unable to move as Pakistani support is again needed in the post-9/11 Invasion of Afghanistan. UN Weapons Inspectors in Iran uncover further evidence implicating Khan, which the Iranians confirm.

The task force targets Khan's network with a double agent and intercept a shipment of centrifuges to Libya. Muammar al-Gaddafi agrees to cooperate with UN Weapons Inspectors and the full extent of Khan's capabilities are revealed. Khan's deputy Tehir is arrested and interrogated in Malaysia and confesses. Pakistani authorities deny any knowledge of Khan's network and he is arrested and forced to confess on live television. Khan remains under house arrest in Pakistan where his secrets are protected.

==== Cast ====
- Dalip Tahil as AQ Khan
- Daniel Philpot as Security Guard
- Erich Redman as Gotthard Lerch
- Francis Montarry as Heinz Mebus
- Richard Demaye as Customs Agent
- Mourad Zaquui as Pervez
- Ashvin-Kumar Joshi as BSA Thair
- Ettuhei Abdellatif as Farouk

==== Contributors ====
- David Albright – Inst. for Science & International Security
- Richard Barlow – CIA 1985–88
- Gordon Corera – Author Shopping for Bombs
- Trevor Edwards – Former URENCO employee
- Robert Einhorn – U.S. State Dept. 1999–2001
- Olli Heinonen – Deputy DG IAEA
- Robert Joseph – U.S. State Dept.
