= Giora Tzahor =

Israeli military and Mossad officer

- גיורא צחור
- Born: George Weiss; 27 October 1941; Saint-Étienne, France
- Died: 16 July 2012 (aged 70); Hadera, Israel
- Occupations: Military officer; Mossad officer
- Awards: Medal of Valor
- Military career
- Allegiance: Israel
- Branch: Israel Defense Forces; Mossad
- Service years: 1960s–1992
- Rank: Lieutenant
- Unit: Kidon
- Conflicts: Six-Day War
- Other work: Commander of Kidon unit

Giora Tzahor (Hebrew: גיורא צחור; 27 October 1941 – 16 July 2012) was an Israeli military and Mossad officer, known for having headed Israel's efforts to abduct Mordechai Vanunu.

== Biography ==
George Weiss (later Giora Tzahor) was born in Saint-Étienne, France, to a Jewish family during World War II. During the German occupation of France, he was hidden and raised in a monastery. At age 17, he visited Israel and made aliyah on his own a year later. On 16 July 2012, Tzahor was killed in a traffic accident while riding his mountain bike in central Israel. He was rushed to Hillel Yaffe Medical Center in Hadera, where efforts to save him failed.

== Military and intelligence career ==
He joined the Armored Corps of the Israel Defense Forces. He became a tank commander, and completed an officers' course. He reached the rank of Lieutenant, and became the deputy commander of Battalion 46.

During the Six-Day War, his tank unit came across Jordanian tanks in Nablus. Although outnumbered, his unit destroyed seven Jordanian tanks. Tzahor was severely injured in the battle, suffering burns across his body. Doctors did not expect him to survive his injuries. However, he recovered, and six years later, he was awarded the Medal of Valor.

In 1968, Tzahor was recruited into Mossad, Israel's foreign intelligence services, and was one of the founders of Mossad's Kidon ("spear") unit, which conducts assassinations overseas. He took part in dozens of Mossad operations. In the late 1970s, was appointed deputy director of the Kidon unit, and became its commander in 1984.

In 1986, Tzahor was in charge of Mossad's operation to bring Mordechai Vanunu back from London to face justice in Israel. Vanunu, a former Israeli nuclear technician at the Negev Nuclear Research Center, had left Israel and leaked secrets about Israel's nuclear program to the British media. Vanunu was successfully abducted after being lured to Rome and was smuggled to Israel by sea. He was tortured, tried, convicted, and sentenced to 18 years in prison.

Tzahor retired from Mossad in 1992, and in 1993 was awarded a medal for his service by Mossad Director-General Shabtai Shavit.
