= Wendy Robbins =

British radio and television presenter and producer

Wendy Robbins (born 30 October 1963 in Bromley, Kent) is a British radio and television presenter and producer. She presents The House I Grew Up In broadcast on BBC Radio 4 and reports for The One Show on BBC One.

== Career ==
Prior to her career as a presenter, she was a journalist for The Sunday Times, and was one of the reporters who worked with Mordechai Vanunu, the Israeli nuclear technician kidnapped by Mossad for revealing Israel's nuclear secrets to The Sunday Times. She was portrayed by the actress Celia Meiras in Nuclear Secrets – Vanunu and the Bomb, which chronicled the Vanunu affair, shown on BBC Television in 2007.

Robbins has worked for the BBC on the current affairs programmes Panorama, Newsnight, Breakfast Time, Correspondent, Public Eye, Here And Now and Watchdog. For BBC Radio she has presented From Our Own Correspondent, File on 4, Taking Note, Violent Britain and Five Live's Breakfast Show as well as Jewish London on GLR. In 2010, she presented a two part "personal journey" on modern antisemitism in Europe for the Heart and Soul programme on BBC World Service.

Robbins has also presented France Inside Out for BBC Two's Learning Zone and What's The Story? on Channel Five as well as BBC London News and the regional programmes First Sight in London and Spotlight in Northern Ireland. On the day Diana, Princess of Wales died in 1997, she reported for BBC Television and took part in the subsequent funeral coverage. Since 2007 she has presented BBC Radio 4's The House I Grew Up In, and since October 2010 has presented reports for The One Show on BBC One.

She has been Executive Producer for numerous BBC programmes including Casualty 1907 and Everest ER and for the independent production company CTVC. She presented Bosnia's War Babies on the BBC World Service and was Executive Producer for Too Old To Be A Mum? on BBC One in 2010 and My Big Gay Jewish Conversion on BBC One in 2017.

== Personal life ==
Robbins lives in north-west London with her partner, the journalist/presenter of BBC Panorama John Ware, and three children. She is Jewish.
