= Yael Lotan (writer) =

Israeli author and activist (1935–2009)

- יעל לוטן
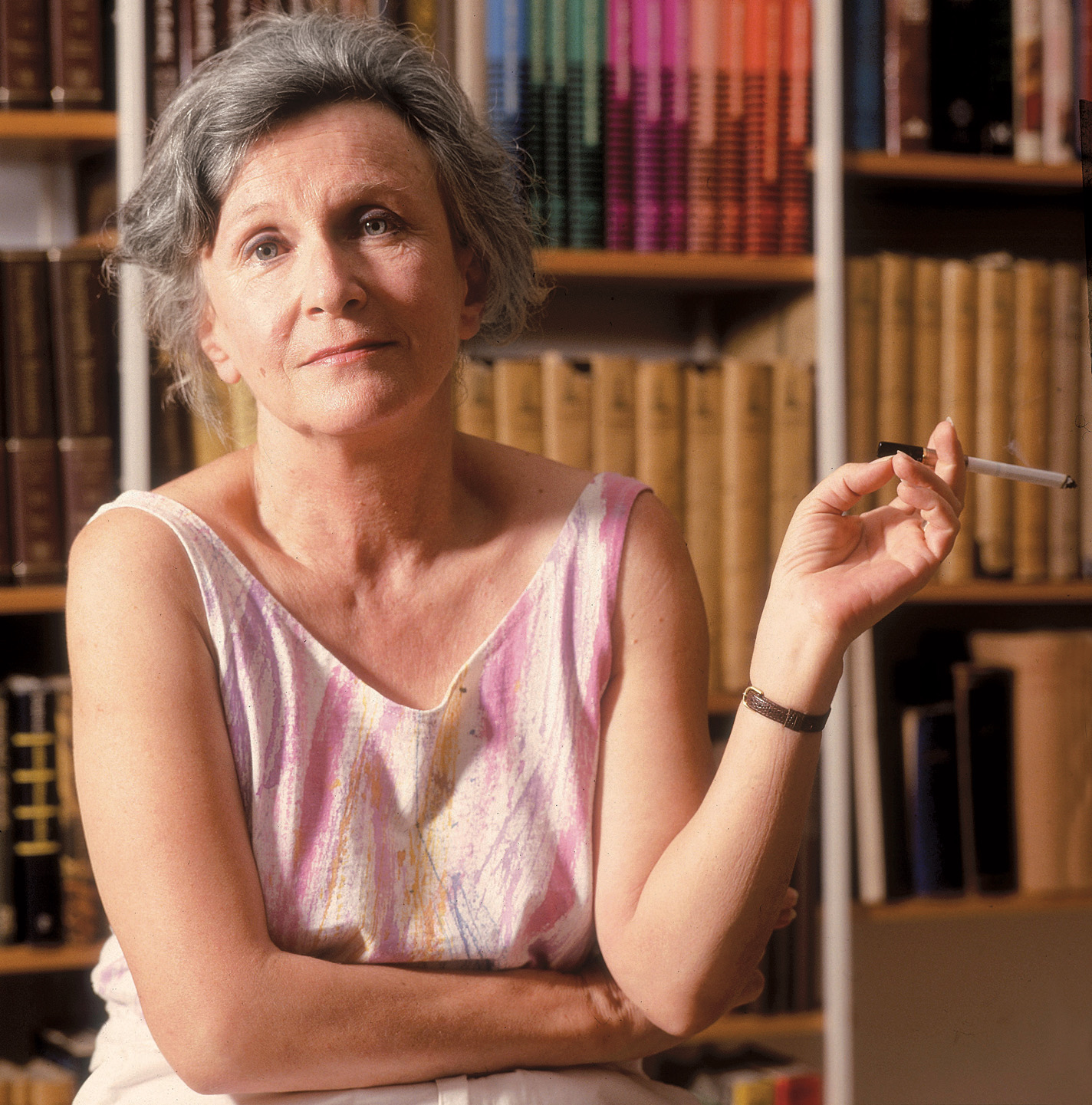
- Born: 11 September 1935; Tel Aviv, Mandatory Palestine
- Died: 2 November 2009 (aged 74); Givatayim, Israel
- Occupations: Translator; journalist; activist; editor
- Years active: 1960–2009
- Children: 2
- Parent: Binyamin Eliav

Yael Lotan (Hebrew: יעל לוטן; 11 September 1935 – 2 November 2009) was an Israeli journalist, editor, translator, peace and human rights activist.

== Biography ==
Lotan was born in Mandatory Palestine in 1935, the daughter of Dr. Binyamin Eliav né Lubotzky (1909, Riga – July 30, 1974, Petah Tikva), an Israeli journalist and diplomat, a member of the Revisionist Zionism movement and editor of the "HaMashkif" newspaper, who became a member of the social democratic Mapai party, just before the state was founded. She traveled with her parents to Argentina on a mission from the Ministry of Foreign Affairs in 1953. A year later she went to study in London and lived in Golders Green, where she married Maurice Stoppi, a Jewish-English engineer.

In 1958, she moved with her husband to Jamaica. In 1960 she published her first book, The Other Eye, a novel written in English, and published in London by Peter Davies publishing.

In 1965, she divorced Stoppi and moved to the United States, where she married Loyle Hairston, an African-American writer, a founding member of Harlem Writers Guild, and an activist.

In 1970, she returned to Israel with her two children. She edited the quarterly for art, literature and science, "Ariel", which was the Ministry of Foreign Affairs' information quarterly. At the end of 1979, it was decided not to renew her employment contract after she published a poem by Mahmoud Darwish. She went on to edit New Outlook: Middle East Monthly, a Tel Aviv-based publication devoted to Israeli and Middle Eastern affairs and the promotion of Israeli-Palestinian dialogue and peace. In the 1980s, she edited the literary supplement of the newspaper "Al HaMishmar" and the literary pages of the weekly Koteret Rashit.

In 1981, she published the story of the life of Amos Orion, who was convicted in the 1960s for murder although he proclaimed his innocence throughout his trial and imprisonment, and was pardoned in 1980. He was murdered within months of his release, and the circumstances of his murder were widely publicized. She began writing the book before his murder in July 1980.

On November 6, 1986, Lotan met in Romania, as part of a delegation of about 20 people, with Palestine Liberation Organization members, and as a result was prosecuted, about a year later, along with Reuven Kaminer, Latif Dori and Eliezer Feiler, for violating the so-called "Meetings Law", which banned contact between Israelis and representatives of a "terrorist organization". The Ramla Magistrate's Court sentenced them to 18 months in prison, of which six months in practice. After hearing the sentence they stated that: "We did not expect such a punishment, this is a draconian verdict. We have never harmed state security. We have tried to promote peace and we're treated like criminals. We did not break the law, but held talks for the advancement of peace". Their appeal to the district court on the conviction and sentence was rejected, but on appeal to the Supreme Court, their sentence was reduced to a fine of NIS 1,000 each.

From 1989 to 1993 she lived in London, writing and translating in Hebrew and English. Since 1994, she was a regular contributor to the Palestine–Israel Journal.

Lotan was active in the "Campaign to Free Vanunu and for a Nuclear-free Middle East". and assisted Mordechai Vanunu after his release from prison. On May 22, 2004, she conducted an interview with Vanunu for the Sunday Times and the BBC, to legally circumvent Vanunu's restrictions on speaking to foreign journalists.

However, a few days later, the Shin Bet arrested the British journalist Peter Hounam, a reporter for the Sunday Times, and detained at the Ben-Gurion Airport a reporter for the BBC, Chris Mitchell, who made the film about Vanunu and confiscated the recordings.

Lotan translated fiction and non-fiction from Hebrew into English, including the works of Shlomo Sand, Alona Kimchi, Sami Michael, Dorit Rabinyan, and Gershon Shaked. Her translations from English to Hebrew are the books of Patricia Cornwall and Aldous Huxley.

She died of liver cancer on November 2, 2009, aged 74, in Givatayim, Israel.

== Published works ==
=== Books ===
- The Other Eye, London: Peter Davies publishing, 1960
- Phaedra, New York: Bantam, 1962
- Mangrove town, Garden City, N.Y.: Doubleday, 1964
- No Peace Yet, London: Halban, 1991
- Avishag, Toby Press, 2002

=== Selected articles ===
- Yael Lotan, No Peace Yet, Ariel: The Israel Review of Arts and Letters – Vol. 102, 1996
- Yael Lotan, The Vanunu Campaign and Its Lessons, Antiwar.com, April 29, 2004
- Lotan, Yael. "Israel at 50: Zionism's cultural 'revolution.'." Race and Class, vol. 40, no. 1, 1998, p. 71
