= Gideon Spiro =

Israeli journalist (1935–2025)

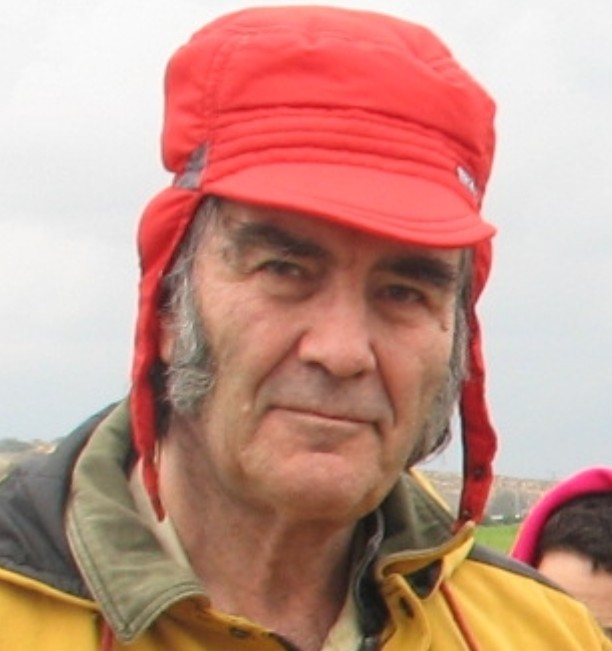
Spiro in 2008

Ralph Gideon-Yaakov Spiro (Hebrew: גדעון ספירו; 8 September 1935 – 28 January 2025) was an Israeli journalist and left-wing activist. A survivor of the November 1938 Kristallnacht pogrom in Berlin, he was a senior campaigner for human rights, prominently involved in public acts against the distribution of weapons of mass destruction in the Middle East. Throughout his career, Spiro served several notable Israeli newspapers as a columnist and reporter and published an independent political blog.

== Early life ==
Spiro was born in Berlin at the time of Nuremberg Laws. His father, Dr. Samuel Spiro, was removed from his job as a physician along with all other Jewish doctors, and settled in Jerusalem, Mandatory Palestine in 1938. About half a year later, in March 1939, he was joined by his photographer wife, Grete Lina Spiro, and their two children, Gideon and his younger brother John Gabriel. The family lived in the Jerusalem neighbourhood of Kiryat Shmuel, which is between Katamon and Rehavia. Gideon’s father was employed as the chief doctor of Youth Aliyah, and after the Holocaust he treated the children of refugees from Germany and the children in Displaced Persons’ camps in Cyprus, as well as the Children of Tehran (a group of Jewish refugee children who escaped from Poland to Palestine via Tehran). Gideon was a graduate of the Hashomer Hatzair youth movement and the network of informal relations between teachers and students that he observed at a summer work camp on a kibbutz made a profound impression on him. He asked his father for permission to spend his secondary school years on the kibbutz, and in 1951 he moved to Kibbutz Merhavia, where he was influenced as a youth by the principles of equality and social justice. Three years later he was conscripted into the IDF and volunteered to join the paratrooper corps, and took part in the reprisal actions of the 1950s and in the jump at the Mitla Pass in the Sinai War of 1956.

== Career ==
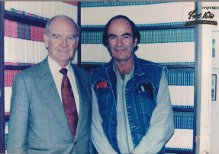
Gideon Spiro in Washington with Senator George McGovern, 23 March 1993

In the early 1960s Spiro held various positions in the public service, and in 1962 he visited East Germany. His impressions from that trip were published in the Mapam party quarterly, Ba-Sha'ar. A year later he began to work as a Knesset correspondent for the daily business newspaper Sha'ar, and then he transferred to the Mapam daily Al HaMishmar as a business correspondent. In 1966 he received a grant from the Goethe Institute to study in West Germany, where he also worked as a political correspondent for Al HaMishmar. When the Six-Day War broke out he returned to Israel and participated in the occupation of East Jerusalem as a reservist. That experience caused him to decide never to return as a soldier to occupied territories inhabited by civilian populations. He returned for a short while to Europe on a journalistic assignment, and wrote from Czechoslovakia where he had travelled on a visa that he had received before the breaking of relations between the Eastern Bloc states and Israel. He was then assigned to New York, where he served as a correspondent at the United Nations and the United States where he covered the discussions over Resolution 242, among other things. He was also part of Prime Minister Levi Eshkol’s entourage on a visit to the US and Canada and covered the 1968 Summer Olympics in Mexico City. The IDF’s occupation of the West Bank and Gaza Strip in 1967 caused Spiro to question his Zionist outlook, and while in America he was impressed and influenced by the activities of the protest movement of American youth against the Vietnam War, including actions such as the burning of draft cards, the slogan “Hell no, we won’t go!” and the October 1967 “March on the Pentagon” at which tens of thousands of demonstrators surrounded the Pentagon, facing armed soldiers.

During those years Spiro was a member of a group that wanted to found a Hebrew magazine along the lines of and under the inspiration of Der Spiegel, where he was a guest journalist for a few months. Other members of that group included the well-known Israeli journalist and author Amos Oz and Nathan Yellin-Mor, a former leader of the right-wing armed organization Lehi, which fought against the British occupation, who was a member of Israel’s first Knesset and who subsequently moved to the Left politically.

In 1970 Spiro enrolled as a student in the political science department at the University of Haifa, where he fanned the flames of political activism and was one of the founders of a joint Jewish-Arab student organization. He was one of the founders of the Yesh bloc, a federation of left-wing student groups - encompassing kibbutzniks, Mizrahim and South Americans - who were joined by Arab students led by Adel Manna (later a prominent historian and the director of the Centre for the Study of Arab Society in Israel at the Van Leer Institute in Jerusalem) and Issam Makhoul (later a Member of the Knesset and the General Secretary of the Israeli Communist Party). Spiro was elected editor of the student newspaper, which he replaced with a new publication called Post-Mortem, which dealt with social, economic and political matters and which published several scoops and exposés about the university. The newspaper’s subversive character, Spiro’s regular columns in it and the fact that Arab students were invited to contribute to it on an equal basis upset the rector of the university, Benjamin Akzin, and subsequently the political establishment in Jerusalem as well, headed by Golda Meir. Spiro drafted the outlines of the Yesh platform, which included explicit opposition to the Israeli occupation of the West Bank and Gaza Strip, Sinai and the Golan Heights. He met with Günter Grass, Herbert Marcuse and others, and came into conflict with the administration of the university. In one of his columns he criticized Israel’s rejection of a peace proposal from Egyptian president Sadat and indirectly predicted the approaching war. A few months later he published an article under the headline “Take from the Occupation and annexation budget, give to the education budget”, which became a popular slogan that appears on manifestos of the Israeli Left to this very day. On the occasion of the national students’ strike of 1972 he coined the slogan “Transfer the billions from the Territories and corruption to education, housing and raising the living standard of the marginalized”. After the decisive victory won by his faction in the election for the presidency of the students’ union at the University of Haifa the party machines in the city, both Labor and Gahal (a coalition of the Liberal Party and the Herut Party, led by Herut’s Menachem Begin), were mobilized in a joint effort to bring down the group. During this period Spiro achieved renown in the press for urging Jews and Arabs to jointly resist the dominant agenda. He stressed in interviews that “I am a socialist Zionist”, and was given the right to publish articles of reply in the press.

At the end of those three years Spiro became the editor of T’chelet-Adom (Blue-Red), the organ of the movement that later became the radical Moked party of which he was one of the founders. Among others were linguist Rubik Rosenthal (later a noted journalist at the mainstream daily Maariv), Niva Lanir (later a journalist at left-leaning daily Haaretz) and Menachem Brinker (Israel Prize laureate professor of philosophy and Hebrew literature at the Hebrew University of Jerusalem) wrote for the publication. Anticipating the possibility that he might be forced to make his living outside Israel as a political refugee, Spiro registered in the post-BA Certificate Programme in Tourism and Hotel Management at Haifa University (in affiliation with Cornell University). Two years later he returned to Jerusalem, where he received a senior appointment as a manager of the Department for Guests and Tourists in the Ministry of Education, a position he held, at intervals, for ten years. Before that he also managed to stay for ten days as a correspondent for the left-wing weekly HaOlam HaZeh on board Abie Nathan’s “peace boat” on its way to Port Said on the second anniversary of the 1973 Yom Kippur War, with the objective of giving 100,000 flowers to the Egyptian people. After the “Revolution of 1977”, when the Likud was elected to power under Menachem Begin, Spiro became the coordinator for counseling in the Educational Television in Tel Aviv. After Israel invaded Lebanon in 1982 he became one of the founders of Yesh Gvul, an organization of reservists who announced to the government that they would have no part in what they saw as an unjust war. He published strongly worded letters and articles in which he expressed harsh criticism of Begin, Sharon and Eitan – the latter two being former commanders of his from his army days – and called for the three of them to be put on trial for war crimes. That led to a disciplinary hearing under the rule that a civil servant should not publicly criticize the government’s policies. The case lasted for three years at the end of which Spiro was dismissed from his job and he was stripped of his pension and other benefits. After an appeal at the Supreme Court his pension was restored to him. Spiro was the first Israeli civil servant to be disciplined under that rule.

Before that, while he was still working at the Education Ministry, he served as editor of the daily newspaper Yom-Yom, a position he was forced to leave after a series of run-ins, the main ones of which were caused by an article criticizing Israel’s relations with Apartheid South Africa, and a few days afterwards a headline that exposed shortcomings of Bank Hapoalim, one of the newspaper’s advertisers. Until 1980 he wrote a regular column in the daily Yedioth Ahronoth, and between 1981 and 1983 in BaMerhav, under the editor Haim Baram. In 1984 he was the spokesman of the Committee of Solidarity with Bir Zeit University which came into existence after the closure of that Palestinian institution near Ramallah by the military government. In December of that year Maariv published the article by Yehoshua Bitzur, “The strange case of Gideon Spiro”, which represented Spiro in a bizarre light as a person who accepted all the positions of the PLO. Spiro filed a lawsuit against the newspaper for defamation, which he won in three courts consecutively (the Magistrates’ Court, the District Court and the Supreme Court). In 1985, along with Faisal Husseini, he was one of the founders of the Committee against the Iron Fist, which was the first joint Palestinian-Israeli organization. Spiro and Husseini were the organizations’ spokesmen. In September of that year he prepared leaflets that he handed to soldiers who were serving in the West Bank, calling on them to consider requesting a transfer to within the Green Line. Spiro was the coordinator of the World Disarmament Commission of the World Government of World Citizens, appointed by the World Coordinator, Garry Davis.

== Post- Education ministry ==
In 1986 Spiro was invited to give a series of talks in the United States as a guest of the US Palestine Human Rights Campaign, led by the Rev. Donald Wagner. In 1993 and 1997 he again traveled to the US for that purpose, those times at the invitation of the American Friends Service Committee (the Quakers). Between 1986 and 1988 he published a weekly column in Al Hamishmar. In January 1989 he was questioned by the police after he distributed to soldiers enlisting in the army the alternative “service booklet”, with Yesh Gvul, to convince them to refuse to serve in the Occupied Territories. In July of that year the weekend supplement in Haaretz ran a long interview Spiro conducted with Hilde Schramm, daughter of former Nazi architect and Minister Albert Speer. In 1989 and 1990 he was one of the columnists for the Friday supplement of the now-defunct Histadrut daily newspaper Davar and wrote a regular column in the Haredi weekly newspaper Yom Hashishi, entitled “A Fearless Secularist” (“Hiloni lo hared”), after an alliance was forged between him and the Haredim based on their shared opposition to military service for reasons of religion and conscience. That alliance came into being after one Saturday in January 1989 Spiro received a visit at his home from two police officers who invited him to report to the police station for questioning over the alternative “service booklet” he had distributed to soldiers. Spiro documented that incident in a letter he sent all the Members of the Knesset from religious factions, who then embarrassed Police Minister Haim Bar-Lev with questions in the Knesset about why the police had violated the Sabbath over such a patently non-urgent matter. Between 1989 and 1992 he also worked for the German-Jewish monthly Semit, for which among other things he did an interview with Prof. Yeshayahu Leibowitz, and in 1994, at the time of the Oslo Accords, he wrote for Yom Le-Yom, the newspaper of the Shas Party. Between 1995 and 2000 he published two weekly columns – political and economic – in the local newspaper Yerushalayim. He was dismissed in 2000 after one of his columns was published on a full page in the national newspaper Haaretz (a competitor to Yedioth Ahronoth, of which Spiro’s employer Yerusalayim was a subsidiary), in which he spoke out against the campaign by the publisher, Arnon (“Noni”) Mozes to break the union of Yedioth Ahronoth’s striking press employees. Mozes’ campaign had included breaking the strike by mobilizing journalists and other employees of Yedioth Ahronoth and local newspapers owned by the Yedioth Ahronoth Group and the use of goons and dogs to attack striking workers. In the Haaretz article Spiro wrote that "There is something fundamentally screwed up with the reporters from Yedioth and from the chain of local papers who, to our shame, mobilized to break the strikers." Spiro then went over to Maariv and began to write the "Red Rag" column in the Maariv-affiliated local newspaper Kol Ha-Zman. After a year and a half he was dismissed following complaints to the editors from readers about the anti-settler views expressed in his columns. Since then, Spiro’s columns have been published only on the Internet.

The issue of weapons of mass destruction in the Middle East came to occupy a more central position in Spiro’s activism. He has participated and lectured in many international gatherings on behalf of the "Israeli Committee for a Middle East Free from Atomic, Biological and Chemical Weapons", and was one of the few main consistent supporters of Mordechai Vanunu. He criticized the bombing of the nuclear reactor in Iraq (for which he was subjected to an internal disciplinary trial as state employee) and called for breaking the taboo around the issue of Israel’s nuclear policy, an appeal that he consistently reiterated in his columns.

During the first two decades of the 21st century, Spiro wrote regular columns in the Internet sites Indymedia, the Left Bank, Occupation Magazine (the “Red Rag” column in Hebrew and English) and in the right-wing website Eretz Hatzvi, along with guest articles in international fora. In June 2011 the police arrested him for several hours on suspicion of incitement in an article that he had published in September of the year before and which had been interpreted as a call for attacks on settlers, even though the article was in fact a call for non-violent resistance. The arrest was harshly criticized by human-rights organizations including Amnesty International, the Association for Civil Rights in Israel and Physicians for Human Rights.

== Letters to judges ==
In 1985 Spiro took up the practice of sending letters to judges and politicians, a practice he continued throughout his life. It started over the affair of the murder of Danny Katz (8 December 1983). Spiro was convinced that the trial of the five Israeli Arab defendants was defective due to a bias caused by two factors: the intense public pressure that was applied on the court, and the fact that the judges were not independent of the political system and the “occupation establishment”. He wrote a series of emphatic letters to the judges of the defendants for which he was put on trial for attempting to exercise “inappropriate influence on the course of a judicial proceeding”. Since then he has not hesitated to send strongly worded letters to judges he perceives as being racist and supporting violations of human rights.

After he was again taken in for questioning in 1995, a judge in the Magistrates’ Court in Jerusalem issued an order barring Spiro from sending further letters to judges. The newspaper Kol Ha-’Ir of the Schocken group (Haaretz) then proposed to Spiro that the forbidden letters be henceforth published on its pages. From that point, ironically, he made a more widespread impact than before. Meanwhile, the lawyer Dan Yakir, the judicial advisor of the Association for Civil Rights, conducted a campaign to overturn the injunction, which was overturned by the District Court soon afterwards, and Spiro went back to sending letters to judges directly.

== Personal life and death ==
In 1968, Spiro married an American citizen in the United States, and they were divorced a year and a half later. In 1977, back in Jerusalem, he married Miri, and the two of them had a daughter and a son.

After decades in Jerusalem, Spiro relocated to Tel Aviv in 2004. He died there on 28 January 2025, at the age of 89.
