= Lucy Liemann =

British actress (born 1973)

- Born: Lucy Katherine Liemann; 24 November 1973 (age 52); Barnet, England
- Occupation: Actress
- Years active: 2005–present
- Height: 1.70 m (5 ft 7 in)
- Spouse: Nigel Harman
- Children: 1

Lucy Katherine Liemann Harman (born 24 November 1973) is an English actress. After graduation she was spotted at a supermarket by a voice scout who urged her to become a voice artist. Liemann then went on to study acting at the Academy of Live and Recorded Arts. She has worked in theatre, television and film.

Starting in stage productions, she starred in the initial London production of Carl Djerassi's play Phallacy in 2005.

After a series of roles in various standard British television shows, including The Bill and Agatha Christie's Poirot, she played the part of Lucy in the third part of the Jason Bourne film series, The Bourne Ultimatum.

Liemann played recurring character Sam Phillips in the television series Moving Wallpaper, and stars as Reggie Perrin's nubile colleague Jasmine Strauss in the BBC's 2009–10 version of the series.

== Filmography ==
- 2005 – Footballers' Wives: Extra Time, Penny Harcourt, Episode 1.3
- 2005 – The Bill, Ruth Coyne, TV Series, Episode: "373:Torn"
- 2005, 2008 – Agatha Christie's Poirot, Miss Burgess, "Cards on the Table" (2005), Sonia, "Third Girl" (2008)
- 2006 – The IT Crowd, Julie, TV Series, Episode: "The Haunting of Bill Crouse"
- 2006 – Are You Ready for Love, Rachel
- 2006 – Private Life, Ruth Ackroyd
- 2007 – Nuclear Secrets, Janet Chisholm
- 2007 – Wild at Heart, Gloria, TV Series, Episode 2.7
- 2007 – The Bourne Ultimatum, Lucy
- 2007 – Rob Newman's History of the World... Backwards, Episode #1.3, Duchess of Padua
- 2008 – MindFlesh, Tessa
- 2008 – Moving Wallpaper, Sam Phillips, TV Series, 18 episodes, 2008–2009)
- 2009 – Reggie Perrin, Jasmine, TV Series, 12 episodes
- 2009 – Hotel Babylon, Charlotte Newhouse Episode #4.7
- 2010–14 – Rev, Ellie Pattman, TV Series, 14 episodes
- 2011 – Lewis, Bethan Vickery, TV Series, Episode: "The Mind Has Mountains"
- 2011 – New Tricks, Anna King, TV Series, Episode: "Lost in Translation"
- 2013 – Midsomer Murders, Beatrix Ordish, TV Series, Episode: "Schooled in Murder"
- 2014 – Moving On, Samantha, Episode: "Madge"
- 2014 – Agatha Raisin and the Quiche of Death, Sarah
- 2015 – Inspector George Gently, Rose Dixon, TV Series, Episode: "Gently with the Women"
- 2016 – HIM, Beth, 3 episodes
- 2016–present – Agatha Raisin, Sarah Bloxby, TV Series
