= Avigdor Feldman =

Israeli civil rights lawyer

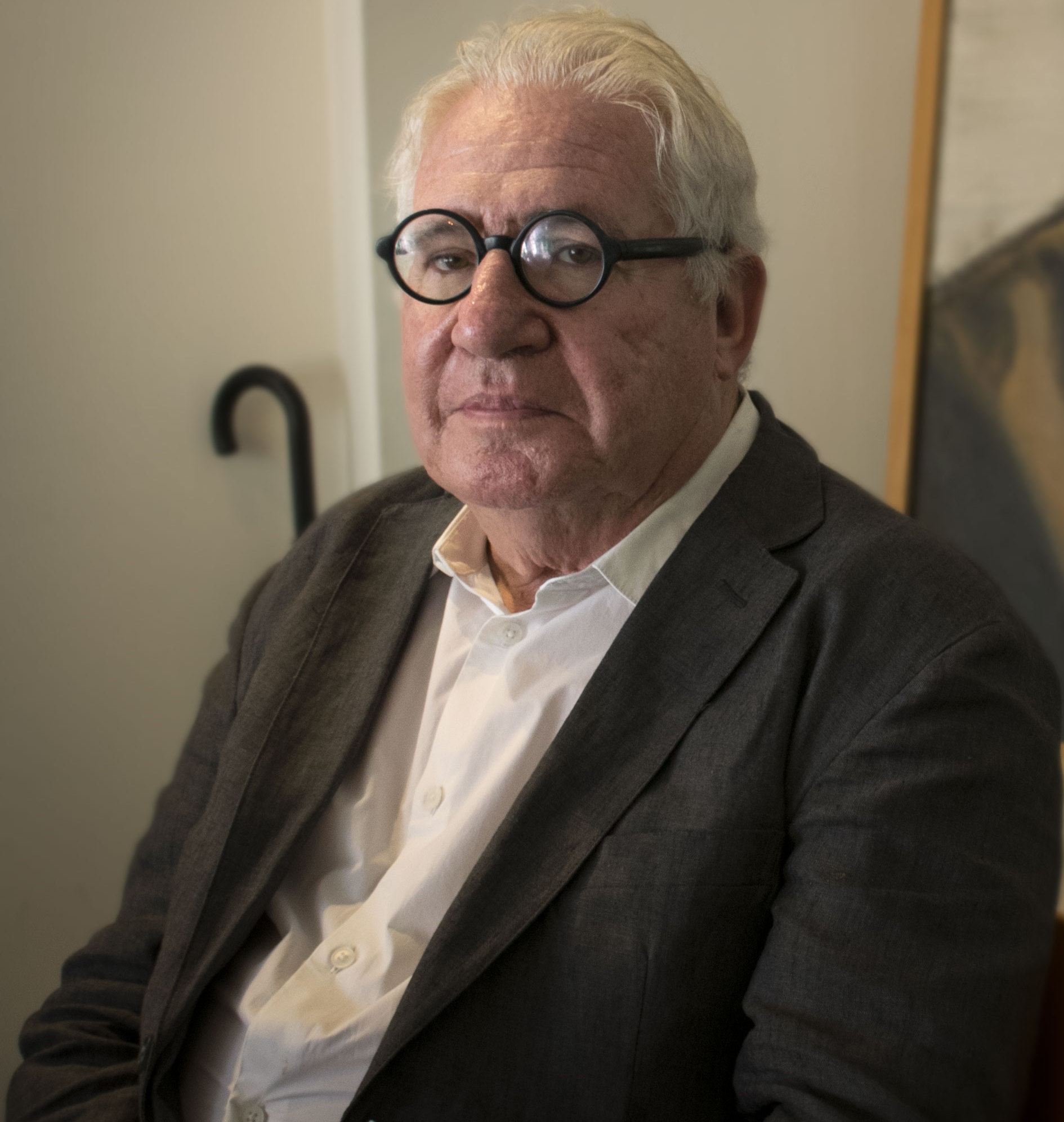
Feldman in 2015

Avigdor Feldman (Hebrew: אביגדור פלדמן; born 7 July 1948), is a civil and human rights lawyer in Israel.

== Early life and education ==
Feldman was born in Tel Aviv in 1948 to parents who were Holocaust survivors. His brother, Hanan Peled, is a screenwriter and playwright. In his youth, he studied at a religious school but eventually turned his back on religion. He did not complete high school but later completed an external matriculation certificate. He then studied law at Tel Aviv University, and after completing his studies, worked for the lawyer Amnon Zichroni. He was certified as a lawyer in 1974. He then studied at American University and received a master's degree in civil rights in 1985.

Feldman is the founder of the Association for Civil Rights in Israel (ACRI) as well as a founding member of B'Tselem.

== Career ==
He has appeared before the bench in many of the significant petitions presented to the Israeli High Court of Justice (Bagatz) regarding the settlements. He has also represented Mordechai Vanunu and the family of Tom Hurndall. In another notable case he acted as the advocate in a joint petition to the Israeli High Court of Justice by Director Mohammad Bakri and Indymedia Israel over the censorship of Bakri's film "Jenin, Jenin".

== Cases ==
Mordechai Vanunu is a former Israeli nuclear technical assistant who revealed details of Israel's nuclear weapons program to the British press in 1986. He was charged with treason and espionage. Feldman represented him at the trial where he was convicted and sentenced to 18 years in prison. Feldman subsequently represented him in several related cases, including his appeal of his conviction to the Israeli Supreme Court (denied); an appeal to be released from solitary confinement (denied); a parole request after serving 2/3 of his term (denied); a request to relinquish his Israeli citizenship (denied); and numerous arrests and charges brought against him for violating the terms of his release from prison.

In the Tom Hurndall case, a 23-year-old British volunteer for the International Solidarity Movement who was shot and killed by an Israel Defense Forces sniper, Feldman represented Hurndall's brother in an appeal to allow him to enter Israel.

== Award ==
In 1991 Feldman received the Robert F. Kennedy Human Rights Award. An annual award given to an individual whose courageous activism is at the heart of the human rights movement and in the spirit of Robert F. Kennedy's vision and legacy.

== Quotes ==
- "The fighting in Gaza was too reminiscent of Bosnia. People there were tried for shooting at civilians, schools and UN facilities after that, so the concerns are justified."
- "Every Israeli involved in the Gaza campaign is subject to prosecution anywhere in the world. There is no immunity in cases of war crimes."

== See also ==
- Attorney Michael Sfard
- Attorney Talia Sasson
