= The House I Grew Up In =

BBC Radio series

- Genre: Factual
- Running time: 28 minutes
- Country of origin: United Kingdom
- Language(s): English
- Home station: BBC Radio 4
- Hosted by: Wendy Robbins
- Produced by: Rosamund Jones
- Original release: 6 August 2007 – 25 August 2011
- No. of series: 5
- No. of episodes: 25
- Website: The House I Grew up In
- Podcast: The House I Grew up In

The House I Grew Up In is a BBC Radio series. The first episode of the first series was broadcast on 6 August 2007 on BBC Radio 4. With the presenter Wendy Robbins, each week an influential Briton explains some of their thoughts and memories as he or she goes back to the locality and the house (or houses) in which he or she was brought up. In July 2011, BBC Radio 4 began publishing a podcast featuring highlights of previous programmes, as well as the 2011 series.

== Episodes ==
=== Series 1 (2007) ===
Four episodes:

1. Peter Hennessy, 6 August
2. Jacqueline Gold, 13 August
3. Ian Paisley Jr, 20 August
4. Jackie Kay, 27 August

=== Series 2 (2008) ===
Six episodes:

1. Sir Tom Farmer, 6 August
2. Professor Mona Siddiqui, 13 August
3. David Blunkett, 20 August
4. Joanna Briscoe, 27 August
5. Shaun Bailey, 3 September
6. Baroness Warnock, 17 September

=== Series 3 (2009) ===
Five episodes:

1. Baroness Campbell, 1 September
2. Professor Steve Jones, 8 September
3. Erin Pizzey, 15 September
4. Kwame Kwei-Armah, 22 September
5. Jonathan Aitken, 29 September

=== Series 4 (2010) ===
Six episodes:

1. Peter Hitchens, 19 July
2. Colin Blakemore, 26 July
3. Julia Hobsbawm, 2 August
4. Kay Mellor, 9 August
5. Sir William Atkinson, 16 August
6. Emma Harrison, 23 August

=== Series 5 (2011) ===
Four episodes:

1. Shirley Williams, 4 August
2. Terry Waite, 11 August
3. Jasvinder Sanghera, 18 August
4. Toby Young, 25 August
