= Janet Chisholm =

- Born: Janet Anne Deane; 6 May 1929; Kasauli, India
- Died: 23 July 2004 (aged 75)
- Education: Queen Anne's School; Grenoble University
- Occupation: Intelligence agent
- Spouse: Ruari Chisholm
- Children: Two sons and two daughters

Janet Chisholm (6 May 1929 – 23 July 2004), born Janet Anne Deane, was a British MI6 agent during the Cold War.

== Early life ==
She was born in Kasauli, India to a Royal Engineers officer. She was educated Queen Anne's School, Caversham, in Berkshire, where she learnt Russian. She then studied French at Grenoble University. After school, she worked in London as a secretary before joining the Allied Control Commission and moving to West Germany. There she met her future husband, Ruari Chisholm, and began working for British Intelligence.

Her husband was a spy who headed the MI6 station in Moscow but worked under the guise of a visa officer. When Oleg Penkovsky offered Soviet military secrets to MI6, she became the go-between. Outwardly, Janet was an ordinary mother of four children. She would meet Penkovsky in a local park and he would offer what was said to be vitamin c supplements for the children, but were actually disguised documents containing military secrets about the Soviet nuclear weapons arsenal.

Their cover was eventually blown by another British agent, George Blake, who defected to the Soviets. Penkovsky was quickly arrested and later executed, while the Chisholms were deported. Controversy surrounds Penkovsky's death, with many believing that MI6 put him in danger after Blake confessed all to the Soviet officials. For their part, MI6 maintained that he insisted on continuing to feed the British information even after his life was threatened.

The Chisholms went on to work in Singapore and twice in South Africa until Ruari's retirement. He had planned to write a memoir but died of malaria before he could begin. Janet continued to travel around the world until well into her 70s. She refused to talk about her experiences in Russia and took all of the secrets she learned to the grave.

== Portrayal in popular culture ==
Chisholm was portrayed by Lucy Liemann in the 2007 BBC Television docudrama Nuclear Secrets. The programme included covert KGB photographs showing Janet Chisholm meeting Oleg Penkovsky.
