= Shimon Peres Negev Nuclear Research Center =

Israeli research center

Coordinates: 31.0013°N 35.1445°E

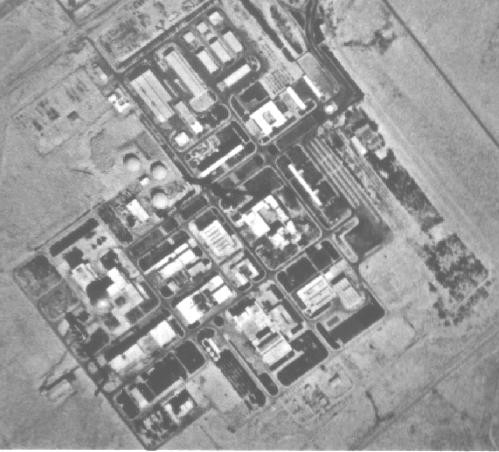
The Shimon Peres Negev Nuclear Research Center satellite image, 1971

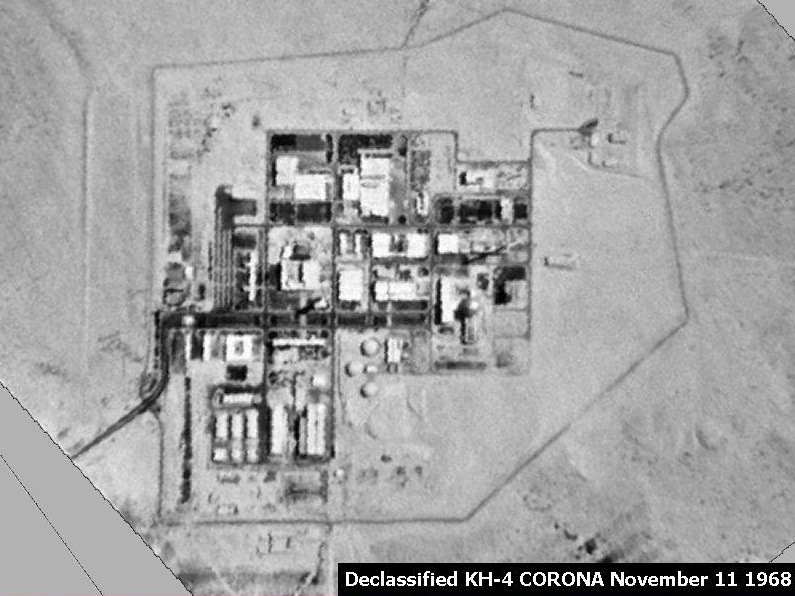
The Shimon Peres Negev Nuclear Research Center as viewed from a Corona satellite in the late 1960s

The Shimon Peres Negev Nuclear Research Center (Hebrew: קריה למחקר גרעיני – נגב ע"ש שמעון פרס, formerly the Negev Nuclear Research Center, sometimes unofficially referred to as the Dimona reactor) is an Israeli nuclear installation located in the Negev desert, about thirteen kilometers (eight miles) south-east of the city of Dimona. It is central to the Israeli nuclear weapons program. Construction began in 1958 and its heavy-water nuclear reactor became active sometime between 1962 and 1964.

Israel claims that the nuclear reactor and research facility are for general "research purposes into atomic science", but the reactor has been involved in the production of plutonium and other nuclear materials for Israel's nuclear weapons. The reactor is not a civil power plant and does not send electricity to the Israeli grid.

Israel reportedly opened Dimona to U.S. inspection in January 1965, with inspections continuing until 1969. The airspace over the Dimona facility is closed to all aircraft, and the area around it is heavily guarded and fenced off. During the Six-Day War, an Israeli missile shot down an Israeli Air Force Dassault Ouragan fighter that inadvertently flew over Dimona. In August 2018, it was renamed after the late president and prime minister of Israel Shimon Peres. In March 2026, the U.S. conducted strikes on the Natanz Nuclear Facility using bunker buster bombs to target the site during the 2026 Iran war. In response, Iran struck Dimona, injuring at least 47 people. Iran said that it targeted the Dimona facility.

Israel is believed to have produced its first nuclear weapons by 1967, and it has been estimated to possess anywhere between 80 and 400 nuclear weapons. Information about the facility remains highly classified and the country maintains a policy known as strategic ambiguity—refusing either to confirm or deny their possession. Israel currently is a non-signatory to the Treaty on the Non-Proliferation of Nuclear Weapons.

== History ==
=== Construction ===
Facility construction started in 1958, with French assistance according to the Protocol of Sèvres agreements. The complex was constructed in secret, and outside the International Atomic Energy Agency inspection regime. To maintain secrecy, French customs officials were told that the largest of the reactor components, such as the reactor tank, were part of a desalination plant bound for Latin America. Estimates of the cost of construction vary; the only reliable figure is from Shimon Peres himself, who wrote in his 1995 memoir that he and David Ben-Gurion collected US$40 million, "half the price of a reactor ... [from] Israel's friends around the world." Based on this, it can be surmised a construction cost figure of around US$80 million or likely close to a billion dollars in 2023, adjusted for inflation.

The Dimona reactor became active (critical) sometime between 1962 and 1964, and with the plutonium produced there, the Israel Defense Forces most likely had their first nuclear weapons ready before the Six-Day War.

In 2021, it was reported that based on satellite imagery, the complex was undergoing a major expansion. The new construction was estimated to have started in late 2018 or early 2019, of size 140 metres by 50 metres in the immediate vicinity of the nuclear reactor and reprocessing plant.

=== Inspections ===
When the United States intelligence community discovered the purpose of the site in the early 1960s, the U.S. government requested that Israel agree to international inspections. Israel agreed, but on the condition that inspectors from the U.S., rather than the International Atomic Energy Agency, be used, and that Israel would receive advance notice of all inspections. According to declassified Johnson Administration documents, Israel opened Dimona to U.S. inspection in January 1965.

It has been asserted that because Israel knew the schedule of the inspectors' visits, it was able to hide the clandestine manufacture of nuclear weapons, thereby deceiving the inspectors, by installing temporary false walls and other devices before each inspection. The inspectors eventually informed the U.S. government that their inspections were useless, due to Israeli restrictions on what areas of the facility they could inspect. By 1969 the U.S. believed that Israel might have a nuclear weapon, and terminated inspections that year.

=== Reported facility airspace incursions ===
The reactor complex was reportedly overflown by unidentified jet aircraft prior to the Six-Day War in 1967. At the time the aircraft involved were thought to be Egyptian Air Force MiG-21s, although a controversial 2007 book argues that they were actually reconnaissance Soviet MiG-25s. During the same war an Israeli fighter jet, damaged in a bombing raid over Jordan, was shot down by air defenses protecting the facility after straying over it, killing the pilot, Captain Yoram Harpaz.

=== Nuclear weapons production ===
The full-scale production of nuclear warheads is believed to have commenced by 1966, with the Israel Defense Forces believed to be in possession of up to 13 operational nuclear warheads by 1967.

=== Mordechai Vanunu revelations ===
Vanunu's photograph of a Negev Nuclear Research Center glove box containing nuclear materials in a model bomb assembly, one of about 60 photographs he later gave to the British press

In 1986, Mordechai Vanunu, a former technician at Dimona, fled to the United Kingdom and revealed to the media details of Israel's nuclear weapons program. He went on to explain the purposes of each building, also revealing a top-secret underground facility directly below the installation. The Mossad, Israel's secret service, sent an agent named Cheryl Bentov (née Hanin) who lured Vanunu to Italy, where he was arrested by Mossad agents and smuggled to Israel aboard a freighter. An Israeli court then tried him in secret on charges of treason and espionage, and sentenced him to eighteen years imprisonment. At the time of Vanunu's arrest, The Times reported that Israel had material for approximately 20 hydrogen bombs and 200 fission bombs by 1986. In early 2004, Vanunu was released from prison, and placed under several strict restrictions, such as the denial of a passport, freedom of movement limitations and restrictions on communications with the press. Since his release, he has been rearrested and charged multiple times for violations of the terms of his release.

=== Safety concerns ===
Safety concerns about the 55+ year-old reactor have been reported. In 2004, as a preventive measure, Israeli authorities distributed potassium iodide tablets to thousands of residents living nearby, in case of a release of radioactive iodine-131.

=== Reported attacks ===
In January 2012, media reports indicated that the Israel Atomic Energy Commission had decided to temporarily shut down the reactor, citing the site's vulnerability to attack from Iran as the main reason for the decision. In October and November 2012, it was reported that Hamas had fired rockets at Dimona and/or Negev Nuclear Research Center. In July 2014 Hamas again fired rockets towards the area surrounding the reactor. The facility was not damaged in any of the attempted strikes. In April 2021 a Syrian surface-to-air missile landed in the vicinity of the place.

=== Declassified documents ===
In April 2016 the U.S. National Security Archive declassified numerous documents from 1960 to 1970, which detail American intelligence opinions relating to Israel's attempts to obfuscate the purpose and details of its nuclear program. American officials involved in discussions with then Prime Minister David Ben-Gurion and other Israeli officials believed the country was providing "untruthful cover" about intentions to build nuclear weapons.

=== 2026 Iran war ===
In March 2026, the U.S. conducted strikes on the Natanz Nuclear Facility using bunker buster bombs to target the site during the 2026 Iran war. In response, Iran struck Dimona, injuring at least 47 people. Iran said that it targeted the Dimona facility.

== See also ==
- IAEA safeguards
- Israel and weapons of mass destruction
- Nuclear weapons of Israel
- Nuclear proliferation
- Soreq Nuclear Research Center
- Dimona Radar Facility
