= Reggie Perrin =

British TV sitcom (2009–2010)

- Title screen
- Genre: Sitcom
- Written by: David Nobbs; Simon Nye
- Directed by: Tristram Shapeero
- Starring: Martin Clunes; Fay Ripley; Wendy Craig; Geoffrey Whitehead; Neil Stuke; Lucy Liemann
- Composers: Ronnie Hazelhurst; Jonathan Whitehead; Mark Thomas
- Country of origin: United Kingdom
- Original language: English
- No. of series: 2
- No. of episodes: 12

Production
- Producers: Charlie Hanson; Ben Farrell
- Production locations: Teddington Studios, London, England.
- Running time: 30 minutes

Original release
- Network: BBC One; BBC HD
- Release: 24 April 2009 – 18 November 2010

Related
- The Fall and Rise of Reginald Perrin

Reggie Perrin is a modern update of the 1970s BBC sitcom The Fall and Rise of Reginald Perrin, which starred Leonard Rossiter. The revival stars Martin Clunes and was first broadcast on 24 April 2009. Series 1 was released on DVD in Region 2 by 2entertain on 1 June 2009. The second series was released on 22 November 2010.

== Development ==
On 14 January 2009, it was announced by the BBC that Martin Clunes would star in a contemporary version of the sitcom, taking the title role of Reggie. The remake was commissioned by Jay Hunt, controller of BBC1, and Cheryl Taylor, controller of BBC Comedy. Clunes was joined in the cast by Fay Ripley, Wendy Craig, Geoffrey Whitehead, Neil Stuke, Kerry Howard, Jim Howick, Lucy Liemann and Nick Mohammed. The new version was written by Simon Nye and the original creator of the Reggie character, David Nobbs, who had authored four Reginald Perrin novels as well as the original version of the sitcom.

The first series of the Reggie Perrin revival was broadcast on BBC One, as well as in high definition on BBC HD. Despite disappointing viewing figures for its first series, BBC1 Controller Jay Hunt announced in February 2010 that a second series had been commissioned. Studio segments began filming at Teddington Studios on 2 April, scheduled to run to 7 May. It began airing on 14 October 2010.

== Plot ==
Reginald Perrin is a middle-aged project executive for "Groomtech", a manufacturer of grooming products, where he is in charge of disposable razors. Although secure in his marriage, with a paid-for house, no children, a car and a comfortable living, he is dissatisfied with the grind of modern living—such as his daily commute by train, often overcrowded and "27 minutes late" due to a plethora of reasons—and undergoing a mid-life crisis, keeping himself entertained by fantasies. At work, he has to contend with a dim secretary, two fawning but ambitious junior executives, and an overbearing boss, Chris Jackson. Lacking attention from his wife, Nicola, he finds a fantasy distraction in his colleague, Jasmine Strauss. The plot of series one roughly parallels the storyline of the original, however the new series diverges when Reggie decides to fake his own suicide.

== Episodes ==
=== Series 1 ===
#	Description	Original air date	Viewers (millions)
1	Reggie's train journey to work is always delayed by 27 minutes, for a variety of reasons, and his fellow-passengers appear immersed in themselves. He walks daily past "Sunshine Desserts" and into "Groomtech". There he is a product executive in charge of disposable razors supported by a dim secretary, two fawning but ambitious junior executives, and an overbearing boss, Chris Jackson. However, his life is enlightened when he meets the new executive in charge of balms and lubricants, Jasmine Strauss, and he tries to get closer to her. Tasked with creating a new product based on pumice, normally used as an exfoliant, he comes up with the idea of the "DRR"—a Disposable Razor Raft, to be used in the bath, but is met with bemusement.	24 April 2009	5.39
2	Reggie decides not to take his briefcase to work, not that it ever contained anything, and his train is delayed again. Chris Jackson is concerned about the absence of briefcase and accuses Reggie of being a maverick. Meanwhile, Reggie is still besotted with Jasmine and suddenly kisses her, only to be rebuffed. At home, Reggie prepares a special breakfast for his wife, only to have it interrupted by the arrival of her hungry father.	1 May 2009	4.41
3	Reggie considers becoming a school teacher and tries his hand at the school at which his wife teaches; this works out so well that he invites the class to visit his office, which (contrary to protocol) he has filled with plants. The class visit is a disaster, but Reggie gets a free 1st class train ticket for complaining.	8 May 2009	3.84 (overnight)
4	Chris Jackson decides that globalisation is the way forward for Groomtech, and is persuaded by Reggie that Finland is a good indicator of market trends; Reggie visits Helsinki with Jasmine to try and sell their products, and after an alcohol-fuelled evening, they nearly end up together—until Chris unexpectedly shows up. Meanwhile, Reggie's wife is tempted by his former best man.	15 May 2009	4.11
5	Reggie becomes fully tired of the daily 11-minute delay of his commute and opts to travel to work by bicycle instead. At the same time Chris requests his coaching for a critical business meeting and his wife withholds sex. The situation escalates as Reggie faces constant injuries on his new commute, his wife reacts negatively to his attempts to be wholly honest and Chris takes complete credit for Reggie's problem solving.	22 May 2009	4.16
6	The office party does not go with the expected swing. Chris, deciding to fight Reggie's stress with more stress, has tasked Reggie with presenting a keynote speech at short notice. Reggie instead takes the opportunity to vent his frustration at how pointless his life has been before being thrown out. He leaves for the seaside and contemplates whether or not he should simply walk into the ocean.	29 May 2009	2.46 (overnight)

=== Series 2 ===
#	Description	Original air date	Viewers (millions)
1	Reggie decides against his pseudocide, and instead chooses to leave his job and pursue a more fulfilling career. Meanwhile, Nicola loses her job as a teacher after pulling down a boy's trousers. Groomtech is in serious trouble without Reggie, forcing Chris to appeal him to return, which Reggie arrogantly brushes off.	14 October 2010	3.21 (overnight)
2	Reggie struggles to find a new career, and tries running a stalls at the farmers market selling homemade bread, however with finances tight, Reggie is forced to return to Groomtech. As it turns out, Chris has been sacked, and the company's chairman decides to take a risk on Reggie and appoint him branch manager.	21 October 2010	2.755 (overnight)
3	Determining "not to lose touch with reality", Reggie makes sweeping changes at Groomtech, banning ties and introducing the wearing of slippers, a tea-lady and a bouncy castle to bounce ideas around in. He also gives strangers lifts in his company car. When the chairman expresses disapproval Reggie changes the firm's name to Grot, and announces that it will make only useless things. Nicola, now sacked, is bored at home, spending her time mending basket chairs, whilst her father tells Reggie he has cold feet about marrying his mother.	28 October 2010	2.86
4	The staff express doubts as to the viability of Reggie selling his 'Grot' products—and indeed as to his sanity—but the goods fly off the shelves. The Groomtech chairman, hugely impressed, gives Reggie his next assignment: to cut half the staff. Nicola, feeling neglected as Reggie embraces his work with great enthusiasm, initially turns down David after he makes a pass at her at the swimming baths but still ends up ringing him. William, desperate to avoid matrimony, tries a feeble ploy to persuade Marion that he is gay, though it of course fails to work.	4 November 2010	3.0
5	The success of the new product range leaves Reggie with a difficult decision, which could result in redundancy for many of his colleagues. Meanwhile, his efforts to reconcile with Nicola lead to a shocking discovery that threatens to change everything.	11 November 2010	3.47
6	Nicola's affair with David is now out in the open, and the Perrins clash at their parents' wedding. Reggie needs to come up with a plan to stop the chairman of Groomtech from selling the company and making anyone redundant. The company is ultimately sold, but without any job losses—although Reggie is retained as an ideas man and Chris is reappointed manager. Nicola makes an earnest attempt at reconciliation. Reggie begins to wonder if he should just disappear once again.	18 November 2010	2.75

== Reception ==
John Preston of The Daily Telegraph was negative, describing it as "hopelessly wheezy and club-footed. Part of the problem was that while the script may have been updated, everything else had large tufts of mammoth hair stuck to it: the cheap sets, the laboured direction, the glaringly unatmospheric lighting, the once-daring surrealistic touches, even the concept itself."

Caitlin Moran of The Times was more positive, saying "I actually like this new one. It gently warmed me. It warmed me as As Time Goes By warms me" and praising Clunes's interpretation: "I engage with the escalating depression and insanity of Clunes's Perrin more than I did with Rossiter's..."
