= Peter Hounam =

British journalist (born 1944)

Peter Metcalfe Hounam (born 1944) is a British journalist who has worked for Sunday Times, Daily Mirror, the London Evening Standard, and BBC Television, as well as having published several books. In 1996, Hounam founded Vision Paperbacks, of which he is the chairman.

== Bibliography ==
- Secret Cult, with Andrew Hogg, about the School of Economic Science, ISBN 0-85648-837-2
- The Mini-Nuke Conspiracy: How Mandela Inherited a Nuclear Nightmare about nuclear weapons in South Africa, Viking (1 October 1995) ISBN 0-670-86925-2 (with Steve McQuillan)
- Who Killed Diana? with Derek McAdam, 1998, ISBN 1-901250-17-2
- Operation Cyanide: Why the Bombing of the USS Liberty Nearly Caused World War III, (2003) suggesting that USS Liberty attack by Israel, with the connivance of President Johnson (USA), was to be blamed on Egypt, to justify attacking that country. ISBN 978-1-904132-19-6.
- The Woman from Mossad: The Torment of Mordechai Vanunu. ISBN 1-58394-005-7 paperback edition title: The Woman from Mossad: The Story of Mordechai Vanunu & the Israeli Nuclear Program

== Mordechai Vanunu Case ==
He is most famous for his role in the case of Mordechai Vanunu, Israeli nuclear technician who revealed Israel's secret nuclear bomb programme. Hounam's interview with Vanunu appeared in the Sunday Times in 1986.

In April 2004, Hounam traveled to Israel for Vanunu's release from prison on 21 April 2004. Vanunu had spent 18 years in Israeli jails, following his abduction from England (via Italy) by the Mossad in 1986.

== USS Liberty incident ==
Hounam helped produce the 2002 BBC documentary Dead in the Water, which delves into the background of the 1967 Israeli attack on the USS Liberty. The documentary suggests that the attack was a deliberately-staged false flag operation meant to catapult the United States into the ongoing Six-Day War on Israel’s side by sinking the Liberty and blaming the attack on Egypt. Interviews include former U.S. Secretary of Defense Robert McNamara, former CIA Director Richard Helms, former head of the Israeli Navy Admiral Shlomo Errell, and many USS Liberty survivors, including Captain William L. McGonagle.

Hounam continued to research the USS Liberty incident, which culminated in the 2003 publishing of the book Operation Cyanide: Why the Bombing of the USS Liberty Nearly Caused World War III, which expands on the false flag theory.

Hounam also appeared in the 2020 docuseries Sacrificing Liberty, produced by TruNews, which features extensive interviews from USS Liberty survivors.

== Arrest in Jerusalem ==
At 9.30pm on 26 May 2004, while working on a BBC documentary about Vanunu, Hounam was taken from his hotel in Jerusalem by five plainclothes Shin Bet officers, reportedly for having contact with Vanunu, who is not allowed to see foreigners. Before being taken, Hounam was able to inform an Amnesty International activist of his arrest, but did not get access to a lawyer.

On 27 May 2004, the Jerusalem District Court imposed a gag order, preventing further details of the arrest from becoming known. Hounam was scheduled to make a court appearance, as the security services request permission from the courts to continue holding him.

Reportedly, on 22 May 2004, Vanunu was secretly interviewed for The Sunday Times, by Yael Lotan, an Israeli journalist. Her two-hour interview was videotaped by an Israeli television crew. Hounam apparently knew of the interview, and was planning to use portions of it in his documentary. He had been on his way to meet Lotan when he was arrested.

Hounam's wife, Hilarie, disputed the allegations that her husband violated the conditions placed upon Vanunu's release. Speaking from the family's home in the Scottish town of Aberfeldy she said: "Peter has been absolutely scrupulous in following the letter of the regulations. He hasn't talked to him [Vanunu] since the day of his release, and everything has had to be done second- or third-hand, through his brother and through lawyers." She added: "I think the secret services can pretty much do what they like in Israel, and this is of no surprise to Peter – he's known Israel well for 18 years and has been following Vanunu's case all that time."

Hounam was detained for a day, during which the case attracted intense media coverage, and after which he was released without charge. Israeli Attorney General Menachem Mazuz ordered his release, after consulting with Shin Bet officials and representatives of the Israeli Justice Ministry. Hounam returned to the UK on 28 May 2004, and the BBC announced it would broadcast the Vanunu interview the following Sunday.
