= Frank Barnaby =

British nuclear physicist

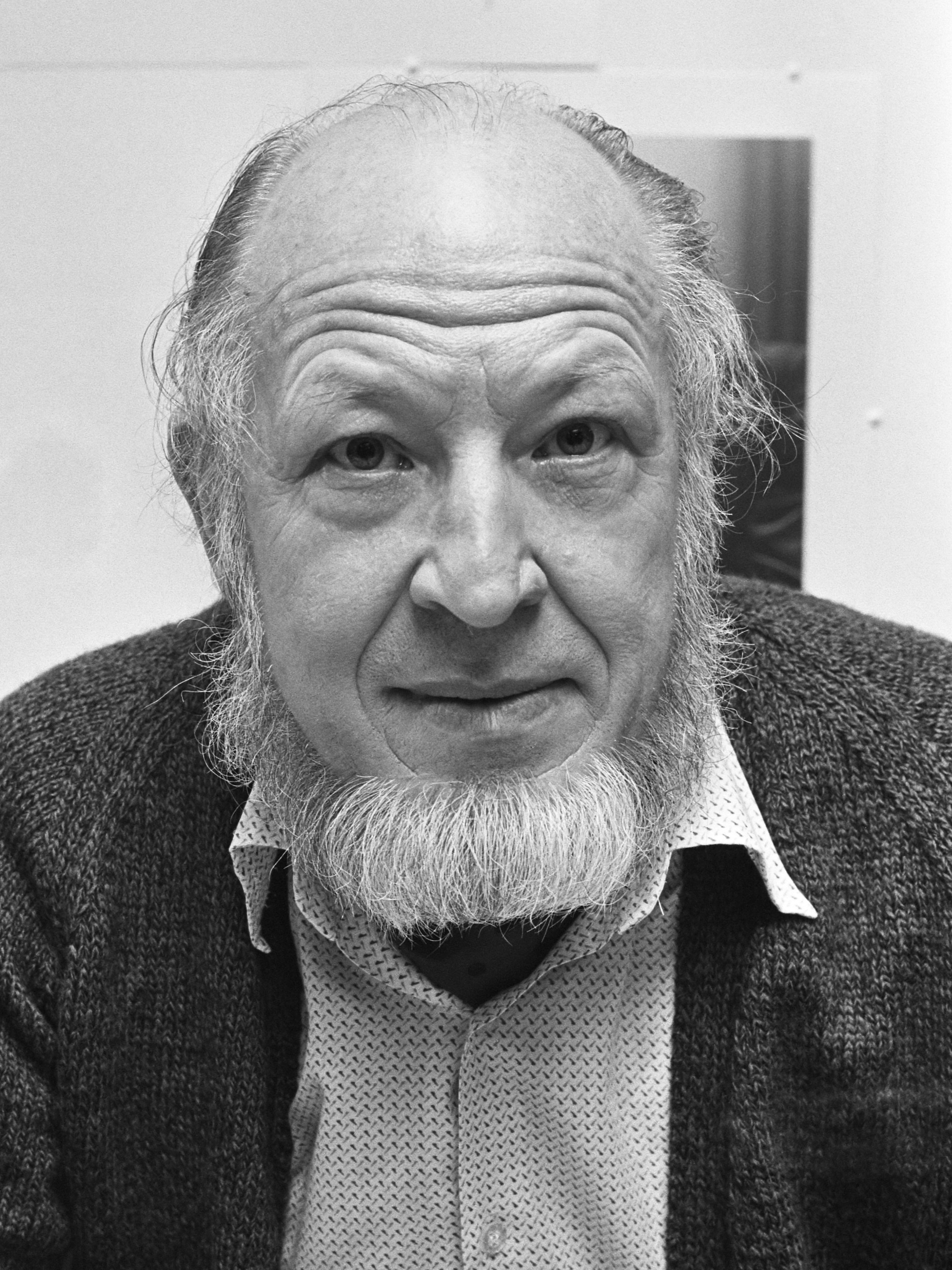
Frank Barnaby (1982)

Charles Frank Barnaby (27 September 1927 – 1 August 2020) was an English nuclear physicist who served as the Nuclear Issues Consultant to the Oxford Research Group, a freelance defence analyst, and a prolific author on military technology. He was based in the United Kingdom.

He was born in Andover, Hampshire, and was educated at Andover Grammar School and the University of London.

Barnaby trained as a nuclear physicist and worked at the Atomic Weapons Research Establishment, Aldermaston, between 1951 and 1957. He was on the senior scientific staff of the Medical Research Council (UK) when a university lecturer at University College London (1957–1967).

Barnaby was Director of the Stockholm International Peace Research Institute (SIPRI) from 1971 to 1981. In 1981, Barnaby became a founding member of the World Cultural Council. He was a professor at the VU University Amsterdam 1981–85, and awarded the Harold Stassen Chair of International Relations at the University of Minnesota in 1985. He also served as the Executive Secretary of the Pugwash Conferences on Science and World Affairs. In 1991, he received the prize "Archivio Disarmo - Golden Doves for Peace" from IRIAD.

He was married and has a son and a daughter.

He died on 1 August 2020 at the age of 92.

== Works ==
- The nuclear future (Fabian Society, 1969)
- Man and the Atom (Minerva, 1971)
- Nuclear proliferation and the South African threat (1977)
- Future Warfare (Michael Joseph, 1986)
- Star Wars (Fourth Estate, 1987)
- The Automated Battlefield (Sidgwick & Jackson, 1987)
- The Invisible Bomb (Tauris, 1989)
- The Gaia Peace Atlas (Pan, 1989)
- A Handbook of Verification Procedures (editor - Palgrave Macmillan, 1990)
- The Role and Control of Military Force in the 1990s (1992)
- How to Build a Nuclear Bomb: And Other Weapons of Mass Destruction (Granta, 2003) ISBN 978-1862076242
- The Future of Terror (Granta, 2007) ISBN 978-1862078710
- Prospects for Peace (Pergamon, 2013) ISBN 978-1483234533
- How Nuclear Weapons Spread: Nuclear-Weapon Proliferation in the 1990s (Routledge, 2016) ISBN 978-1138991774
