= Mordechai Vanunu =

Israeli activist and whistleblower (b. 1954)

- מרדכי ואנונו
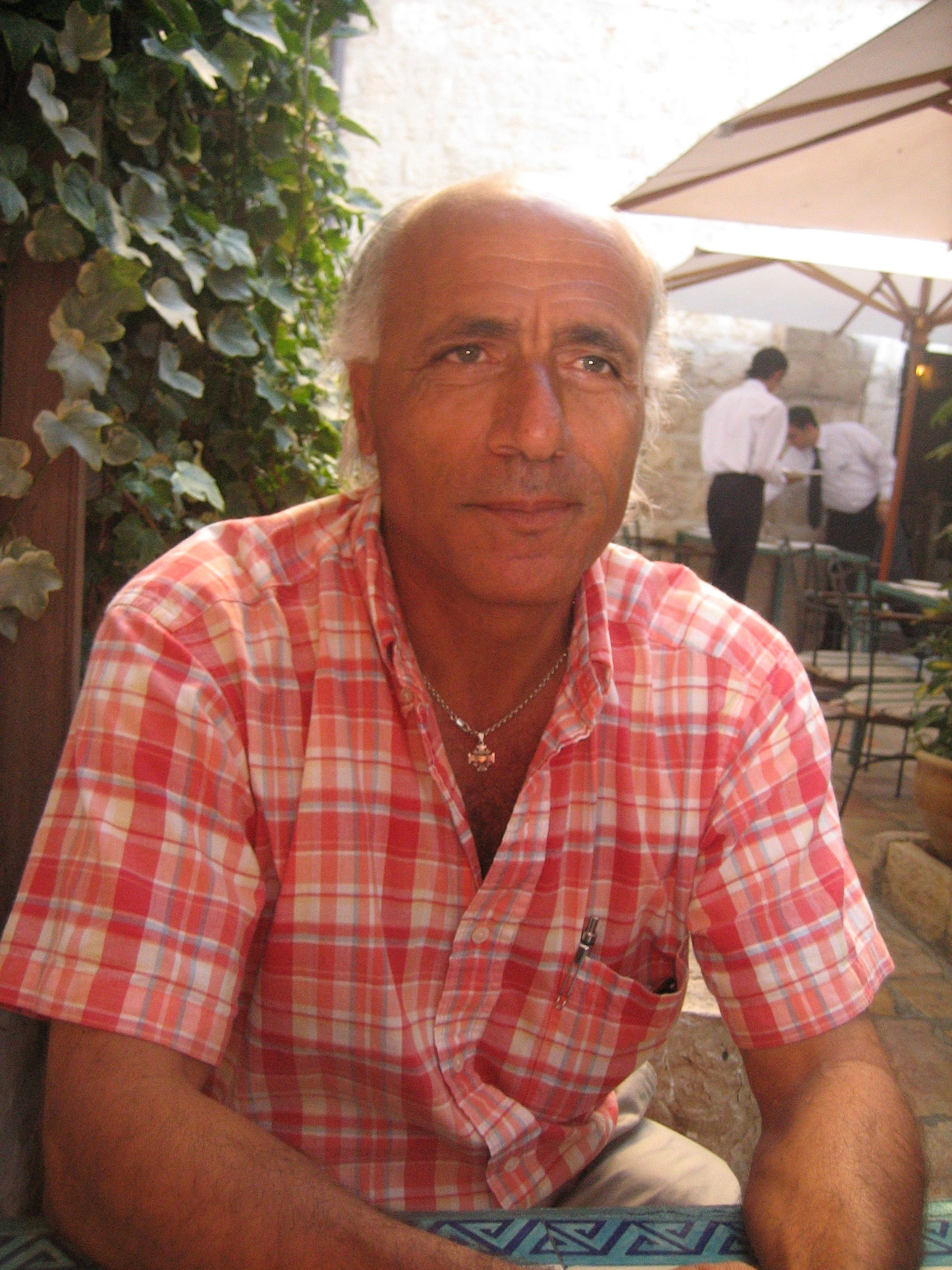
- Vanunu in 2009
- Born: 14 October 1952 (age 74); Marrakesh, Morocco
- Other name: John Crossman
- Known for: Nuclear whistleblower
- Spouse: Kristin Joachimsen (m. 2015)
- Awards: Right Livelihood Award
- Website: www.vanunu.org (archived here)

Mordechai Vanunu (Hebrew: מרדכי ואנונו; Hebrew pronunciation: [moʁdeˈχaj vaˈnunu]; Arabic: مردخاي فعنونو; Arabic pronunciation: [murdaxaj faʕnuːnu]; born 14 October 1952), also known as John Crossman, is an Israeli former nuclear technician and peace activist who, citing his opposition to weapons of mass destruction, revealed details of Israel's nuclear weapons program to the British press in 1986. He was subsequently lured from Britain to Italy by the Israeli intelligence agency Mossad, where he was drugged and abducted. He was secretly transported to Israel and ultimately convicted in a trial that was held behind closed doors.

Vanunu spent 18 years in prison, including more than 11 in solitary confinement, though this type of punishment is not prescribed anywhere in Israel's penal code, nor imposed by his verdict. Released from prison in 2004, he was further subjected to a broad array of restrictions on his speech and his movement and arrested several times for violations of his parole terms, giving interviews to foreign journalists and attempting to leave Israel. He claims to have suffered from "cruel and barbaric treatment" at the hands of prison authorities, and suggests that things would have been different if he had not converted to Christianity.

In 2007 Vanunu was sentenced to six months in prison for violating terms of his parole. The sentence was considered unusually severe even by the prosecution, who expected a suspended sentence. In response, Amnesty International issued a press release in July 2007, stating that "The organization considers Mordechai Vanunu to be a prisoner of conscience and calls for his immediate and unconditional release." In May 2010 Vanunu was arrested again and sentenced to three months in jail on a charge that he had met foreigners, in violation of conditions of his 2004 release from prison. Since his most recent release from prison, Vanunu has been banned from leaving Israel to apply for asylum and join his wife in Norway; each time the expiration date of the ban approaches it has been extended. This situation is unchanged as of 2026.

Vanunu has been characterized internationally as a whistleblower. American whistleblower Daniel Ellsberg has referred to him as "the preeminent hero of the nuclear era". In 1987, he was awarded the Right Livelihood Award for "his courage and self-sacrifice in revealing the extent of Israel's nuclear weapons program". Israel claims and regards Vanunu as a traitor.

== Early life and education ==
Vanunu was born in Marrakesh, Morocco, in 1952. He was the second of 11 children born to an Orthodox Jewish family that lived in the city's mellah, or Jewish quarter. His father, Shlomo, ran a grocery store, and his mother, Mazal, was a housewife. Vanunu studied in an Alliance française school, and a Jewish religious elementary school, or cheder. In 1963 Vanunu's father sold his business, and the family emigrated to Israel. Vanunu was ten years old at the time. The family transited through France, spending a month in a camp in Marseille before being taken to Israel by sea. Upon arrival in Israel, the family was sent by the Jewish Agency to settle at Beersheba, which at that time was an impoverished desert city. During their first year in Israel, the family lived in a small wooden hut without electricity.

Vanunu's father purchased a small grocery store in the town's market area, and the family moved into an apartment. Vanunu's father devoted his spare time to religious studies. He came to be regarded as a rabbi, earning respect in the market. Vanunu was sent to a Yeshiva Tichonit, a religious elementary school on the outskirts of town, which mixed religious and conventional studies.

After completing the 8th grade, his parents enrolled him in a yeshiva, but after three months he was withdrawn. For high school, Vanunu attended Yeshivat Ohel Shlomo high school, a Bnei Akiva-run school, where he was an excellent student, earning honors. According to Vanunu, whilst in secondary school, he had a personal crisis which led to him deciding not to observe religious Judaism. In an interview, he said that "already at this stage, I decided to cut myself off from the Jewish religion, but I didn't want to have a confrontation with my parents because I wanted to complete my studies".

He finished high school with a partial matriculation. Vanunu's parents wanted him to attend a higher yeshiva; he agreed but left after a week. He then found a temporary job in the court archives. In October 1971 he was conscripted into the Israel Defense Forces. He tried to join the Israeli Air Force as a pilot, but after having been rejected by examiners, they sent him to the Combat Engineering Corps, where he became a sapper. After basic training, he completed a junior commanders' course, then a non-commissioned officers course, and was given the rank of Sergeant-Major.

He was stationed in a highlands area and saw action during the 1973 Yom Kippur War. In 1974 he participated in the demolition of army installations in areas of the Golan that were to be returned to Syrian control. Vanunu was offered a permanent job with the army as a career soldier, but declined the offer, and was honorably discharged in 1974. He then enrolled at Tel Aviv University and entered a pre-academic course, completing his matriculation, then began studying physics. During this period he worked in a variety of places, including in a bakery and retirement home. After failing two exams at the end of his first year and realizing that the full-time work he needed to do to pay his tuition interfered with his studies, Vanunu suspended his studies and returned to his parents' home in Beersheba, where he found temporary work.

== Negev Nuclear Research Center ==
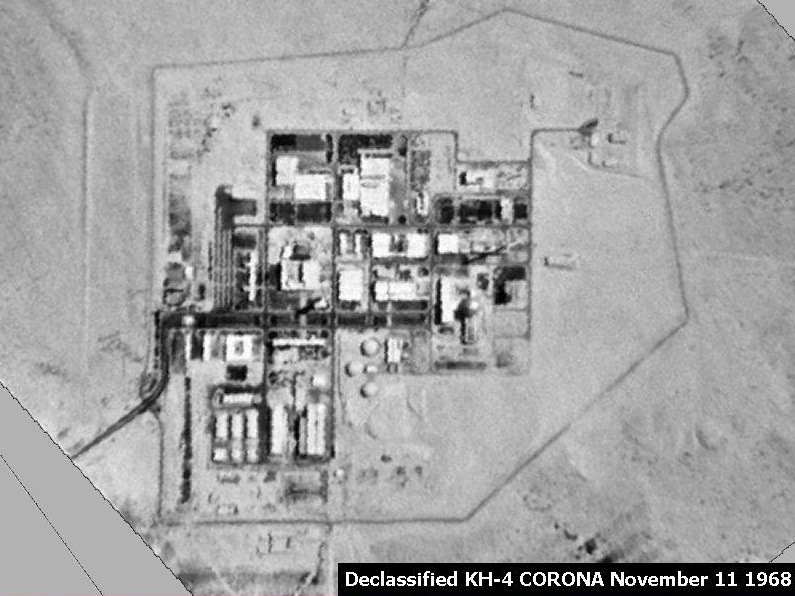
An aerial view of the Negev Nuclear Research Center in 1968

In 1976, Vanunu applied for a job at the Negev Nuclear Research Center, an Israeli facility used to develop and manufacture nuclear weapons located in the Negev Desert south of Dimona. Most worldwide intelligence agencies estimate that Israel developed nuclear weapons as early as the 1960s, but the country has intentionally maintained a "nuclear ambiguity", neither acknowledging nor denying that it possesses nuclear weapons. Vanunu had heard from a friend of his brother Meir that well-paying jobs were being advertised by the facility.

After a lengthy interview with the facility's security officer, he was accepted for training. He signed a contract forbidding disclosure of sensitive security materials and had to promise not to visit any Arab or Communist countries for five years after his employment at the facility ended. He passed health checks, after which his training began. He was put through an intensive training course in physics, chemistry, mathematics, first aid, fire drill, and English. He did sufficiently well to be accepted and was employed as a nuclear plant technician and shift manager in February 1977. Vanunu earned a high salary by Israeli standards, and lived well. His work record was so good he qualified for a car and telephone allowance, though he had no interest in either and simply had his brother Meir's car registered in his name and had the telephone installed at his parents' house.

In 1979 he enrolled at Ben-Gurion University of the Negev in Beersheba. Initially he wanted to study engineering, but within a week switched to economics, and also began a Greek philosophy course. In the autumn of 1980, he took a backpacking trip through Europe. He toured London, Amsterdam, Germany, and Scandinavia, and then visited Greece and toured the Greek islands with a Canadian friend. After returning to Israel, he bought a flat in Beersheba. In the summer of 1983 he took a three-month trip to the United States and Canada with a friend, transiting through Ireland in the process on a charter flight through Shannon Airport. This was in direct violation of instructions from his workplace, which mandated direct flights to North America only, in case of hijacking. Upon his return he was threatened with a disciplinary tribunal, but this never happened.

=== Political views and activities ===
His political views had begun to change and he became critical of many policies of the Israeli government. He opposed the 1982 Lebanon War, and when he was called up to serve in that war as a reserve soldier in the Engineering Corps, he refused to perform field tasks and instead did kitchen duty. He campaigned for equal rights for Arab Israelis. In March 1984, he formed a left-wing group called "Campus" with five Arab and four Jewish students. He became acquainted with many Arab students, including pro-PLO activists. Vanunu was also affiliated with a group called "Movement for the Advancement of Peace". He developed a particular resentment for what he viewed as the dominance of Israeli society by Ashkenazi Jews or Jews of European origin, and discrimination against Sephardi and Mizrahi Jews from the Middle East and North Africa. He felt that he was looked down on by those who ran the Dimona facility due to his Moroccan origin. According to Dr. Ze'ev Tzahor of Ben-Gurion University, "he projected a deep sense of deprivation. He assumed an Ashkenazi dominance in Israel that encompassed all social strata and an Ashkenazi consensus closing off all possibilities of advancement for Oriental Jews." According to The Jerusalem Post, Vanunu's anti-Ashkenazi feelings morphed into anti-Jewish and anti-Israeli feelings, and he became the principal advocate for Arab students on campus, arguing their case with what other Jewish students saw as irrational intensity.

In his security file at the Negev Nuclear Research Center it was noted that he had displayed "left-wing and pro-Arab beliefs". In May 1984 he was questioned by the head of security at Dimona and a lawyer who was possibly from Shin Bet, and was let off with a stern warning about divulging any unauthorised information.

In June 1984 he was again interrogated at the facility's security office. The next month, he left for France for two weeks with a student group to meet French-Jewish students in Paris and when he returned, he was interrogated again. In 1985 Vanunu reportedly joined the Israeli Communist Party. Vanunu later claimed that he had developed a very close friendship with an Israeli Arab, and after a year, discovered that his friend was being paid to spy on him.

=== Gathering evidence ===
Vanunu graduated from Ben-Gurion University in 1985 with a BA in philosophy and geography. In early 1985, he lost his job following a mass layoff of workers due to government cutbacks, but his labor union won him his job back. After he resumed working at the facility, Vanunu secretly smuggled in a camera and covertly took 57 photographs. He quit his job on 27 October 1985, due to repeated efforts by his superiors to transfer him to tasks that were less sensitive than his previous positions at the facility. He was given severance pay of $7,500 and a reference letter praising his work and describing his departure as a layoff.

On 15 April 2015 the National Security Archive of George Washington University published documents corroborating Vanunu's statements regarding the Dimona Negev Nuclear Research Center. The archived documents detail the discovery of Israel's nuclear deceptions, debates over Israel's lack of candor and efforts to pressure the Israelis to answer key questions about the Dimona facility.

== Disclosure, abduction and publication ==
After leaving his job, Vanunu started attending Israeli Communist Party meetings, but was unimpressed with the level of discussion and soon stopped going. In November 1985, he moved in with Judy Zimmet, an American midwife working at Soroka Medical Center. After accompanying Zimmet and her sister on a tour around Israel, he embarked on a backpacking trip throughout the Far East, and planned to meet her in the United States afterwards, though he later became uncertain about continuing the relationship. On 19 January 1986, he left Israel for Greece via a boat from Haifa to Athens. After spending a few days in Athens, he flew to Thailand on an Aeroflot flight to Bangkok. He transited through Moscow, spending a night at a transit hotel there. During his time in Thailand, he visited the Golden Triangle, where he tried opium and hash cocktails. He then flew to Myanmar, where he met and befriended Fiona Gall, daughter of British journalist Sandy Gall. After touring Mandalay together, Vanunu flew on his own to Nepal.

In Nepal Vanunu visited the Soviet embassy in Kathmandu to inquire about the travel documents he would need for a future trip to the Soviet Union. He then returned to Thailand, and from there went to Australia on a flight to Sydney. Vanunu decided to settle permanently in Sydney, and after ten days of sightseeing, he found a job as a dishwasher at the Menzies Hotel, and then at a Greek restaurant. Meanwhile, he studied for and eventually gained a taxi license. He began attending a church, and in July 1986, converted to Christianity, joining the Anglican Church of Australia. He moved into an apartment owned by the church and found work driving a taxi owned by a parishioner.

=== Meeting with journalists ===
While in Australia, Vanunu met Oscar Guerrero, a freelance journalist from Colombia. Guerrero persuaded Vanunu to sell his story, claiming that his story and photographs were worth up to $1 million. After failing to interest Newsweek, Guerrero approached the British Sunday Times, and within a few days, Vanunu was interviewed by Sunday Times journalist Peter Hounam. According to American journalist Louis Toscano, Guerrero approached the Israeli consulate in August 1986, offering help in tracking down an Israeli "traitor". Guerrero was hoping to be paid. He met with an Israeli intelligence officer named Avi Kliman and told him Vanunu's story. Kliman was initially dismissive but took down Vanunu's name and passport number, which was checked. They met a second time, during which Guerrero handed over four crudely copied photographs.

On 7 September 1986 two men who identified themselves as officers from Shin Bet approached Vanunu's older brother Albert in his carpentry shop in Beersheba and questioned him about his brother. They told him that Vanunu was in Australia talking to a British newspaper about his work at the nuclear research center, urged him to dissuade his brother, and then made him sign a non-disclosure agreement barring him from talking about the meeting.

On 10 September Vanunu and Hounam flew to London from Australia. There, in violation of his non-disclosure agreement, Vanunu revealed to the Sunday Times his knowledge of the Israeli nuclear programme, including the photographs he had secretly taken at the Dimona site.

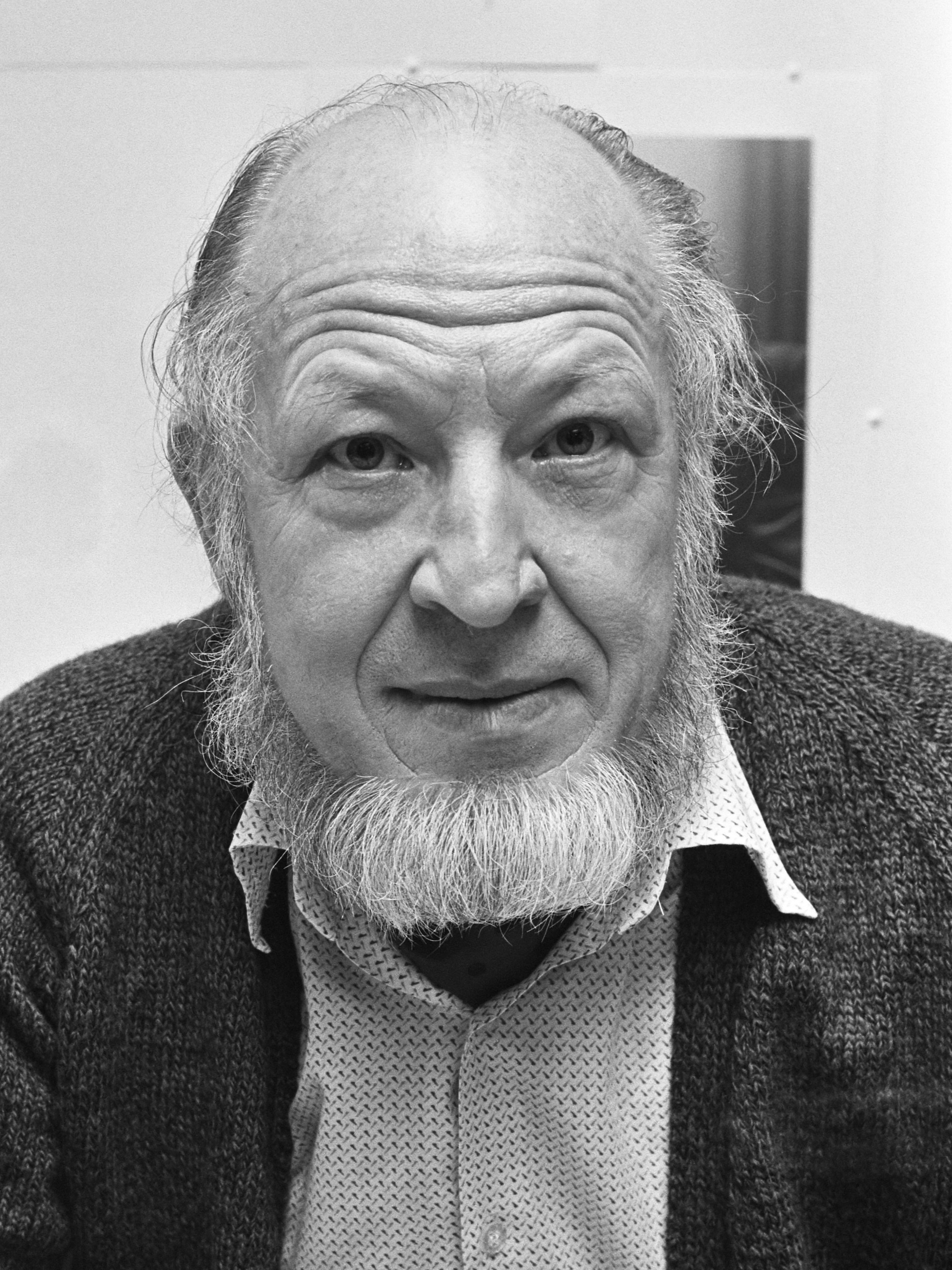
Frank Barnaby (pictured in 1982) helped verify Vanunu's story, and later testified for him as a defense witness.

The Sunday Times was wary of being duped, especially in light of the recent Hitler Diaries hoax. As a result, the newspaper insisted on verifying Vanunu's story with leading nuclear weapon experts, including former U.S. nuclear weapons designer Theodore Taylor and former British AWE engineer Frank Barnaby, who agreed that Vanunu's story was factual and correct. In addition, a reporter, Max Prangnell, was sent to Israel to find people who knew Vanunu and could verify his story. Prangnell verified Vanunu's backstory, meeting a few people at Ben-Gurion University who identified Vanunu from a photograph, as well as meeting neighbors and others who confirmed he had worked at the Dimona nuclear plant.

Vanunu gave detailed descriptions of lithium-6 separation required for the production of tritium, an essential ingredient of fusion-boosted fission bombs. While both experts concluded that Israel might be making such single-stage boosted bombs, Vanunu, whose work experience was limited to material (not component) production, gave no specific evidence that Israel was making two-stage thermonuclear bombs, such as neutron bombs. Vanunu described the plutonium processing used, giving a production rate of about 30 kg per year, and stated that Israel used about 4 kg per weapon. From this information it was possible to estimate that Israel had sufficient plutonium for about 150 nuclear weapons.

During his stay in Britain, the Sunday Times initially put Vanunu up in a hotel in London close to the newspaper's premises, but shortly afterward, he was moved to what was considered a safer location: a lodge near Welwyn, in rural Hertfordshire, which was in an obscure location and accessed by a narrow road. Hounam considered it an excellent hiding place.

During one foray into London together with a Sunday Times journalist, Vanunu encountered an Israeli friend, Yoram Bazak, and his girlfriend Dorit on Regent Street. They agreed to meet later. When they met, Bazak intensely questioned Vanunu on his views towards Israel's defense policy, and during the conversation, Vanunu told Bazak about the possibility of him publicly revealing secrets from Dimona to the British press. Bazak responded with a menacing threat.

Hounam speculated that Vanunu's meeting with Bazak was no mere coincidence and that Bazak had been recruited by Mossad in an attempt to reveal Vanunu's motives and try to dissuade him. Vanunu later grew bored of rural Hertfordshire and asked for a new location in London, and he was booked in the first hotel he had stayed in under a false name. Hounam speculated that as Oscar Guerrero, who had followed him and Vanunu to London, had already stayed there, Mossad likely had that hotel under surveillance.

Later in September, as the story neared publication, the Sunday Times approached the Israeli embassy with the story, offering it a chance to rebut the allegations. The Israeli press attache, Eviatar Manor, was twice visited by journalists to discuss the story, and on the second visit, was handed some of Vanunu's photographs. The material was rushed to Israel for review. The Israeli response denied the allegations, characterizing Vanunu as a minor technician with limited knowledge of the reactor's operations.

Vanunu states in his letters that he intended to share the money received from the newspaper (for the information) with the Anglican Church of Australia. Meanwhile, Guerrero, despite having met Hounam and Vanunu at the airport when they arrived in London and receiving assurance from Hounam that he would get his money, sold the story to the tabloid Sunday Mirror, whose owner was Robert Maxwell. In 1991, a self-described former Mossad officer or government translator named Ari Ben-Menashe claimed that Maxwell, allegedly an agent for Israeli intelligence services, had tipped off the Israeli Embassy about Vanunu in 1986. In sharing his story with the Sunday Mirror, Guerrero forfeited the agreed-upon payment of $25,000 from The Sunday Times.

=== Pursuit and capture by Israeli government ===
The Israeli government, then led by Shimon Peres, ultimately decided to abduct Vanunu and bring him to Israel to face trial. But the government was determined to avoid harming its good relationship with the British government, then led by Prime Minister Margaret Thatcher. Given that the Israeli government did not want to risk confrontation with British intelligence, it decided that the Mossad would try to secretly persuade Vanunu to leave British territory under his own volition. Israel's efforts to capture Vanunu were headed by Giora Tzahor.

Through constant surveillance and analysis by Mossad expert Freudian psychologists, it was agreed that Vanunu, though lonely and somewhat socially challenged, was still eager and fit for female companionship. Masquerading as an American tourist named "Cindy", Israeli Mossad agent Cheryl Ben Tov befriended Vanunu, and on 30 September 1986 persuaded him to fly to Rome with her on a holiday, leaving the next day. This has been portrayed as a honey trap operation, whereby an intelligence agent employs seduction to gain the target's trust—a practice which has been officially approved in Israel. Meanwhile, the Israeli Navy ship INS Noga was ordered to sail for Italy.

The Noga, disguised as a merchant ship, was fitted with electronic surveillance equipment and satellite communications gear in its superstructure, and was primarily used to intercept communications traffic in Arab ports. As the ship was heading from Antalya in Turkey back to Haifa, the captain was instructed by encrypted message to change course for Italy and anchor off the coast of La Spezia, out of the port in international waters.

Once in Rome, Vanunu and Ben Tov took a taxi to an apartment in the city's old quarter, where three waiting Mossad operatives overpowered Vanunu and injected him with a paralyzing drug. Later that night, a white van hired by the Israeli embassy arrived, and Vanunu was carried to the vehicle bound to a stretcher. The van drove with Vanunu and the agents to La Spezia's dock, where they boarded a waiting speedboat, which reached the waiting Noga anchored off the coast. The crew of the Noga were all ordered to assemble in the ship's common hall behind locked doors, as Vanunu and the Mossad agents boarded the ship, which then departed for Israel. During the journey, Vanunu was kept in a secluded cabin, with just the Mossad agents routinely interrogating and guarding him in turns, while none of the Noga's crew were allowed to approach either of them.

On 5 October, the Sunday Times published the information it had revealed, and estimated that Israel had produced more than 100 nuclear warheads.

On 7 October, the Noga anchored off the coast of Israel between Tel Aviv and Haifa, where it was met by a smaller vessel to which Vanunu was transferred. Vanunu was detained in Israel and interrogated. He was detained in a Gedera prison, in a wing run by Shin Bet.

On 9 November 1986, after weeks of press reports speculating that Vanunu had been abducted, the Israeli government confirmed it was holding him prisoner. In the press conference where Vanunu's detention was announced, a government official said: "The government would like to inform that Mordechai Vanunu is detained in Israel, by law, under a court order...". The Israeli government denied rumours that Vanunu had been kidnapped on British soil, saying that they were without foundation. The Israelis also said there had been no basis to the report that Peres contacted Thatcher in order to inform her about the abduction.

Vanunu was denied contact with the media, but as he was being transported, Vanunu held his hand against the van's window while being transported to court, with the following message inscribed on his hand for the waiting press to read.: "Vanunu M was hijacked in Rome ITL 30.9.86 21:00 came to Rome by BA fly 504", by which he meant to say: "Mordechai Vanunu was abducted in Rome, Italy, on 30 September 1986 at 21:00 after coming to Rome on British Airways flight 504". After the announcement made by the Israeli government, Italy launched an investigation into the case, with Prime Minister Bettino Craxi saying that Italy was getting no help from Israel in the investigations. Israel denied affronting Italy.

== Trial and imprisonment ==
On 6 January 1987, he began a hunger strike over his prison conditions. During a visit with his brother Asher and in a letter to his brother Meir, he complained, among other things, of being held in solitary confinement 23 hours a day. When Judy Zimmet traveled to Israel and asked to visit him in prison, prison authorities said they could only meet in the presence of prison officials and with them separated by a glass barrier. Vanunu rejected these conditions, demanding that he be allowed to meet her face to face. He filed three appeals to the Israeli Supreme Court protesting his conditions, which were rejected. After 33 days, Vanunu ended his hunger strike.

On 30 August 1987 Vanunu's trial opened. He was charged with treason, aggravated espionage, and collection of secret information with intent to impair state security. The trial, held in secret, took place in the Jerusalem District Court before Chief Justice Eliyahu Noam and Judges Zvi Tal and Shalom Brenner. Vanunu was initially represented by Amnon Zichroni, then by Avigdor Feldman, a prominent Israeli civil and human rights lawyer. The prosecutor was Uzi Hasson.

The death penalty in Israel is restricted to special circumstances, and only one execution has ever taken place there, which was Adolf Eichmann, who was executed on 1 June 1962 after being abducted from Argentina in 1960 and tried in Israel for his role in the Holocaust. In 2004, former Mossad director Shabtai Shavit told Reuters that the option of extrajudicial execution was considered in 1986, but rejected because "Jews don't do that to other Jews." Treason is a capital offense under Israeli law, and Vanunu could have faced the death penalty, but prosecutor Uzi Hasson announced that he would not seek the death penalty.

During his trial, Vanunu was brought to court wearing a motorcycle helmet to conceal his face. On 1 September 1987, while being brought into court, Vanunu tried to take off his helmet and started shouting in an apparent attempt to talk to the reporters nearby. His guards stopped him using physical force, and police sirens were turned on to drown out his voice.

Peter Hounam and Frank Barnaby both testified as defense witnesses for Vanunu. Before appearing in court, Hounam was warned that he would be arrested if he reported on the proceedings or his own testimony. He was allowed to report that he "gave evidence" regarding his "relationship" with Vanunu. On 28 March 1988, Vanunu was convicted. He was sentenced to eighteen years of imprisonment from the date of his abduction in Rome. The Israeli government refused to release the transcript of the court case until, under a threat of legal action, it agreed to let censored extracts be published in Yedioth Ahronoth, an Israeli newspaper, in late 1999.

Vanunu served his entire 18 years at Shikma Prison in Ashkelon, of which he was held 11 years in imposed solitary confinement, not imposed in Israeli criminal law, nor by any specific court instructions, to "upgrade" his prison term. On 3 May 1989, he appealed his conviction and sentence to the Israeli Supreme Court and was brought there in a closed police vehicle for an appeal hearing. In 1990, his appeal was rejected. The following year, an appeal to the Supreme Court arguing for better prison conditions was rejected. On 12 March 1998, after having spent over eleven years in solitary confinement, Vanunu was released into the general prison population.

While in prison, Vanunu took part in small acts of noncompliance, such as refusing psychiatric treatment, refusing to initiate conversations with the guards, reading only English-language newspapers rather than Hebrew ones, refusing to work, refusing to eat lunch when it was served, and watching only BBC television. "He is the most stubborn, principled and tough person I have ever met", said his lawyer, Avigdor Feldman. In 1998, Vanunu appealed to the Supreme Court for his Israeli citizenship to be revoked. The Interior Minister denied Vanunu's request on grounds that he did not have another citizenship. He was denied parole because he refused to promise that he would never speak of the Dimona facility or his kidnapping and imprisonment.

Many critics argue that Vanunu held no additional information that would pose a real security threat to Israel and that the government's only motivation is to avoid political embarrassment and financial complications for itself and allies such as the United States. By not acknowledging possession of nuclear weapons, Israel avoids a US legal prohibition on funding countries that proliferate weapons of mass destruction. Such an admission would prevent Israel from receiving over $2 billion each year in military and other aid from Washington. Ray Kidder, then a senior American nuclear scientist at Lawrence Livermore National Laboratory, has said:

On the basis of this research and my own professional experience, I am ready to challenge any official assertion that Mr. Vanunu possesses any technical nuclear information not already made public.

== Release and restrictions on his freedom ==
Vanunu was released from prison on 21 April 2004. Surrounded by dozens of journalists and flanked by two of his brothers, he held an impromptu press conference but refused to answer questions in Hebrew because of the suffering he said he sustained at the hands of the State of Israel. Vanunu said Israel's Mossad spy agency and the Shin Bet security services tried to rob him of his sanity by keeping him in solitary confinement. "You didn't succeed to break me, you didn't succeed to make me crazy," he said. Vanunu called for Israel's nuclear disarmament, and for its dismantlement as a Jewish state. Around 200 supporters and a smaller number of counter-demonstrators attended the conference. He indicated a desire to completely dissociate himself from Israel, initially refusing to speak in Hebrew, and planning to move to Europe or the United States as soon as the Israeli government would permit him to do so.

Shortly before his scheduled release, Vanunu remained defiant under interrogation by Shin Bet. In recordings of the interview made public after his release, he is heard saying "I am neither a traitor nor a spy, I only wanted the world to know what was happening." He also said, "We don't need a Jewish state. There needs to be a Palestinian state. Jews can, and have lived anywhere, so a Jewish State is not necessary." "Vanunu is a difficult and complex person. He remains stubbornly, admirably uncompromisingly true to his principles, and is willing to pay the price," said Ha'aretz newspaper in 2008.

Following his release, Vanunu moved to an apartment in Jaffa. After the address was published in the media, he decided to live in St. George's Cathedral in Jerusalem. He regularly receives visitors and sympathisers and has repeatedly defied the conditions of his release by giving interviews to foreign journalists.

A number of prohibitions were placed upon Vanunu after his release from jail and are still in force:

- He shall not leave Israel
- He shall not speak to any foreigner unless granted approval to do so by Shin Bet
- He shall not come within 500 metres (550 yd) of a border crossing or airport
- He shall not come within 90 metres (100 yd) of a foreign embassy
- His phone and Internet use shall be subject to monitoring
- He shall notify authorities of any change in his place of residence, and whom he intends to meet

== Attempted pursuit of asylum ==
On 22 April 2004 Vanunu asked the government of Norway for a Norwegian passport and asylum in the country for "humanitarian reasons", according to Norwegian media.

While the Norwegian foreigner directorate (State Department) (UDI) had been prepared to grant Vanunu asylum, it was suddenly decided that the application could not be accepted because Vanunu had applied for it from outside of the borders of Norway. An unclassified document revealed that Erna Solberg, a member of parliament and later prime minister of Norway, considered that extracting Vanunu from Israel might be seen as an action against Israel and thereby unfitting the Norwegian government's traditional role as a friend of Israel and as a political player in the Middle East. Since the information has been revealed, Solberg rejected criticism and defended her decision.

Vanunu's application for asylum in Sweden was rejected on the grounds that Sweden, like Norway, does not accept absentee asylum applications. He unsuccessfully requested asylum in Ireland, which would require him to first be allowed to leave Israel.

=== 2006 ===
In 2006 Amnesty International's British branch chief, Kate Allen, wrote that Microsoft handed over the details of Vanunu's Hotmail email account on the demand of Israeli authorities while that country investigated whether he was communicating with foreign journalists. The handover happened before a court order had been obtained.

=== 2008 ===
International calls for his freedom of movement and freedom of speech made by organizations supporting Vanunu have been either ignored or rejected by Israel. On 15 May 2008, the "Norwegian Lawyer's Petition for Vanunu" was released, signed by 24 Norwegian attorneys. It calls on the Norwegian government to urgently implement a three-point action plan "within the framework of international and Norwegian law" and allow Vanunu to travel to, live and work in Norway.

=== 2010 ===
On 11 October 2010, his appeal to rescind the restrictions and allow him to leave Israel and speak to foreigners was denied by the Israeli Supreme Court.

=== 2015 ===
In March 2015 Vanunu established an Indiegogo campaign to raise the $10,000.00 that he was ordered to pay the Israeli newspaper Yedioth Ahronoth, when Israel's Court ruled against Vanunu's libel suit against the publication for a November 1999 article. Yedioth Ahronoth's headline read: "Vanunu gave Hamas activists information on bomb assembly in prison" and a second page insert entitled, "He's done it again", claimed Vanunu sent messages containing bomb-making information to incarcerated members of Hamas. Avigdor Feldman, Vanunu's defense attorney argued the report was fabricated by Shin Bet.

On 7 May 2015 Vanunu reported the restrictions denying his right to leave Israel were renewed for the 12th year since he was released from prison.

On 19 May 2015 Vanunu married Norwegian professor Kristin Joachimsen at the Lutheran Church of the Redeemer in Jerusalem.

On 3 June 2015 Minister Vidar Helgesen said Norway had asked Israel to abolish the restrictions against Vanunu leaving Israel for humanitarian considerations. Centre Party foreign policy spokesman Navarsete stated, "I would urge the government to make a difference...it would attract international attention if Norway gave nuclear whistleblower asylum or emergency passport – despite the Israeli sanctions against him."

On 12 August 2015 Vanunu and his wife applied for family reunification via the Norwegian embassy in Tel Aviv. Vanunu's exit to Norway must be accepted by Israel and his entry approved by Norway. Norway had previously said that they could only issue emergency passports to people who are already on Norwegian soil. However, his wife is a professor at the School of Theology in Oslo, and thus fulfills the requirement that one must be able to provide for their spouse.

On 2 September 2015 Vanunu granted his first interview to Israeli media in a Channel 2 interview regarding the Mossad operative who trapped him in 1986.

In September 2015 Vanunu's eighth Petition to remove the restrictions against him was denied by Israel's High Court.

On 23 December 2015 Vanunu wrote: "Freedom of speech and Freedom of movement. 2016 Freedom year" in an update to his 30 October 2015 statement regarding his 8th Supreme Court Appeal. On 30 October Vanunu wrote: "I had a court hearing on 26 October 2015. We appealed all the restrictions. I even spoke to the Judges. They gave to the police 90 days to end their investigation for the last arrest, after that they will decide."

=== 2016 ===
On 24 February 2016 Vanunu tweeted his latest news regarding Israel's Supreme Court which has ordered the Prosecution to respond no later than 21 April 2016 regarding Vanunu's eight Supreme Court appeal to end all restrictions and allow him to leave Israel.

=== 2017 ===
On 30 January 2017 Vanunu wrote on Facebook that the three Supreme Court judges were to rule "in a few weeks" regarding his latest appeal seeking to end all restrictions against him so that he can leave Israel. As of 3 March 2017, the last Vanunu wrote on Facebook: "Vanunu Mordechai February 15 at 11:52 am ·We are now waiting for the Supreme court decision, it could be any time soon. And it could be good or nothing, so I am used to all this for 31 years,1986-2017. Freedom Must come."

=== 2019 ===
On 2 June 2019 Vanunu reported at his Facebook Wall, "that for the 16th year, after 18 years behind bars" Israel renewed the restrictions against Vanunu "not to meet foreigners, not leave the country".

On 3 December 2019 Israel's Supreme Court dismissed Vanunu's latest petition seeking to end the restraining orders against "his freedom" and "privacy" citing "a concern about the probability of closeness to the certainty that if the restrictions imposed on Vanunu are removed, he will act to publish this [relevant confidential] information."

=== 2020 ===
On 1 June 2020 Vanunu reported on Twitter: "They renew all the restrictions for one more year, from June 2020 to June 2021...I will continue to post every month".

=== 2024 ===
As of July 2024, Vanunu posted on Twitter that all restrictions had been renewed for another year and that he would only be writing his next post from freedom.

Vanunu's Twitter account has since been taken down.

== Arrests and hearings ==
Yossi Melman, an Israeli journalist, wrote in the Israeli newspaper Haaretz "Vanunu's harassment by the Israeli government is unprecedented and represents a distortion of every accepted legal norm." Vanunu was denied parole at a hearing in May 1998. Five years later, parole was again refused. At this parole hearing, Vanunu's lawyer Avigdor Feldman maintained that his client had no more secrets and should be freed. The prosecution argued that the imminent war with Iraq would preclude his release. After the hearing, Feldman said, "The prosecutor said that if Vanunu were released, the Americans would probably leave Iraq and go after Israel and Israel's nuclear weapons - which I found extremely ridiculous." The real force blocking Vanunu's release, who had been known only as "Y", was exposed in 2001 as Yehiyel Horev, the head of Mossad's nuclear and military secrets branch.

=== 2004 ===
Following his release in 2004, Vanunu appeared in Israeli courts on numerous occasions on charges of having violated the terms of his release. He was arrested and detained for attempting to go to Bethlehem. On at least one occasion his room in St. George's Cathedral was raided by police and his belongings were confiscated.

Yehiel Horev, the strictest of all the security chiefs in Israel, especially in regard to the protection of institutions such as the Shimon Peres Negev Nuclear Research Center and the Israel Institute for Biological Research, is apprehensive that if Vanunu goes abroad, he will continue to be a nuisance by stimulating the public debate over Israel's nuclear policy and the nuclear weapons he says Israel possesses. This is the secret that it is claimed has not yet been told in the affair: the story of the security fiasco that made it possible for Vanunu to do what he did, and the story of subsequent attempts to cover-up, whitewash and protect senior figures in the defense establishment, who were bent on divesting themselves of responsibility for the failure.

On 11 November 2004 Vanunu was arrested by the International Investigations Unit of the Israel Police at around 9 am while eating breakfast. The arrest stemmed from an ongoing probe examining suspicions of leaking national secrets and violating legal rulings since his release from prison.

Police raided the walled compound of St. George's Cathedral, removing papers and a computer from Vanunu's room. After a few hours' detention, Vanunu was put under house arrest, which was to last seven days.

On 24 December 2004, in a vehicle marked as belonging to the foreign press, Vanunu was arrested by Israeli Police while he was attempting to enter the West Bank in violation of his release restrictions (see above), allegedly to attend mass at the Church of the Nativity in Bethlehem. After posting bail of 50,000 NIS, he was released into five-day house arrest.

=== 2005 ===
On 26 January 2005 the BBC reported that its Jerusalem deputy bureau chief, Simon Wilson, was banned from Israel after he refused to submit interview material made with Vanunu to Israeli censors. Vanunu gave the interview in violation of court orders. Wilson was allowed to return to Israel on 12 March 2005 after signing an apology letter acknowledging that he defied the law.

On 17 March 2005 Vanunu was charged with 21 counts of "contravening a lawful direction" (maximum penalty two years' imprisonment per count) and one count of "attempting to contravene a lawful direction."

On 18 November that year Vanunu was arrested at the al-Ram checkpoint north of Jerusalem as he was returning by bus from the West Bank. The Israeli authorities claimed Vanunu's travel ban includes visits to the occupied Palestinian Territories.

Vanunu was informed on 13 April that the Israeli government has continued his house arrest in Jerusalem and renewed all the restrictions against him, for the fourth time and third year of detention in east Jerusalem.

On 30 April Vanunu was convicted of violating the order barring foreign contacts and traveling outside Jerusalem.

In July, Vanunu was sentenced to a further six months imprisonment for speaking to foreigners and traveling to Bethlehem. The court's sentence was unexpected, and even the prosecution expected the court to hand down a suspended sentence, meant solely as a deterrent. Following his sentence, Vanunu commented that his conviction proved that Israel was still ruled, in effect, by the British Mandate because the law under which he was convicted is from that era. "Maybe I need to turn to the Queen or to Tony Blair in order to grant me justice," he said.

While having dinner at the American Colony Hotel in East Jerusalem with a foreigner, Vanunu was arrested for the second time on a Christmas Eve.

=== 2008 ===
On 7 January 2008 the day before his appeal against the above sentence was to begin, Vanunu was re-sentenced to six months of community service.

In April 2008 Vanunu learned that Israel had renewed the restrictions against him again.

On 9 April 2008 it was reported that Norway had joined Sweden, Canada and Denmark in refusing asylum to Vanunu.

On 9 April 2008 unclassified documents revealed that the Norwegian Bondevik's Second Cabinet (19 October 2001 – 17 October 2005) denied Vanunu asylum in 2004 as a supportive gesture to Israel.

On 13 May that year Vanunu wrote that although three judges had attempted to convince the Government Lawyer to offer community service in East Jerusalem, it had been denied. Vanunu's appeal against his six-month jail sentence was set to resume on 8 July 2008

On 15 May 2008 the Norwegian Lawyer's Petition called upon the Norwegian government to urgently implement a three-point action plan within the framework of international and Norwegian law, to grant Vanunu asylum and permission to work and stay in Norway.

On 23 September 2008 the Jerusalem District Court announced: "In light of (Vanunu's) ailing health and the absence of claims that his actions put the country's security in jeopardy, we believe his sentence should be reduced." Vanunu said his health is fine and that, "The issue is about my right to be free, my right to speak and my right to leave the state."

In October Scottish First Minister Alex Salmond voiced support for him and stated his shared opposition to the proliferation of nuclear weapons.

On 26 November it was reported that "Vanunu's Supreme Court appeal fighting a three-month jail sentence [reduced from six] for speaking to foreigners – who happened to be media – in 2004, was scheduled to be heard in the New Year."

=== 2009 ===
On 14 June 2009 Vanunu stated, "The Central Commander of the General Army testified in court that it is OK if I speak in public as long as I do not talk about nuclear weapons... They renewed the restrictions to not speak to foreigners until November. The appeal [against three months in jail for speaking to foreign media in 2004] was scheduled for January, then 6 May and 18 June. Now I am waiting for a new court date."

On 6 July Vanunu's "attorney Avigdor Feldman...and the state agreed that after six months, pending a review of his conduct, Vanunu will be able to ask for the restrictions to be lifted and be allowed to travel abroad."

Vanunu was arrested by Jerusalem Police on 28 December in a hotel, following an alleged meeting with his girlfriend. The following day, Russian media reported that a search of Vanunu's belongings uncovered a letter from an American causing Israeli officials to be concerned that "he could be orchestrating something."

=== 2010 ===
On 1 January 2010 it was revealed that Vanunu has known his Norwegian girlfriend, Kristin Joachimsen, a scholar and an associate professor of biblical studies, for two years.

Vanunu published a video message to the media on 7 January regarding his most recent arrest and Israel's "impotent" nuclear ambiguity.

On 14 April that year Vanunu reported that the restrictions denying him the right to leave Israel were renewed for another year.

On 11 May 2010 the Israeli Supreme Court ruled that Vanunu would "serve a three-month jail sentence handed to him by Jerusalem District Court and not community service" which would begin 23 May 2010.

Vanunu had been sentenced to community service but stated his refusal to perform community service in west Jerusalem, claiming that he would be in danger of being assaulted by a member of the Israeli public. He offered to instead do community service in east Jerusalem. The Court refused Vanunu's offer. Eleven days earlier, Amnesty International had released a press release following the announcement of this sentence: "If Mordechai Vanunu is imprisoned again, Amnesty International will declare him to be a prisoner of conscience and call for his immediate and unconditional release."

On 24 May 2010, Vanunu began serving his three-month prison sentence. On 18 June, it was reported that Vanunu had been placed in solitary confinement. Vanunu was released from prison on 8 August.

=== 2011 ===
On 14 July 2011, Vanunu appealed to the Israeli Supreme Court to instruct Interior Minister Eli Yishai to revoke his Israeli citizenship, claiming that "the Israeli street" and media were treating him belligerently, and that he could "no longer find his place in Israeli society", and that despite his release from prison, "the State of Israel continues to penalise him by imposing various restrictions on his person and travels".

Vanunu's appeal noted an amendment to the Citizenship Act which allowed the Interior Minister to revoke his citizenship even if he did not hold another one and claimed that revocation of his Israeli citizenship would allow him to seek citizenship or permanent residency in a European country.

On 31 August 2011, Vanunu wrote: "The court hearing about the restrictions, not to speak to foreigners, not to leave Israel will be on Oct' 3 [it is possible the date can be changed]. About canceling my Israel citizenship, we are waiting to hear from the Interior minister or we will have one more court hearing."

=== 2012 ===
Vanunu deactivated his Facebook and Twitter accounts on 1 May 2012, following an announcement that the Israeli government was monitoring those accounts.

On 6 June that year, the High Court of Justice denied Vanunu's petition to renounce his Israeli citizenship. Vanunu said, "I want them to revoke my citizenship so that I can begin my life."

=== 2015 ===
Vanunu was arrested on 23 April 2015, but it was not reported until six days later, when his attorney Michael Sfard posted on his Facebook page, "Vanunu was in a bookstore near the American Colony Hotel in Jerusalem where he met two tourists and to the amazement of the store's customers, it was raided by seven border police...after hours of interrogation, Vanunu was released." Vanunu was arrested on suspicions he had violated the restriction against his speaking with foreigners for more than 30 minutes.

On 25 September 2015, Vanunu reported "Sep. 10- Nine policemen come to my home with a search warrant and arrest warrant, they took all my digitale [sic] stuff, computers, iPhone, memory stick, hard drive, camera, CDs, everything, with all the passwords to all my internet activity. They are still holding all these thing. Sep. 25- I am back on the Internet, after one-week house arrest, and 2 weeks no Internet, all this for giving a TV interview in Hebrew, more than a decade after completing an 18-year jail term."

On 30 October, Vanunu reported regarding his 8th Supreme Court Appeal, "I had a court hearing on [October 26, 2015]. We appealed all the restrictions. I even spoke to the Judges. They gave the police 90 days to end their investigation for the last arrest, after that they will decide. Without Freedom of Speech and without Freedom of Movement in Israel, now without my Computers and iPhone since Sep. 2015."

=== 2016 ===
On 8 May 2016, Vanunu was indicted for "a single meeting with two foreigners that occurred three years ago", for moving into a different apartment at the same address, and for an interview he gave to Danny Kushmaro on Channel 2, which had passed the censor.

On 4 July that year, Vanunu's trial for allegedly sharing classified information in an interview with Israel's Channel 2 television channel, for moving into a different apartment without informing the police, and for meeting with two foreign nationals three years earlier began.

=== 2017 ===
On 26 January 2017, Vanunu tweeted that on 30 January 2017 he would return to Supreme Court petitioning for the end of all restrictions, so that he could leave Israel.

Israel's Supreme Court denied Vanunu's latest appeal to end all restrictions and allow him to leave Israel on 6 April that year.

On 10 July, the Jerusalem Magistrate's Court gave Vanunu a two-month suspended jail sentence unless "he commits another similar violation [speaking to foreigners] in the next three years." He was also sentenced to 120 hours of community service.

Vanunu returned to Israel's Supreme Court on 6 November 2017 seeking to end the restrictions holding him in Israel so that he could be reunited with his wife in Norway. On 14 November 2017, Israel's Supreme Court rejected Vanunu's twelfth appeal.

=== 2018 ===
On 2 June 2018, Vanunu tweeted, "after 32 years of all the Israel Nuclear secrets had gone to all the world they still claim I am a security risk" and on 3 July, he tweeted "They renew all the restrictions for another year after 14 years and 18 years in prison."

== Awards, honours, and works ==
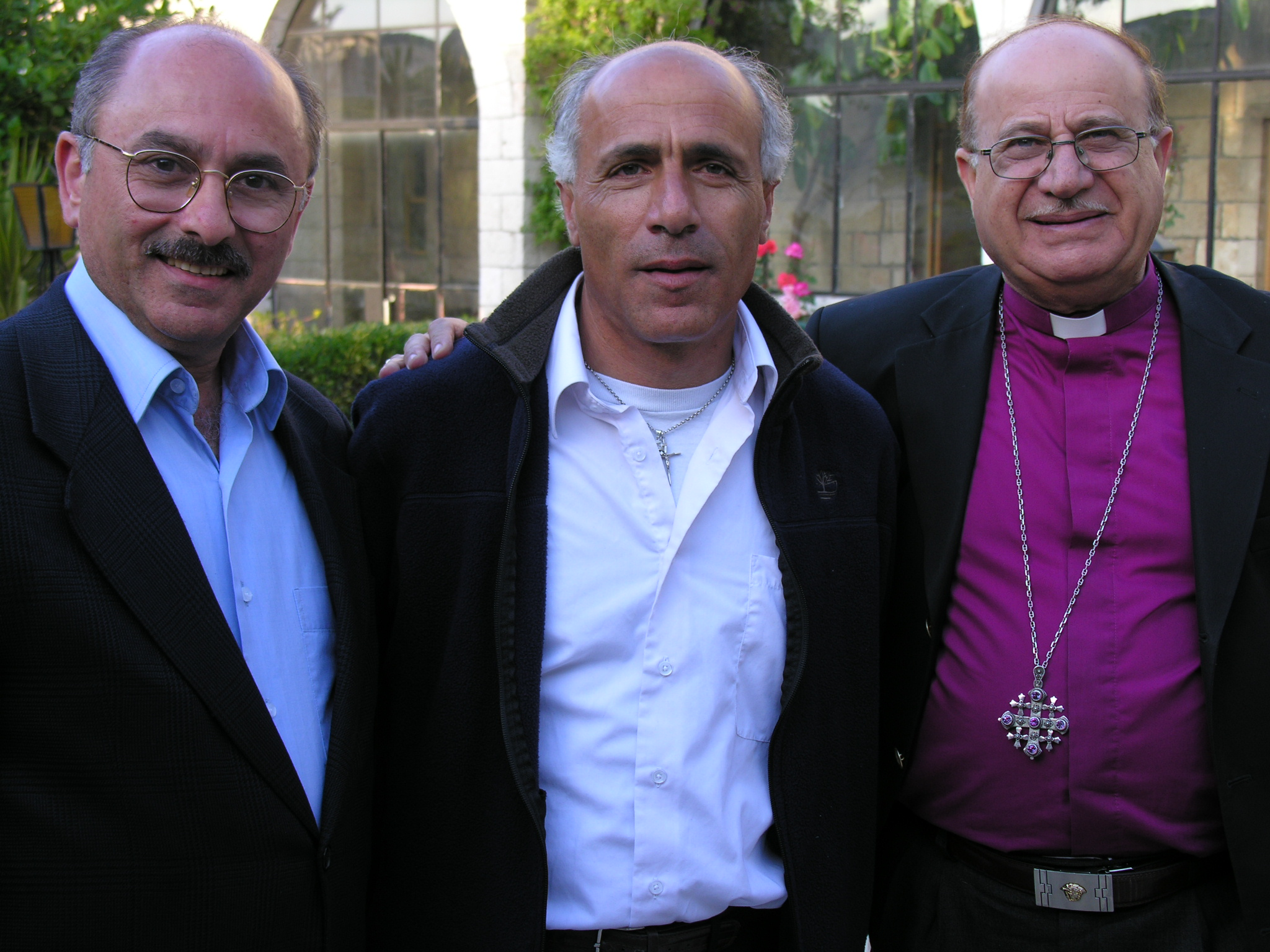
Meeting with Vanunu, Ali Kazak, and Bishop Riah Abu Assal in Jerusalem 2005

Vanunu wrote the satirical poem "I'm Your Spy" early during the first eleven-and-a-half years he was held in strict isolation.

=== 1987 ===
Vanunu received the Right Livelihood Award in 1987.

=== 2001 ===
He was given an honorary doctorate by the University of Tromsø in 2001.

=== 2004 ===
In September 2004, Vanunu received the LennonOno Grant for Peace, a peace prize founded by artist and musician Yoko Ono in memory of John Lennon, her late husband.

In December 2004, he was elected by the students of the University of Glasgow to serve for three years as Rector. On 22 April 2005, he was formally installed in the post but could not carry out any of its functions as he was still confined to Israel. The Herald newspaper launched a campaign for his release.

=== 2005 ===
In 2005 he received the Peace Prize of the Norwegian People (Folkets fredspris). Previous recipients of this prize include Vytautas Landsbergis (1991), Alva Myrdal (1982), Mairead Maguire and Betty Williams. On 24 February 2010, Nobel Institute Director, Geir Lundestad, announced that for the second year in a row, Mordechai Vanunu had declined the honour of being nominated for the Nobel Peace Prize.

=== 2009 ===
In March 2009, after being nominated as a potential recipient of the Nobel Peace Prize, Vanunu wrote to the Nobel Peace Prize Committee in Oslo:

I am asking the committee to remove my name from the list for this year's list of nominations. I cannot be part of a list of laureates that includes Shimon Peres, the President of Israel. He is the man who was behind all the Israeli atomic policy. Peres established and developed the atomic weapon program in Dimona in Israel. Peres was the man who ordered the kidnapping of me in Italy Rome, Sept. 30, 1986, and for the secret trial and sentencing of me as a spy and traitor for 18 years in isolation in prison in Israel. Until now he continues to oppose my freedom and release, in spite of my serving full sentence of 18 years. For all these reasons I don't want to be nominated and will not accept this nomination. I say No to any nomination as long as I am not free, that is, as long as I am still forced to be in Israel. What I want is freedom and only freedom.

=== 2010 ===
On 21 September 2010, the Teach Peace Foundation recognised Mordechai Vanunu for his courageous actions to halt the development and proliferation of weapons of mass destruction by the Israeli government.

On 4 October 2010, the International League for Human Rights announced that Vanunu was awarded the Carl von Ossietzky Medal for 2010 and, on 16 November, sent open letters to Israeli Prime Minister Benjamin Netanyahu, Defence Minister Ehud Barak and Interior Minister Eli Yishai, seeking Vanunu's free departure out of Israel to allow him to receive the medal at the Award Ceremony in Berlin on 12 December 2010. Nobel laureates cited as co-signatories to the letter include Mairead Maguire, Günter Grass, Harold W. Kroto, and Jack Steinberger.

The request was refused and the 12 December Berlin medal ceremony was restyled as a protest event in support of Vanunu and nuclear disarmament. On this occasion, a musical composition, The Dove, was dedicated to Vanunu and given its premiere performance.

== See also ==
- List of peace activists
- Human rights in Israel
- List of whistleblowers
- Karen Silkwood
- Nuclear-Free Future Award
- Nuclear proliferation
- Nuclear weapons of Israel
- Gideon Spiro
- Omid Kokabee, Andrei Sakharov
- List of nuclear whistleblowers

Academic offices
Preceded by Greg Hemphill	Rector of the University of Glasgow; 2004–2008	Succeeded by Charles Kennedy
