= Cheryl Bentov =

American realtor and former Mossad spy (born 1960)

Cheryl Ben Tov שריל בנטוב
- Born: Cheryl Hanin; 1959 or 1960 (age 66–67)
- Other name: Cindy
- Known for: Entrapping Israeli nuclear technician Mordechai Vanunu
- Espionage activity
- Country: Israel
- Allegiance: Israel
- Service branch: Mossad

Cheryl Ben Tov (Hebrew: שריל בנטוב; born Cheryl Hanin in 1959 or 1960), is an American real estate agent and former Israeli Mossad agent.

== Biography ==
In 1986, under the name "Cindy", she persuaded former Israeli nuclear technician Mordechai Vanunu to go with her to Rome, with the purpose of ultimately taking him to Israel. Vanunu faced a secret trial and was sentenced to 18 years in prison, spending nearly 12 of them in solitary confinement. Vanunu had publicly released secret information on Israel's nuclear reactor and stated that Israel had created nuclear weapons, becoming the sixth nuclear power and the first since the 1968 Treaty on the Non-Proliferation of Nuclear Weapons, of which Israel was not a signatory.

A feature in The Times reported that Hanin was American-born but had moved to Israel as a teenager. Hanin grew up in Pennsylvania and Orlando, Florida in a Jewish family. Her father, Stanley Hanin, had founded Allied Discount Tires.

She spent a semester in Israel during high school at the Alexander Muss Institute for Israel Education in Hod Hasharon, and upon her graduation in 1978, joined the Israeli Army. In 1985, she married Ofer Ben Tov, himself an Israeli intelligence officer, and at some point before 1986 was recruited and trained by the Mossad. In 1986, she was one of the Mossad agents that abducted Mordechai Vanunu.

In 1988, newspaper journalists traced her to her home in Netanya, Israel, where she owned a villa that she rented out.

In 2004, it was reported that she lived in the suburbs of Orlando, Florida, with her husband and their two daughters, working as a real estate agent.
