= History of the Israeli intelligence community =

Brief history of Israeli Intelligence Community

The history of Israel's intelligence services dates back to 1929, during the British Mandate in Palestine, many years before the declaration of an independent Jewish state. Conflicts with the Arab population, as well as contradictions with the British authorities, required intelligence assessment to prevent militant attacks on Jewish settlements and to ensure the illegal immigration of Jews into Palestine. It was at this time that the first Jewish intelligence service, the Shai, was established.

After the declaration of the State of Israel in 1948, the intelligence services were reorganized along British lines. As a result, the prototypes of the modern Israeli intelligence services emerged: Shin Bet (Hebrew שירות הביטחון הכללי) and AMAN (Hebrew אגף המודיעין) under the Ministry of Defense and the Political Directorate under the Ministry of Foreign Affairs. The establishment of the first foreign residences began.

Numerous tensions between the military and political intelligence services led to their reorganization according to American lines in 1951. It was then that the legendary Mossad (Hebrew המוסד למודיעין ולתפקידים מיוחדים) was created, reporting directly to the Prime Minister and eventually gaining the power of the KGB and CIA. Isser Harel, who headed the Mossad from 1952 to 1963, also supervised all other intelligence services and became the No. 2 man in the state.

In 1957, the Lekem Bureau was established to protect nuclear facilities, as well as nuclear and then high-tech espionage. The bureau was later disbanded.

The history of Israeli intelligence is marked by both brilliant operations (the Eichmann's kidnapping, the infiltration of high-level illegal aliens, the recruitment of high-ranking officials, the liquidation of terrorists, the prevention of terrorist attacks) and serious problems (the "blindness" on the eve of the Yom Kippur War, the assassination of Prime Minister Yitzhak Rabin, the failure of agents, unsuccessful sabotage).

To this day, Israeli intelligence has three main services: Mossad, Shin Bet and Military Intelligence Directorate (AMAN) which function, despite some crises, and protect the state interests and security of Israel.

== Background ==
The first Jewish intelligence organization in Palestine was established in 1918, 30 years before the establishment of the State of Israel. The "Intelligence Bureau" was established by the "Council of Delegates" (Vaad Hatzirim), which regulated all activities of the Jewish community in Palestine. The Bureau was headed by Levi Yitzhak Schneorson, a former member of the Nili, an underground organization that informed the British Armed Forces about the state of the Ottoman army during World War I. The Bureau operated first from an office in Jaffa, then in Jerusalem. Its agents recruited informants who, for money, provided information on Arab leaders, nationalist groups, and others. Special attention was paid to gathering information about those who intended to harm Jews. The information was passed on to the "Council of Delegates" and sometimes to the British police.

== British Mandatory in Palestine ==
=== The Shai foundation ===
The history of Israel's intelligence services dates back to 1929, during the British Mandate in Palestine. The increase in Arab violence since 1920, and especially the mass pogroms of 1929, in which 133 Jews were killed and 339 wounded in one week, prompted the establishment of an information and intelligence service within the Jewish self-defense organization "Haganah". The creation of such a service, called "Information Service" (Hebrew שירות ידיעות) or abbreviated Shai (Hebrew ש"י), was initiated in 1929 by the National Committee and the Jewish Agency ("Sokhnut" — the prototype of the future government of Israel). In parallel, the political department of "Sokhnut" began its operational work. Its main directions were the collection of political and military information in the Near East and other countries, and the creation of a network of agents to monitor the Jewish population around the world.

Despite its best efforts, the Arab Revolt of 1936 took the Shai by surprise. Unlike previous acts of violence, the attacks were well-planned and centrally controlled. At the same time, the Shai had no intelligence processing center, so local agents acted independently and did not even coordinate information.

In April 1936, one of the commanders of the Jewish self-defense units "Haganah" asked Ezra Danin, who had extensive acquaintances among Arabs, to find out who had killed two unarmed Jews on April 15 on the road between the village of Anabta and the British camp of Nur Shams. At the same time, Ezra Danin recruited his first agent, an Arab who agreed to report anything he learned about the militants' plans to attack Jewish settlements.

Danin approached the political department of the Jewish Agency and proposed the creation of a network of agents among the Arabs. Six pounds sterling per month was allocated for this purpose. In the end, Danin paid the agents he recruited out of his own pocket. In late August 1936, at the height of the Arab revolt, Danin wrote a two-page memorandum proposing the creation of a special intelligence service in the Haganah and explaining why it was needed. Along with Danin, Reuven Shiloach (Zaslansky), who worked in the political department of the Jewish Agency, and Shaul Avigur (Meyerow), one of the leaders of the Haganah, participated in the creation of the intelligence service.

In the summer of 1940, an Arab department was established at Haganah headquarters, headed by Danin. His deputy was Shimshon Mashbetz. Almost simultaneously, a counterintelligence department (Rigul Negdi) was established to counter the infiltration of British agents into the Haganah, headed by Shaul Avigur and David Shaltiel. Centralized collection and processing of information from regional staff was in place.

Danin saw his main task as developing a theory of intelligence work applicable to Palestinian conditions. It was he who formulated the key principle of Israeli intelligence: "Know your enemy". He asserted:

We are not against all the Arabs in general, but against a very specific Arab. We have to know who he is. Some young man sits down on a hill or down in the valley and shoots, and we all scream and panic and jump into the trenches, whereas we should be dealing with a specific Ali or Mohammed. We should be identifying him and taking action against him.

Danin counted 25 organizations and fields of activity in which Arabs and Jews worked together. For example, freight and shipping, telecommunications, railroads, journalism, municipalities, prisons, and British administrative offices. He proposed that Jewish workers recruit Arab agents there. This concept differed from British intelligence methods, which only sought potential informants in political, paramilitary, and subversive organizations.

Initially, "Sherut Yediot" consisted of three divisions: Internal Security (the so-called "Jewish Division"), Political (infiltration of the British authorities), and Arab. Three regional divisions were also planned, but at the time they existed only on paper.

=== Reorganization in 1942 ===
In March 1942 the Shai was reorganized. It was stripped of its counterintelligence functions and removed from the structure of the military organs. The Shai was placed directly under the "Haganah" leadership and the "Jewish Agency" political department. Instead of Moshe Shertok, the entire Shai intelligence service was headed by Yisrael Amir, who had previously been in charge of arms procurement for the "Haganah". The organization operated under the guise of the "Soldiers' Welfare Committee" and was headquartered in Tel Aviv at 85 Ben Yehuda Street.

The political division was headed by Boris Guriel (Gurevich) from 1945, the Arab division was headed by Ezra Danin (who was the only professional in the organization), from 1945 his assistant instead of Mashbetz was Binyamin Gibli (future head of military intelligence) The Jewish division was headed by Joseph Krakovsky and by 1944 he was replaced by Isser Harel (future head of the Shi Bet and Mossad).

During World War II, a file cabinet on Arab extremists began to be created and was systematized by 1943. Open source intelligence gathering was organized, research into the demographics, economics and culture of the Arab community was initiated, and the interception of British and Arab telephone conversations was introduced. The last chief of the Shai was Lieutenant Colonel Isser Be'eri, who succeeded David Shaltiel as of February 1948.

At the same time, Reuven Shiloach formulated the goals and objectives of the Israeli intelligence services, which remain relevant to this day:

The Arabs are the number one enemy of the Jewish community, and professional agents must be infiltrated into the Arab environment. Israeli intelligence must not be limited to Palestine. It must fulfill the role of the Jewish-Zionist guarantor of the security of Jews throughout the world. Covert activities should be based on modern technology, utilizing the latest advances in espionage, and maintaining links with friendly services in the U.S. and European countries. (Reuven Shiloah)

Thus, by the time of the declaration of the State of Israel, the theoretical and personnel basis for the establishment of the intelligence services of the new state had been prepared.

== 1948-1951 period ==
=== Reorganization in 1948 ===
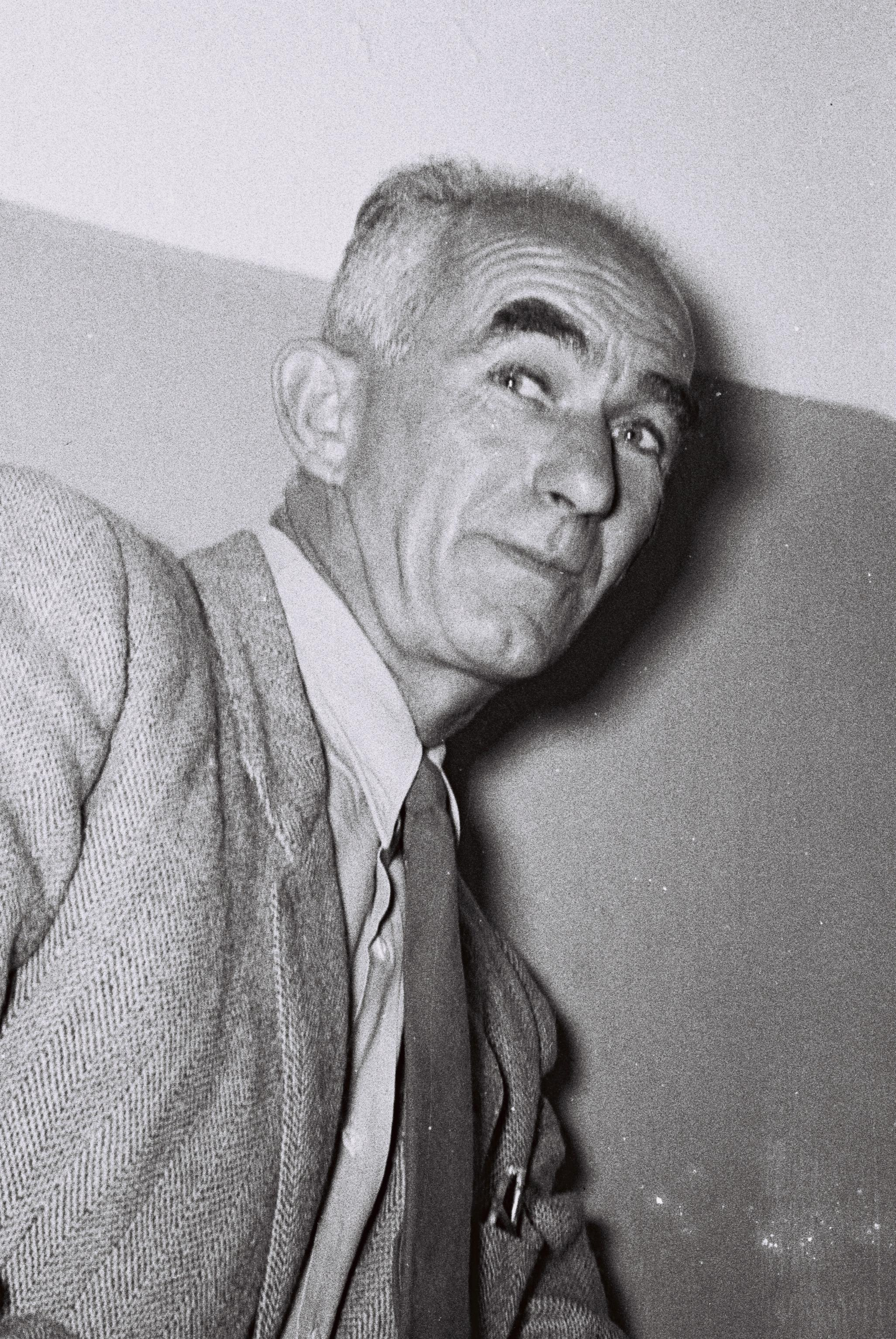
Isser Be'eri is the first head of Israeli military intelligence

With the beginning of the second phase of the Palestine war in May 1948, the network of informants created by Danin practically collapsed — the settlements were separated by the front line, and the Shai did not yet have radio transmitters. At the outbreak of the war, the entire Jewish secret service had 68 employees.

On June 7, Israeli Prime Minister David Ben-Gurion summoned two Haganah officers he trusted, Reuven Shiloach and Isser Be'eri. The three decided to reorganize Israeli intelligence along British lines.

On June 30, Be'eri called a meeting at Shai's headquarters at 85 Ben-Yehuda Street in Tel Aviv. In addition to Be'eri himself, five top leaders of the organization were present: Avraham Kidron from the Galilee, David Karon from the Negev, Binyamin Gibli from Jerusalem, Isser Harel from Tel Aviv, and Boris Guriel, who headed the political directorate of the newly created Foreign Ministry. At this meeting, Be'eri announced that the "Old Man" (as Ben-Gurion was colloquially known) had decided to disband the Shai and reorganize the intelligence services.

Lt. Col. Be'eri headed the Military Intelligence (Sherut Modiin, Hebrew שירות מודיעין), with Chaim Herzog as his deputy. The counterintelligence service, called the "Israeli Security Agency", was headed by Isser Harel, and his deputy was Yosef Israeli of the Ministry of Defense. Both services were under the Ministry of Defense. Intelligence operations outside Israel were entrusted to the Political Directorate of the Foreign Ministry, in which a so-called "Research Department" (Mahleket ha-Mihkar) was established for this purpose under Boris Guriel.

Both Military Intelligence and Guriel's department began to establish full-fledged residences outside of Israel. In fact, intelligence work abroad began in 1947, when Shai Intelligence sent a Da'at (Knowledge) group headed by Yehuda Ben-Menachem to Europe for this purpose. After the establishment of the Political Directorate of the Foreign Ministry, Ben-Menachem's connections were transferred to Boris Guriel. The first official Israeli intelligence residence was established in Rome in 1948.

The overall supervision of all intelligence services was entrusted to Reuven Shiloach, who was given the title of Advisor to the Foreign Minister for Special Affairs and was nicknamed "Mr. Intelligence" by his colleagues.

The fourth and separate special organization created by the Haganah in 1937 was the Mossad LeAliyah Bet (Hebrew המוסד לעלייה ב') (Note: "Mossad LeAliyah Bet" should not be confused with the Mossad foreign intelligence agency, established in 1951 — they have nothing in common except the word "Mossad" (i.e., institution or organization) in the name.) or simply Aliyah Bet, which dealt with the illegal immigration of Jews to Palestine. The establishment of the State of Israel, as it turned out, did not solve the problem of legalizing the departure of Jews from many countries, and Aliyah Bet continued its work. This service was headed by Shaul Avigur, who was also in charge of procuring weapons with the help of the Rehesh agency (Hebrew רכש).

=== The Be'eri case ===
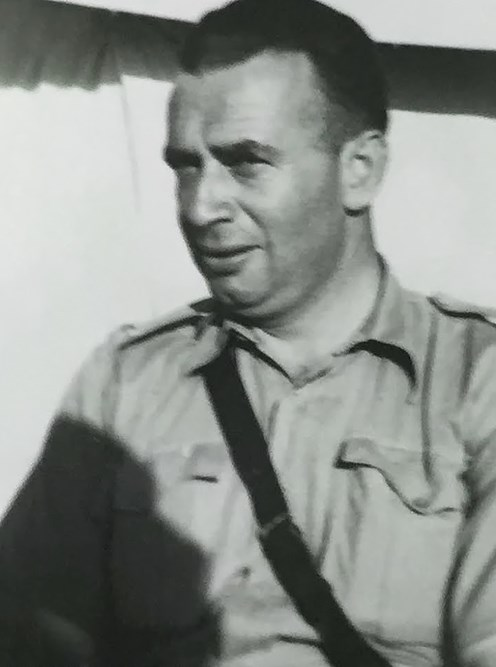
Meir Tobianski — victim of a mistake by the secret intelligence

On June 30, 1948, a few hours after the meeting announcing the dissolution of Shai and the reorganization of the intelligence services, Isser Be'eri ordered the execution of Israeli army captain Meir Tuviansky, whom he and Binyamin Gibli suspected of passing classified information to Jordan via the British.

Isser Be'eri, Binyamin Gibli, Avraham Kidron and David Karon tried Tuviansky in a court-martial (the so-called "Kangaroo Court") and sentenced him to death. The sentence was carried out immediately, without giving Tuviansky the opportunity to defend himself or to appeal. Meir Tuviansky was later posthumously acquitted, rehabilitated, and buried with military honors. Tuviansky became one of only two people executed by conviction in Israel's history, the other being Nazi war criminal Adolf Eichmann, who was hanged in Ramla in 1962.

On May 14, 1948, Be'eri arrested Yehuda Amster, a relative and assistant to Haifa Mayor Abba Hushi, on charges of espionage, and tortured him for 76 days to obtain Hushi's incriminating testimony. Amster was released without charge (August 1, 1948) and his case was kept secret for several years. It was later revealed that Be'eri had fabricated evidence that Hushi had been spying for the British.

In the summer of 1948, Beeri ordered the assassination of his own agent, Ali Kassem, an Arab he suspected of "double-dealing".

Following these events, a committee of inquiry was set up at the request of David Ben-Gurion, which, after reviewing Be'eri's activities, recommended that he be dismissed from his post. Be'eri was dismissed from the army. His deputy, Chaim Herzog, became head of Military Intelligence. A military court found Isser Be'eri guilty of Kassem's murder and demoted him to private. He was then tried again for the murder of Meir of Tuvian and the torture of Amster. In November 1949 the court again found Beeri guilty. However, considering the circumstances and the merits of the defendant, he was sentenced to one day in prison. Be'eri was pardoned by Israel's first president, Chaim Weizmann.

Be'eri himself and his son Itai later claimed that the Big Isser was merely following orders from David Ben-Gurion.

The Be'eri case was an important precedent for bringing the work of Israeli intelligence under the rule of law. Be'eri's argument that intelligence and law enforcement were incompatible was rejected by the court.

=== Intelligence work coordination ===
Due to the struggle for power between various intelligence services, especially between Military Intelligence and the Political Department of the Foreign Ministry, Ben-Gurion continued the reforms in 1949. The "Intelligence Coordination Committee" (Vaadat rashei ha-Sherutim; Hebrew ועדת ראשי השירותים) or abbreviated "Varash", headed by Reuven Shiloach, met for the first time in April 1949. This committee included the heads of the intelligence services, their deputies, and the Inspector General of the Police.

On December 13, 1949, Ben-Gurion signed a secret letter to the Foreign Ministry announcing the organizational unification of all intelligence services under Shiloach, with personal subordination to the Prime Minister. A "Central Authority for the Concentration and Coordination of Intelligence and Security Services" ("ha-Mosad Leteum") was established. Reuven Shiloach was appointed adviser to the prime minister on foreign policy and strategic affairs.

Some of the intelligence traditions introduced under Shiloach have survived for decades. Thus, the staff of the intelligence services is quite small (the Mossad had only 1200 people including technical staff until the beginning of the 21st century), but uses a very large number of recruited agents, of which the Mossad alone has about 35 thousand. In addition to agents, they use volunteer helpers —sayanims—, who are traditionally recruited among Jews from different countries.

=== Spies revelation ===
The duplication of functions and certain personalities of Guriel's staff created a conflict that ended with the so-called "Spy Revolt" in 1951.

The conflict between Military Intelligence and the Shabak, on the one hand, and Guriel's office, on the other, stemmed from fundamentally different approaches to work and life. Asher Ben-Natan, nicknamed Handsome Arthur, was in charge of intelligence operations abroad in the political department of the Foreign Ministry. Colonel Binyamin Gibli, who became head of Military Intelligence after Be'eri's removal and Chaim Herzog's departure for diplomatic work, detested the mannerisms of Ben-Natan and his men from the European residences, who dined in expensive restaurants, wasted large sums of money, but achieved poor results in terms of the quality of information. Gibli was supported by the head of the Shabak, Isser Harel, who believed that an intelligence officer should lead a modest, almost puritanical lifestyle. Harel wrote on the subject:

Guriel and Ben-Natan saw intelligence as a tool for carrying out all kinds of illegal and immoral activities. They saw intelligence work in Europe in a romantic and adventurous light. They saw themselves as the only experts in the world... and behaved like international spies — at home in the glory and shadows of the border between law and lawlessness.

Guriel's agents, on the other hand, despised the uneducated and untrained "military and police officers" and believed that they could not make good spies.

In 1950, Gibli and Harel began sending intelligence officers outside Israel, competing with the political department, and Ben-Natan undertook to open the diplomatic mail of foreign missions in Israel, encroaching on Isser Harel's area of responsibility. After Harel complained to Ben-Gurion, Boris Guriel was demoted and banned from all activities in Israel. The conflict did not take long to affect the results of the work and especially the partnership with friendly intelligence services of other countries, especially Italy and France. It came to the point that Ben-Natan's European intelligence officers began smuggling, motivated by the expense of operational needs. When these scandals reached Ben-Gurion, he became furious and ordered the coordinator of the intelligence services, Reuven Shiloach, to put a stop to it. As a result, Guriel was fired, the relevant department in the Foreign Ministry was disbanded, and the residents were informed that they would now work under Shiloach.

Guriel took this information in stride. However, on March 2, 1951, Ben-Natan gathered in Switzerland on the shores of Lake Geneva European residents who had previously worked under his leadership, and they actually went on strike, declaring that they would not continue their previous work. Ben-Natan himself remained in Switzerland, and some of his men even refused to hand over documents and information about ongoing operations to Shiloah. The revolt was put down quickly and effectively — with Ben-Gurion's support, all the functions of the Machleket ha-Mihkar were transferred to Military Intelligence. Gibli quickly established "Unit 131" to infiltrate Arab countries, and most of the agents returned to their duties.

=== Reorganization in 1951 ===
The transfer of all intelligence functions to the military was not the best solution: the new head of the European Residence, Lieutenant Colonel Mordechai Ben-Tzur, was not very suitable for this work, and Ghibli himself was more inclined to sabotage than to intelligence activities.

The problems in the work of the intelligence services in the late 1940s and early 1950s led to a new reorganization, already based on the American model. This scheme is generally still in use today.

The "Institute for Intelligence and Special Tasks" (ha-Mosad le-modiin u-le-tafkidim meyuhadim, (Hebrew המוסד למודיעין ולתפקידים מיוחדים), known as Mossad, began operating on the ruins of the Political Department. Reuven Shiloach was appointed its director, with a direct reporting line to the Prime Minister.

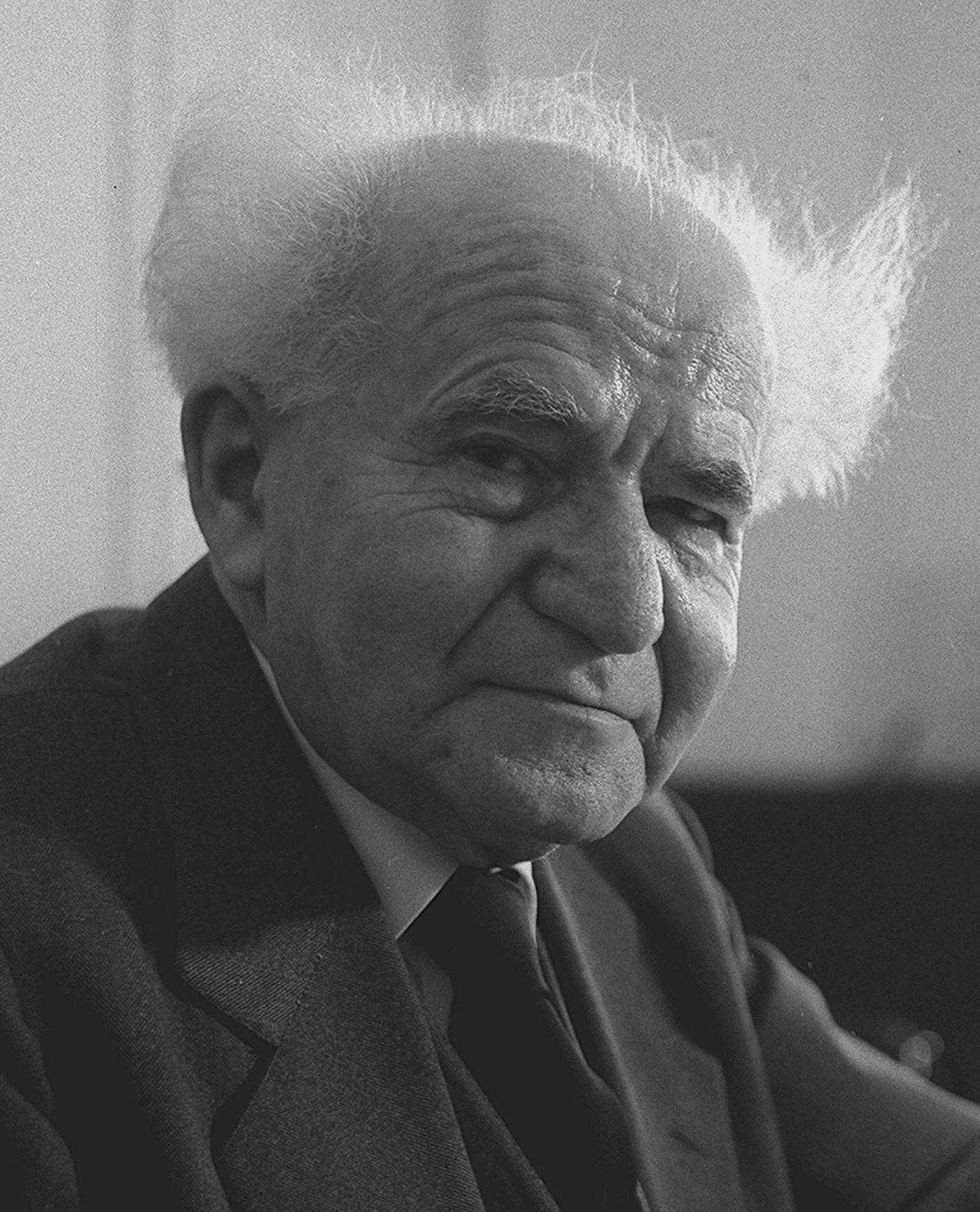
David Ben-Gurion — Israel's first Prime Minister

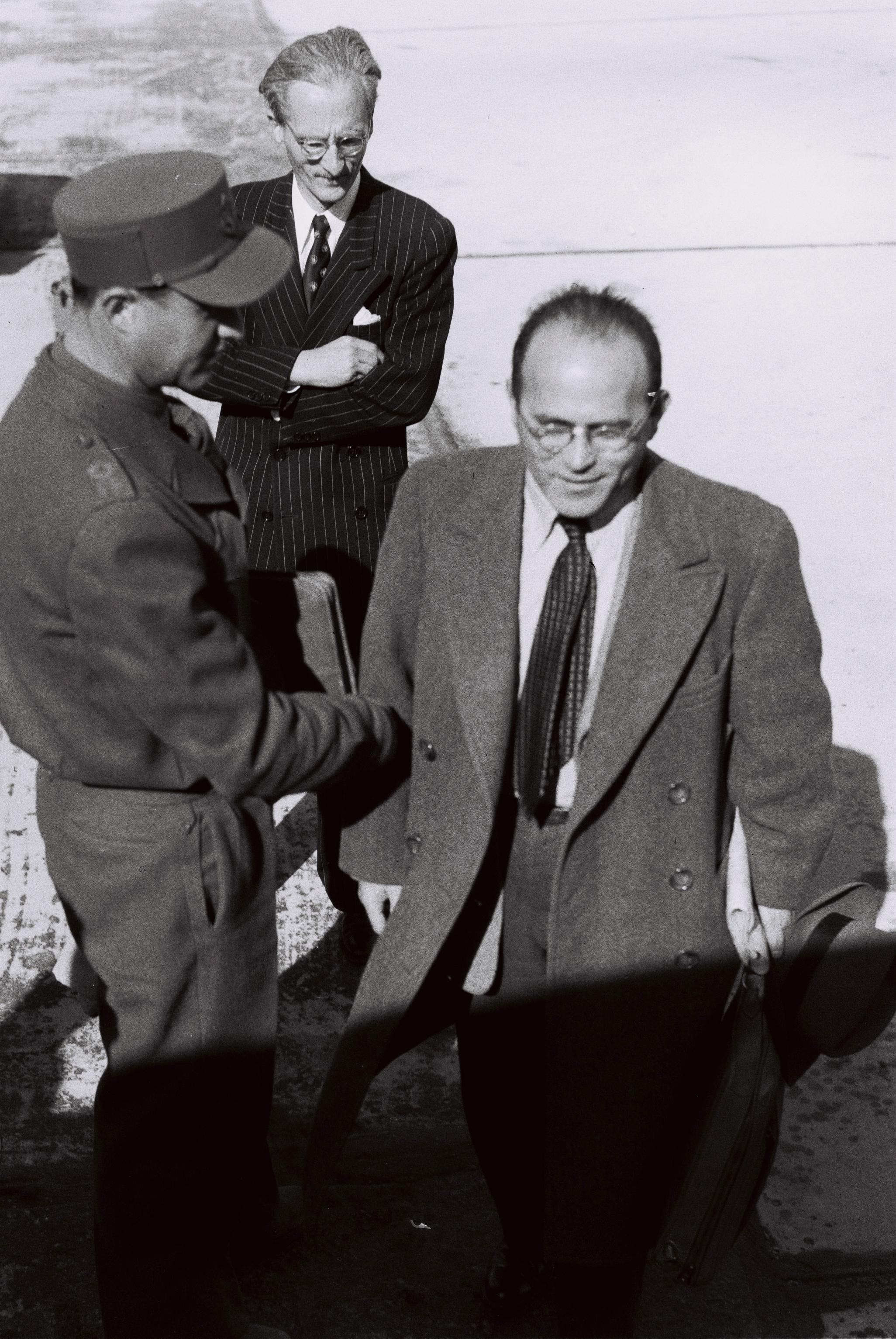
Reuven Shiloach, “Mr. Intelligence”, the first director of the Mossad

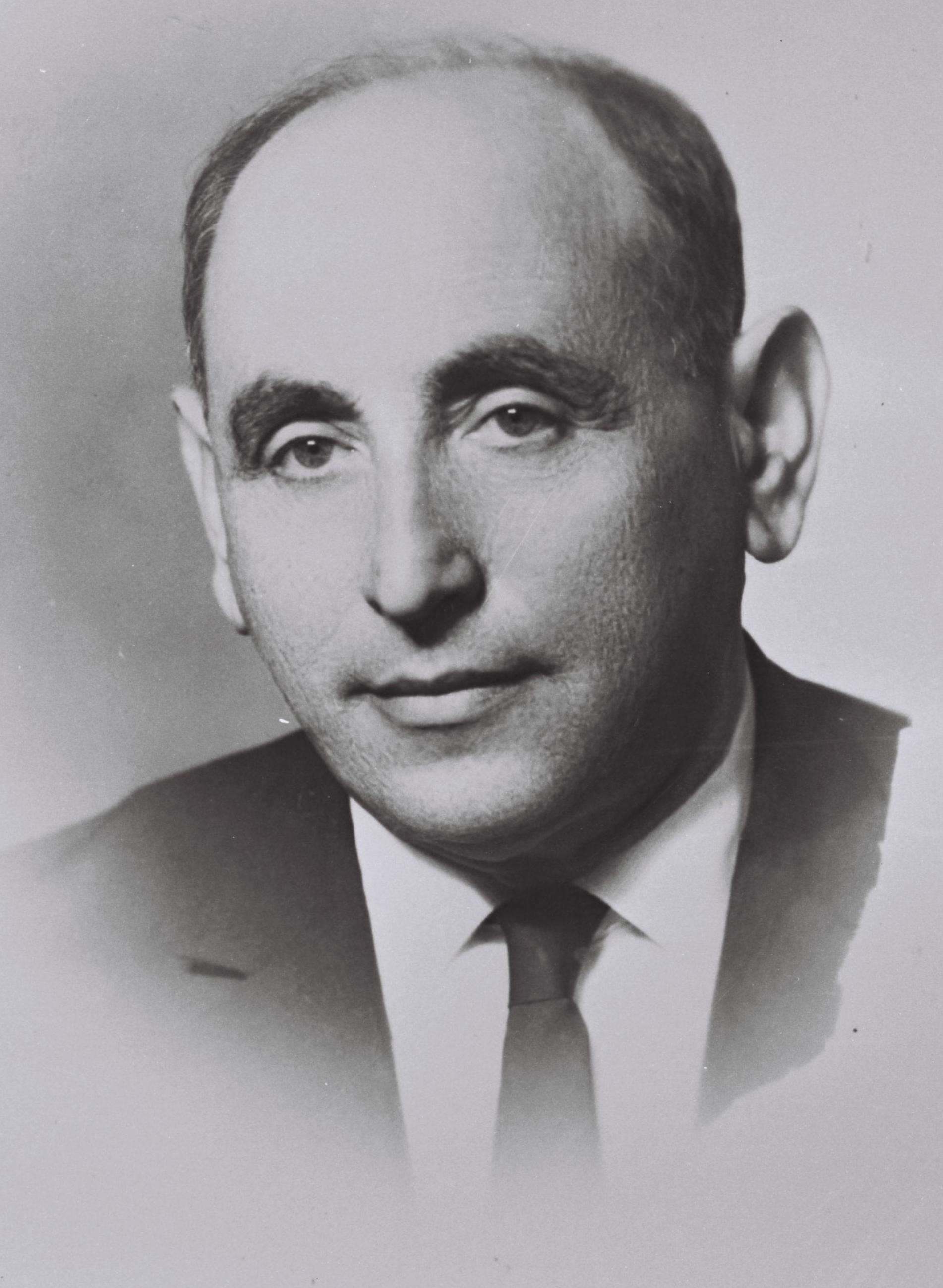
Isser Harel — “memuneh”, head of all intelligence services from 1952 to 1963.

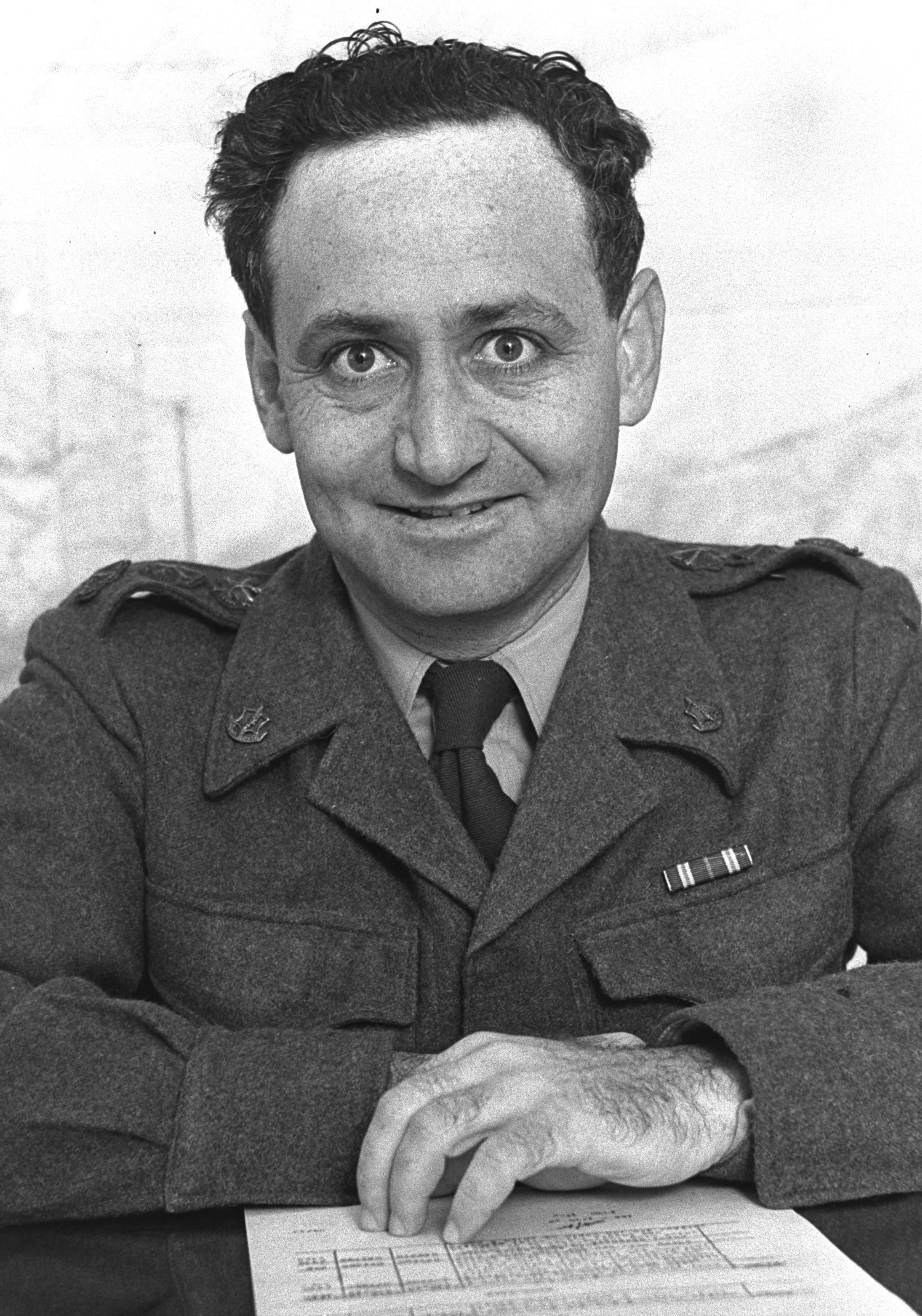
Yehoshafat Harkabi, head of military intelligence (1955–1959).

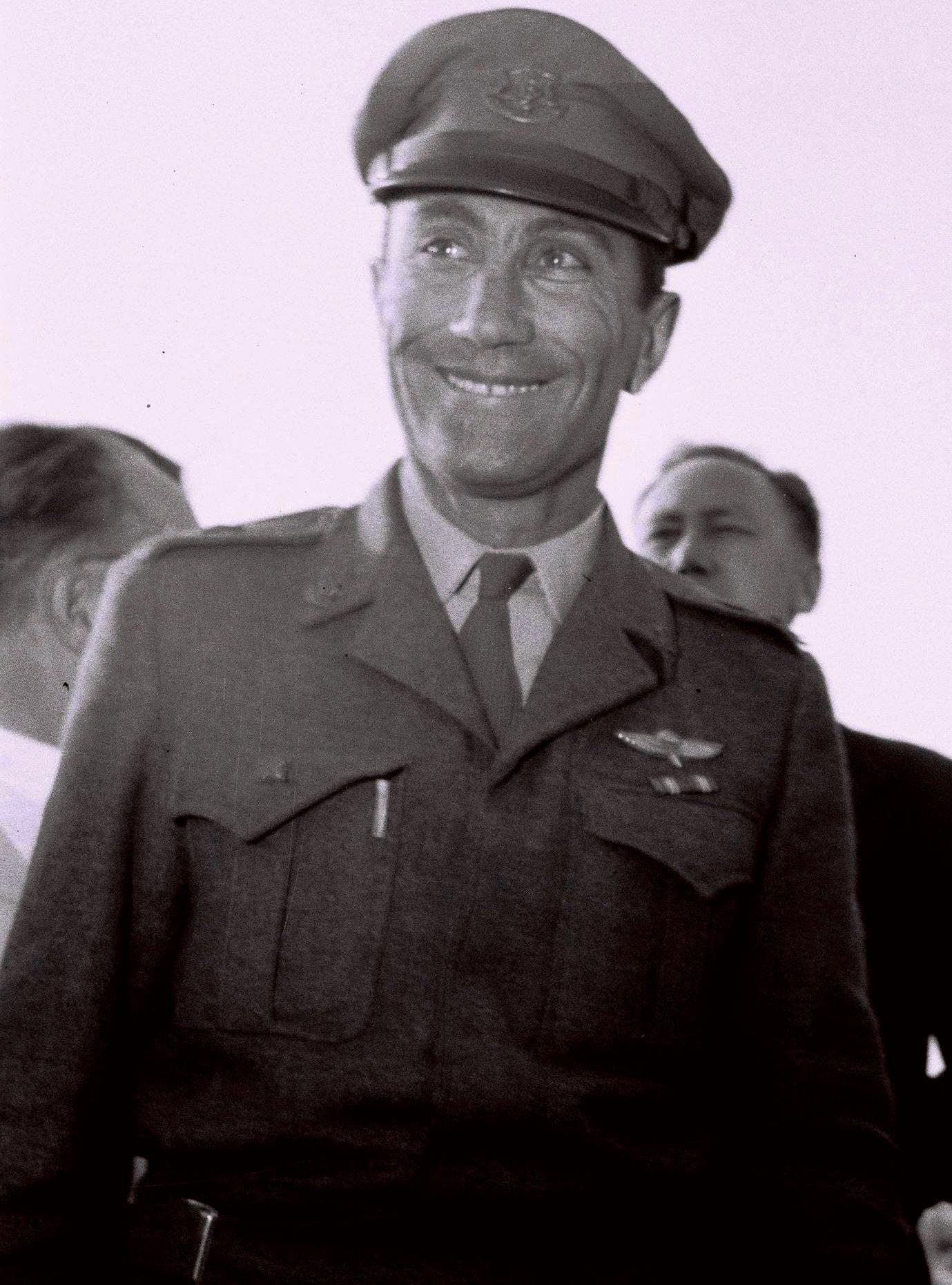
Meir Amit, head of AMAN (1962–1963) and Mossad (1963–1968).

On March 2, 1951, by order of Ben-Gurion, an independent central body was established to conduct intelligence activities abroad. This body was called "Ha-Rashut" ("The Directorate"). Haim Ya'ari was appointed its head. From the day of its establishment, "Ha-Rashut" was the main body of the Mossad and included representatives of the other two intelligence services, both at the staff and operational levels. Thus, the Mossad left the subordination of the Foreign Ministry and came under the Prime Minister's authority and was included in the apparatus of the head of the government. Until 1957, the Mossad had no operational units, so it could only carry out operations using agents from other intelligence services.

Military intelligence was also reorganized. Instead of "Sherut Modi'in", it became known as Agaf Modi'in shel mate ha-klali (Hebrew אגף המודיעין) — "General Staff Intelligence Division" — or AMAN for short, and was placed under the General Staff of the Israel Defense Forces. Under its control were the intelligence services of the army, the air force and the navy. The functions of military counterintelligence (with the exception of the field services) were transferred to the General Security Service of Israel — "Shabak". The head of AMAN remained Ghibli. Military Intelligence was also tasked with censoring the Israeli media, a job that AMAN still does today.

The activity of "Aliyah Bet" was considered unsatisfactory in view of the situation of the Jews in the USSR and the Eastern Bloc countries. Therefore, in June 1951, instead of "Aliyah Bet" for work in these countries was established "Bureau for Relations with Jews" (Hebrew נתיב - לשכת הקשר), which became known as "Nativ", and assistance in the implementation of the departure of Jews from other countries was entrusted to Mossad. The Nativ Bureau was subordinate to the Prime Minister, and Avigur remained its head. "Nativ lost its status as an intelligence agency at the end of the 1990s.

=== Summary of the period ===
The period up to 1952 is characterized by numerous reorganizations of the special services and growth pains associated with their initial formation. This was due to changes in the external political environment and the complexity of the tasks assigned to the new intelligence services — from military operations to defending the state in a hostile environment. Nevertheless, the British Joint Intelligence Center (JIC) noted in 1953 that "the security standards of the Israeli police and security services are high and are based on British methods of training and work". The structure of three main intelligence services, one of which (Military Intelligence) reports to the Chief of Staff and through him to the Minister of Defense, and the other two (Political Intelligence and Internal Security) directly to the Prime Minister, has remained unchanged since then.

== 1952—1962 period ==
Reuven Shiloach, who became head of Mossad, was a good theorist but a poor practitioner, incapable of the day-to-day hard work. Shiloach himself realized that he was out of place and resigned on September 12, 1952.

The position of director of the Mossad, and at the same time supervisor of all intelligence services, was then taken over by Isser Harel, who remained in this position until March 26, 1963. David Ben-Gurion called Harel "Memuneh" (Hebrew ממונה — lit. responsible). He simultaneously chaired the Joint Committee of Intelligence Chiefs and served as Defense and Security Advisor to the Prime Minister. For 11 years, Harel was effectively the number two man in the state, solely responsible for all intelligence services and reporting only to the prime minister[69][70]. At the time Harel joined Mossad, the organization had a staff of 12 people, and by 1963 it had about 1,200.

=== Lavon Affair ===
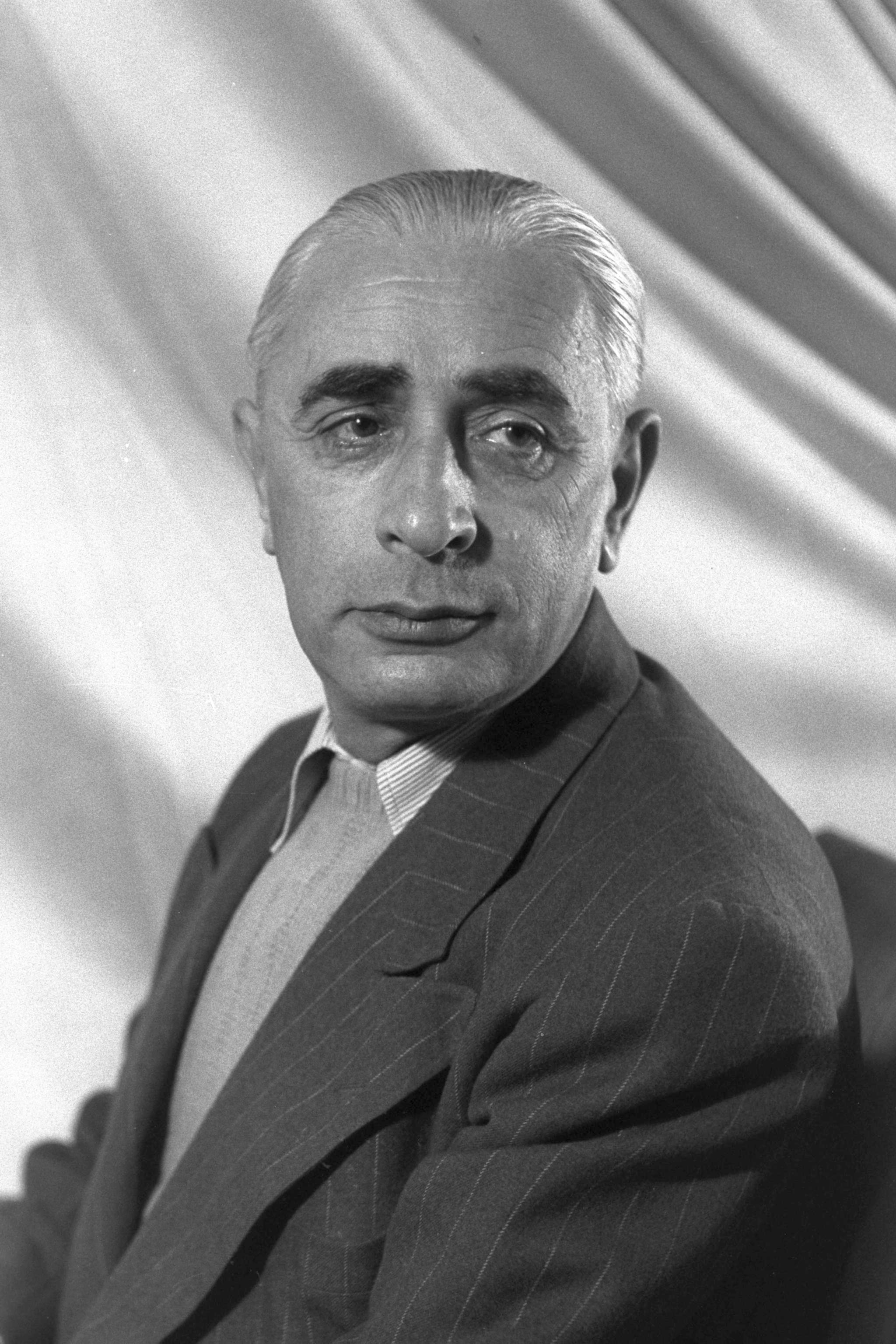
Pinhas Lavon, Israeli Minister of Defense (1954–1955)

In 1954, Military Intelligence organized a failed sabotage operation in Egypt, after which 13 agents were captured. Two committed suicide, two were hanged by an Egyptian court, two were released for lack of evidence, and the rest spent many years in prison.

The result was one of the biggest political scandals in Israel's history, called the "Lavon Affair" or the "Shameful Affair" ("Esek bish"), which lasted intermittently from 1954 to 1964. Military Intelligence chief Binyamin Gibli and Defense Minister Pinchas Lavon blamed each other for the failure. Gibli claimed that he had acted on Lavon's orders, while Lavon denied it, saying that there was no order and that Gibli had gone behind his back. Both eventually lost their positions in 1955, and who was right remains unknown. In 1960 and 1964, on the initiative of Lavon and Ben-Gurion respectively, attempts were made to review the case. The result was conflict within the ruling Mapai party and Ben-Gurion's own resignation.

The failure of Operation Susanna was the occasion for Isser Harel to establish operational units within the Mossad, independent of military intelligence. The Mossad Operations Division was headed by Avraham Shalom and Rafi Eitan, who came with Harel from the Security Service. After the exposure of Avri Elad, a military intelligence officer working for Egypt, in 1958, Harel secured for the Mossad the right to conduct not only intelligence but also sabotage activities.

=== Khrushchev's report ===
One of the most famous operations of the Israeli secret services was the extraction in 1956 of Nikita Khrushchev's secret report to the 20th Congress of the Communist Party of the Soviet Union "On the Cult of Personality and its Consequences". The report was obtained from Poland thanks to a journalist from the PPA news agency, Viktor Grajewski, who gave one of the copies of the document to the Israeli embassy.

Upon reading the report, Ben-Gurion uttered a prophetic phrase that was wrong by a matter of years:

If this is true, in 30 years there will be no Soviet Union.

With David Ben-Gurion's approval, the head of the Shabak at the time, Amos Manor, passed the text of the report on to the CIA's chief of counterintelligence, James Angleton. Engleton, who had served in the European branch of the Office of Strategic Services since 1943, trusted the Zionists, who had been a useful source of information for him during the war. Beginning in 1951, when the CIA entered into a cooperation agreement with Shiloach, Engleton worked extensively with Israeli intelligence. After receiving Khrushchev's report, Engleton became Israel's staunchest ally and most ardent supporter in the American intelligence community.

The KGB never identified who leaked the report to the West.

On June 4, 1956, Khrushchev's report was published in the New York Times with the approval of CIA chief Allen Dulles. Since then, Israel has been able to exchange intelligence information with the CIA.

=== Political assassinations ===
The first so-called "targeted killing" by Israeli intelligence was the assassination on July 13, 1956, of Colonel Mustafa Hafez, the head of Egyptian intelligence in the Gaza Strip, the organizer of many terrorist actions against Israel. Hafez was blown up by a bomb placed in a book given to him. A few days later, the head of Egyptian military intelligence in Jordan, Colonel Salah al-Din Mustafa, was killed in the same way. The operations against them were planned and carried out by the head of Israeli military intelligence, Yehoshafat Harkabi. There is information that David Ben-Gurion was dissatisfied with these "cold-blooded assassinations" and Israel did not carry out "targeted liquidations" for the next 6 years.

The situation changed in the late 1960s and early 1970s, when Israel and Israelis became the target of mass terror by radical Palestinian groups. After the terrorist attack on the Munich Olympics in September 1972, Mossad was ordered by Prime Minister Golda Meir to find and eliminate all those involved. The mission was accomplished, although several innocent bystanders were killed in Lebanon and Norway. The first of the terrorist organizers, Wael Zwaiter was shot dead on October 16, 1972. By June 1973, according to various sources, 12 or 13 of the 17 men on the Mossad list had been killed. The last to be eliminated, Black September leader Salah Khalaf, was killed by his associates in 1991, 19 years after the Munich operation.

Since then, the Mossad and other Israeli intelligence agencies have regularly conducted operations to eliminate leaders of terrorist organizations, including abroad. One of the most famous such operations was the assassination of Fatah military leader Abu Jihad in Tunisia on April 16, 1988, in a joint operation by the Mossad, Sayeret Matkal, and Shayetetet 13 special forces.

An assassination attempt on Saddam Hussein was also planned in 1992 in revenge for rocket attacks on Israel during the Gulf War.

=== Lekem ===
In 1957, another organization appeared in the Israeli intelligence community, the Bureau of Scientific Liaison (Hebrew הלשכה לקשרי מדע, Lishka le-kishrei mada), abbreviated as Lekem. Its creation was linked to Israel's desire to acquire nuclear weapons. The creation of "Lekem" was treated with such secrecy that even the then curator of all intelligence services, Isser Harel, did not know of its existence, and the head of "Lekem" was not a member of the Committee of Intelligence Chiefs and communicated exclusively with the Prime Minister.

Initially, Lekem's mission was to ensure the security and secrecy of the nuclear reactor under construction in Dimona, but later Lekem ensured that Israel obtained the necessary nuclear components, and after 1979 the intelligence service was tasked with extracting information in the field of high technology.

Lekem was headed by Binyamin Blamberg until 1981, and by Rafi Eitan for the next five years.

=== Israel Beer Affair ===
After Amos Manor was appointed Chief of Counterintelligence in 1953, the agency began to focus on espionage by the USSR and its allies. These efforts led to the exposure of a number of agents. Earlier, in 1950, three soldiers had been arrested on charges of spying for Poland; in 1956, a Soviet agent in the Foreign Ministry, Ze'ev Avni; and in 1960, a physics professor working for Czechoslovak intelligence, Kurt Sitta.

Isser Harel was suspicious of left-wingers in general and communists in particular, believing them to be potential agents of the USSR. The case of Colonel Israel Beer, a member of the Mapai party, showed that these fears were well founded.

Colonel Beer was one of the most honored military men in Israel with many awards. He was a military advisor to Prime Minister David Ben-Gurion, served as chief historian of the Defense Ministry, and had access to secret archives. His arrest on April 1, 1961, was the result of eight years of surveillance by counterintelligence on Harel's orders. It turned out that Beer had been recruited in Vienna before coming to Israel and had passed many documents to Soviet intelligence, including a number of pages from Ben-Gurion's personal diary. This was Israel's first case of treason by such a high official. Beer was sentenced to 15 years in prison and died in prison on May 1, 1966.

=== Eichmann's kidnapping ===
In 1960, Israeli intelligence discovered in Argentina the Nazi war criminal Adolf Eichmann, who was in charge of the "final solution of the Jewish question" during World War II and was directly responsible for the extermination of millions of Jews.

Fearing that an open diplomatic request for his extradition might lead to another disappearance, the Mossad, with the knowledge of the Prime Minister, organized the kidnapping of Eichmann and his transfer to Israel. The operation was led personally by Mossad Director Isser Harel. In Israel, Eichmann was tried and sentenced to death. This is the only death sentence imposed and carried out by the Israeli judicial system in the history of the State of Israel, with the exception of the admittedly murderous "kangaroo court" trial of Meir Tobianski on June 30, 1948.

Official recognition that it was Mossad agents and not some "Jewish volunteers" who kidnapped Eichmann did not come until February 2005, and the full list of participants in Eichmann's capture was not published until January 2007.

Eichmann's kidnapping was not the only operation against Nazi fugitives after World War II. According to some estimates, Israeli intelligence eliminated more than a thousand people involved in the realization of the Holocaust. At the same time, there are several cases in which Israeli intelligence officers released former Nazis in exchange for valuable intelligence information.

=== Summary of the period ===
The decade from 1952 to 1962 was known as the "Memuneh Era" in Israeli intelligence, because such a concentration of power in one hand had never been allowed before or since. It was during this period that the intelligence services took on the form in which they are known today: AMAN, Shabak, and especially Mossad became known not only regionally, but also worldwide, through a series of complex and large-scale operations that became public. The period before 1963 is characterized as "pioneering", with an extremely high role of the individual. The intelligence services had no experience and no established traditions, but Israeli intelligence officers persistently searched for ways to achieve the goal and found them. A characteristic feature of this period was the dedication of the personnel to their work.

== 1963—1980 period ==
=== Amit's reforms ===
On March 26, 1963, due to a conflict with Prime Minister Ben-Gurion, Isser Harel, the permanent head of Mossad, who oversaw all the intelligence services, resigned.

External image
- https://www.ljplus.ru/img4/s/h/shaon/shaback2.JPG

Major General Meir Amit, head of Military Intelligence, was appointed as the new director of Mossad, whose leadership style was fundamentally different from his predecessor.

Amit more clearly distributed tasks among the intelligence services, introduced computerization, and organized strategic planning and delegation of authority. Amit's reforms paid off during the Six-Day War, when Israeli intelligence knew almost everything about the enemy that was necessary for victory. Mossad agents Wolfgang Lotz in Egypt and Eli Cohen in Syria made special contributions.

After the war, the intelligence services, especially Mossad and Shabak, were forced to focus their attention on the activities of Palestinian terrorist organizations, especially the Palestine Liberation Organization. By the end of 1967, the West Bank and Gaza Strip were covered with a dense network of Shabak informants, which made it possible to thwart the first attempt at an armed Arab uprising in these territories. In 1972, the Shabak arrested a group of Israeli left-wing extremists, the Matzpen, who were preparing a series of terrorist attacks and sabotage.

In the fall of 1972, due to the growing terrorist threat, the position of Counter-Terrorism Advisor to the Prime Minister was created and filled by the former head of Military Intelligence, Aharon Yariv. In the meantime, there is an entire counter-terrorism bureau within the Prime Minister's Office.

=== Ben Barka Affair ===
By the mid-1960s, Israel had established relations with Morocco, one of the few Arab states to recognize it. This included the establishment of relations between the intelligence services of the two countries. In 1965, King Hassan II of Morocco asked Meir Amit to help capture Moroccan opposition leader Mahdi Ben-Barka in Europe. Under threat of severing Israeli-Moroccan relations, Amit helped lure Ben-Barka from Geneva to Paris, where he was arrested by the French intelligence service SDECE and handed over to Moroccan intelligence. Ben Barka was assassinated in a villa on the outskirts of Paris on November 2, 1965.

The Mossad's involvement in Ben-Barka's kidnapping drew the ire of French President Charles de Gaulle, and had a significant impact on Israeli-French relations. In Israel itself, a public scandal was avoided, but Isser Harel, who was Prime Minister Levi Eshkol's advisor on intelligence and counter-terrorism, demanded the resignation of Meir Amit, with whom Harel had had a strained relationship since 1963. Harel himself eventually resigned, this time finally ending his tenure in the security establishment.

=== Agranat's commission ===
On October 6, 1973, Egypt and Syria unexpectedly attacked Israel, and the Yom Kippur War began, resulting in heavy material and human losses and threatening the very existence of the state.

In 1974, the Knesset established a commission to investigate the reasons for Israel's unpreparedness for the war. The commission, headed by Judge Shimon Agranat, concluded that the army leadership and military intelligence were to blame.

The final report mentioned that Mossad had received timely warning of Egypt's intention to attack Israel on October 6, but the categorical opinion of Military Intelligence that there would be no such attack had a blinding effect on both the Mossad leadership and the country's political leadership.

As a result of the commission's findings, Chief of the General Staff David Elazar, Commander of the Southern Command (Israel) General Shmuel Gonen, Head of Military Intelligence Eli Zeira and his deputy (Head of Intelligence Analysis) Aryeh Shalev were dismissed. Lieutenant Colonel Yoni Bandman, head of the Egyptian sector in AMAN ("Anaf 6"), and Lieutenant Colonel David Gedaliah, who was in charge of intelligence in the Southern Military District, were recommended not to be used in intelligence-related positions. Although the commission's reports blamed the military, Prime Minister Golda Meir resigned in 1974.

After this war, intelligence agencies began to pay more attention to Arab countries and to verify the reliability of the information they received. Another consequence was the "Doomsday Syndrome", when the intelligence did not believe in Anwar Sadat's peaceful intentions until the last minute before the Camp David Accord. On the eve of his visit to Israel in November 1977, the army was put on full alert because of the massive fear in Israel of another surprise attack.

In addition, a Center for Policy Research (Note: Formally, the Center was established as early as 1953, but until November 1973 it existed only on paper, see: Прохоров, 2003, pp. 232-233) was established in the Foreign Ministry to further evaluate intelligence, and in 1999 a National Security Council was established in the Prime Minister's Office as a separate advisory government security body.

=== Summary of the period ===
During this period, Mossad's importance grew dramatically, both as a result of Meir Amit's reforms and the failures and scandals associated with military intelligence. Slang abbreviations became common in the Israeli intelligence community: "BA" for Before Amit and "AM" for After Meir.

The poor performance of military intelligence led to a change not only in the military but also in the political situation. The result of the "Lavon Affair" was the resignation not only of those directly involved in the scandal, but also of David Ben-Gurion himself. The findings of the Agranat Commission led, among other things, to the resignation of Golda Meir's government and became one of the factors that brought the right-wing Likud party, led by Menachem Begin, to power in Israel in 1977 for the first time in the 30 years of the state's existence.

By the late 1970s, the intelligence community had acquired a shabby reputation. A secret CIA report seized from the U.S. Embassy in Tehran in 1979 stated:

Israel's intelligence and security services are among the best in the world. Experienced personnel and a strong technical base ensure their high efficiency; they demonstrate an outstanding ability to collect and analyze information...(Central Intelligence Agency)

== Scandals of the 1980's ==
In general, the credibility and reputation of the Israeli intelligence services suffered considerably in the 1980s as a result of a number of incidents.

=== The Pollard Affair and the Vanunu Affair ===
On November 21, 1985, U.S. Naval Intelligence analyst Jonathan Pollard was arrested in Washington, D.C., and found to be an Israeli spy working for Lekem. Pollard was sentenced to life in prison. All attempts to secure Pollard's release have been met with stubborn refusal by the U.S. government for many years. On November 20, 2015, Pollard was released after 30 years in prison. Following the Pollard story, Israel stated that it renounces any espionage against the United States and categorically rejects any accusations to that effect.

In 1986, Israeli nuclear technician Mordechai Vanunu revealed the secret of Israel's nuclear weapons to the world through the "Sunday Times" newspaper. "Lekem, who was in charge of security at the Dimona reactor, failed to notice that Vanunu had smuggled a camera into the secure facility and spent a long time photographing it. "Shabak, in turn, overlooked the fact that Vanunu had traveled abroad. Vanunu was abducted by Mossad agents in Rome and brought to Israel.

After the Pollard scandal, Lekem was disbanded, its head Rafi Eitan resigned, and Lekem's functions were transferred to other services.

=== Bus 300 ===
In April 1984, there was a major scandal involving the killing of Palestinian terrorist prisoners by Shabak officers.

On April 12, four terrorists hijacked a bus full of passengers traveling on route 300 from Tel Aviv to Ashkelon. The bus was stormed and the terrorists were killed. It was later revealed that two of the four terrorists were shot dead after being neutralized. The investigation also uncovered facts of perjury on the part of senior Shabak officials in the case. This caused a great outcry in Israel and raised the question of regulating the intelligence services.

As a result of the scandal, Shabak chief Avraham Shalom, his deputy Reuven Hazak, and 13 other employees resigned in June 1986. In 1996, Shabak operations chief Ehud Yatom, brother of then-Director of the Mossad Danny Yatom, confessed to the murder ordered by Avraham Shalom.

The investigation into the Shabak's unsavory practices was continued by a government commission headed by retired judge Moshe Landau. It found that the security service systematically used illegal methods, including torture, not only against terrorists, but also against citizens suspected of espionage. Since 1971, Shabak employees had regularly lied in court, and the top leadership knew about it and covered up the lies. Yossef Harmelin, who had headed the Shabak from 1964 to 1974, was called out of retirement and took over the organization again and managed to restore order after a critical personnel situation had developed as a result of scandals and complaints against politicians, judges and journalists.

=== Klingberg Affair ===
In January 1983, the Shabak arrested Marcus Klingberg, who, as deputy director of the Israel Institute for Biological Research in Ness Ziona from 1957 to 1975, passed information on chemical and biological warfare programs to the USSR. Klingberg caused enormous damage to the country's security by undermining Israel's ability to defend itself against weapons of mass destruction. Klingberg's arrest was not revealed until 1991, when he had already been in prison for 8 years. Klingberg is considered the most dangerous Soviet spy in Israeli history. Klingberg was released from prison 15 years after his arrest; he lived in Paris until his death in 2015, receiving a pension as a lieutenant colonel in the Israeli army.

=== Summary of the period ===
Journalists Dan Raviv and Yossi Melman wrote in their book The History of Israel's Intelligence Services:

The citizens of Israel have almost ceased to trust their intelligence services. Instead of sleeping peacefully at night, confident that Mossad, Shabak and AMAN were guarding their peace, Israelis tossed and turned, tormented by nagging doubts. (Dan Raviv, Yossi Melman. A History of Israeli Intelligence)

Gen. Shlomo Gazit, former head of Military Intelligence, argued that during this period "the intelligence services lost their professionalism". At this time, it became clear that exclusive executive control of the intelligence services had negative consequences. In particular, one of the problems was the promotion policy for senior intelligence officers, which, according to political scientist Uri Bar-Joseph, until the early 1980s was always based on party considerations.

== 1990's ==
The problems in the work of the intelligence services that began in the 1980s continued into the 1990s. Failures were particularly frequent in the Mossad, the foreign intelligence service.

=== Mossad's failures ===
In 1991, Mossad agents were arrested in Nicosia while installing eavesdropping equipment in the Iranian embassy. In 1995, Moscow-based Mossad agent Reuven Dinel was arrested while receiving classified documents from former GRU officers.

In 1997, an unsuccessful assassination attempt was made on the head of the Hamas terrorist organization, Khaled Mashal, in Jordan and exposed the deception of Yehuda Gil, who had been deceiving the Mossad for years by feeding it fictitious information from a supposedly recruited Syrian general.

In February 1998, Mossad agent Yitzhak Ben-Tal was arrested in Switzerland while attempting to bug the Iranian mission to the UN.

In the wake of these scandals, Mossad Director Danny Yatom resigned on February 24, 1998.

=== Yitzhak Rabin's assassination ===
The biggest crisis of the decade was the assassination of Israeli Prime Minister Yitzhak Rabin by right-wing extremist Yigal Amir on November 4, 1995. For the Shabak security service, responsible for guarding the country's top officials, it was the most shameful page in the organization's history.

The Shabak leadership presented a version of a lone terrorist whose actions could not have been foreseen, but there is ample evidence that the police and intelligence services received warnings of Yigal Amir's intentions, but for some reason did not take them into account. This led to a number of versions in Israel of a conspiracy whose alleged participants used Yigal Amir "in the dark".

=== Summary of the period ===
The crisis in the work of the intelligence services in the 1980s and 1990s led Israeli society to believe that there was a need for legislative regulation and independent control of their work. In particular, the prominent Israeli political scientist Alek Epstein wrote:

The intelligence services and similar organizations built on absolute secrecy, without a mechanism of regular external control, are doomed to stagnation, and in this regard the numerous failures of the Shabak and Mossad seem more natural than accidental. In our opinion, it is professional organizations that do not have to constantly worry about maintaining their image in the eyes of everyone, but which are under the relentless scrutiny of the print and electronic media, that are best suited to function in crisis conditions. It is likely that such rule by elite structures, open to outside criticism and under the cross-control of other elites, meets the needs of Israeli society today more than any other form of government. (Alek Epstein, Michael Uritsky, Vesti newspaper, Vesti-2 supplement)

These approaches began to be implemented as early as 1999.

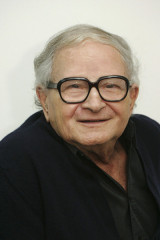
Rafi Eitan, Head of Lekem

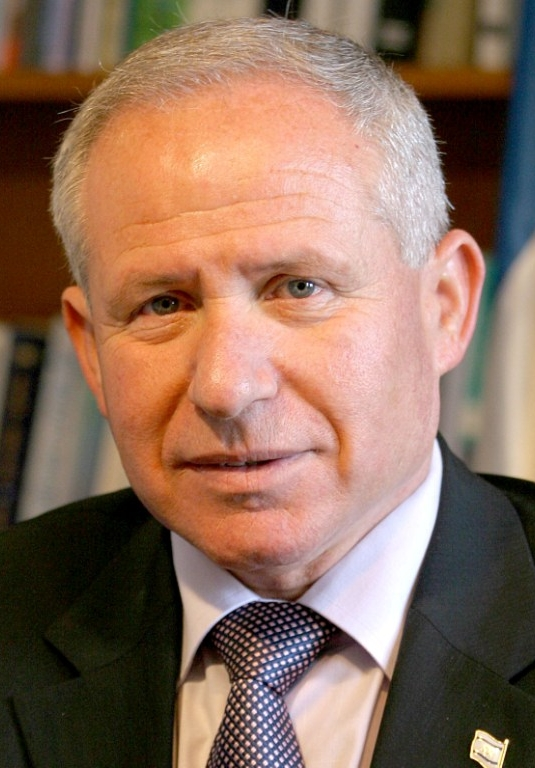
Avi Dichter, head of Shabak (2000–2005)

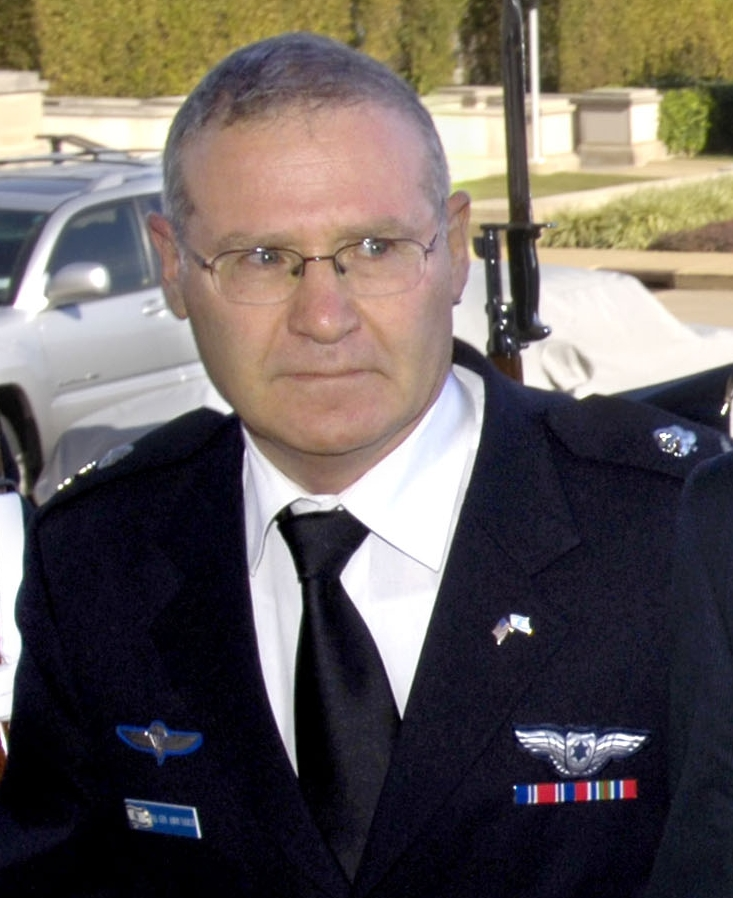
Amos Yadlin, Head of Military Intelligence (2006–2010)

== End of 20th - beginning of 21st centuries ==
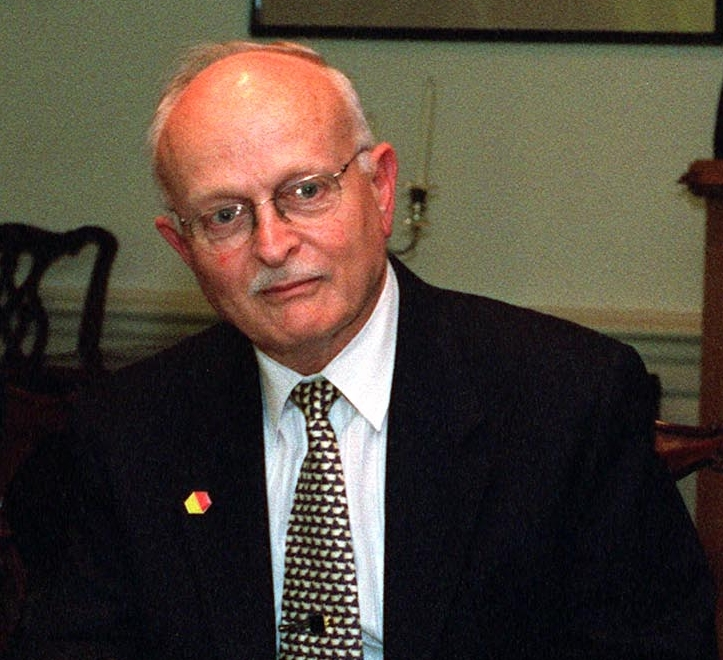
David Ivry, the first head of Israel's National Security Council

Government Resolution No. 4889 of March 7, 1999, established the National Security Council, a central advisory body to the Prime Minister and the Government of Israel on national security matters, within the Prime Minister's Office. Maj. Gen. David Ivri was appointed as the first head of this body. The council's functions include assisting the Prime Minister in formulating and approving decisions, and monitoring their implementation, regarding the work of the intelligence services.

In 1999, for the first time, the Israeli Supreme Court passed a law regulating the activities of the intelligence services, which included a prohibition on torture. Prior to that, the intelligence services operated outside any legal framework, relying solely on internal instructions and directives from the leadership. This tradition had been maintained since the time of David Ben-Gurion, who was opposed to such regulation. On February 21, 2002, the Knesset passed a law to this effect. In 2004, another law was passed with detailed instructions for security officers.

The Mossad, Israel's foreign intelligence agency, has persistently opposed the delivery of advanced weaponry to Arab countries. For example, in 2005, Israel succeeded in disrupting the planned delivery of Russian Iskander-E operational strategic missiles to Syria by organizing a leak of information about the deal, causing the so-called "missile scandal".

The 2006 Lebanon War triggered a fundamental reform of military intelligence. AMAN introduced a new division of analytical teams, a fundamentally new system for analyzing intelligence information, and intensified contacts between extraction units and analysts. The main goal of the reforms, however, is to establish dialogue and interaction between policymakers and intelligence analysts. According to Alexander Kondratiev, a professor at the Academy of Military Sciences, the new system will allow "not only to improve the quality and reliability of intelligence products, but also to present intelligence assessments directly to politicians, which was not the case before.

=== Future tasks ===
==== Iran ====
With the end of Saddam Hussein's regime in Iraq, the main external threat to Israel became Iran, whose president, Mahmoud Ahmadinejad, has suggested "wiping Israel off the face of the earth" or "creating it in Europe, the United States, Canada, or Alaska". Iran funds and arms the Lebanese terrorist group Hezbollah and, according to some experts, is seeking nuclear weapons.

Israeli intelligence was already paying special attention to Iran in the 1990s, when it became known that Israeli navigator Ron Arad, shot down over Lebanon in 1986, had been transferred there. Major General Meir Dagan, who became head of the Mossad in September 2002, began reorienting the Mossad from intelligence gathering to direct action against Islamic fundamentalists and, primarily, Iran. He stated that the Mossad was "an intelligence agency, not the number two in the Foreign Ministry". The Mossad was not the number two in the Foreign Ministry. Although the Mossad did not succeed in completely stopping Iran's nuclear program, it was significantly delayed. The most famous action of the 2010s was the kidnapping and delivery of Iran's so-called "nuclear archive" — 100,000 AMAD Project documents weighing about 500 kilograms — to Israel in 2018.

==== Hamas ====
Since 2000, the disengagement of the Israeli army from the Gaza Strip and the increase in terrorist attacks have created new challenges for the intelligence services, especially the Shabak. The situation became particularly acute after Hamas took full control of the Gaza Strip in June 2007. According to a number of observers, this led to the Gaza Strip becoming "an enclave of anarchy and terrorism". However, thanks to the work of the intelligence services and the police in Israel, about 97% of the planned terrorist attacks are prevented. The high quality of the work of the intelligence services was noted by analysts of the results of the military operation called "Cast Lead" conducted by Israel in the Gaza Strip from December 27, 2008, to January 20, 2009.

==== Terrorism trends ====
On September 27, 2004, the Shabak published a report analyzing data and trends in terrorism in Israel since the beginning of the Second Intifada. The report noted the mass deaths of Israeli civilians as a result of targeted attacks by Islamic terrorists; the involvement of Israeli Arabs, not only residents of the West Bank, and Gaza; the increasing coordination between individual terrorist groups in response to mass arrests of participants by Israeli security services; the continuing role of the West Bank as an ideological and organizational center of terrorism, and the increasing involvement of the Lebanese Shiite organization Hizbullah in terrorist activities.

==== Right-wing extremism ====
A relatively recent problem is right-wing extremism among some of Israel's Jewish population. Its history dates back to the Jewish underground organizations Irgun and Lehi ("Stern Gang") during the British Mandate, known for a number of terrorist attacks against the British and Arabs. Individual right-wing extremist actions occurred in 1983–1984, the most high-profile being the aforementioned assassination of Prime Minister Yitzhak Rabin. One of the most important areas of Shabak activity in the 1990s was to curb the activities of extreme right-wing Jewish groups prone to terrorism.

The rise of this sentiment is linked to the government's failure to fundamentally address security concerns as a result of the Oslo Accords and the unilateral Disengagement Program, as well as unilateral concessions to the Arabs, according to a segment of the Israeli population. In October 2008, Defense Minister Ehud Barak established an interagency unit to maintain order in the settlements of the West Bank and to combat extremism among the settlers.

== Bibliography ==
- Капитонов, К. А. (2005). История Моссада и спецназа. Воюющая страна (in Russian). Восток-Запад. p. 446. ISBN 978-5-17-028779-6.
- Ландер И. И. Палестина // Негласные войны. История специальных служб 1919–1945. — Одесса: Друк, 2007. — V. 1. — pp. 242–248. — 622 p. — 500 copies. Archive: 20 January 2015.
- Ландер И. И. Палестина // Негласные войны. История специальных служб 1919–1945. — Одесса: Друк, 2007. — V. 3. — pp. 62–73. — 530 p. — 500 copies. Archive: 20 January 2015.
- Меир, Г. (1997). Моя жизнь. Воюющая страна (in Russian). Translated by Зерновой Р. Аурика. p. 506. ISBN 978-5-86020-183-5. Archived from the original on 2007-11-09.
- Млечин, Л. М. (2000). Моссад. Тайная война. Секретная папка (in Russian). Москва: Центрполиграф. p. 490. ISBN 978-5-227-00813-8.
- Певзнер Ю., Чернер Ю. (2001). На щите Давидовом начертано "Моссад". Секретные миссии (in Russian). Translated by Зерновой Р. Терра. p. 427. ISBN 978-5-275-00303-1.
- Прохоров, Д. П. (2003). Спецслужбы Израиля. Досье. Спецслужбы мира (in Russian). Translated by Зерновой Р. Олма-пресс. p. 384. ISBN 978-5-7654-2102-4.
- Равив Д., Мелман Й. (2000). История разведывательных служб Израиля. Секретные миссии (in Russian). Translated by Зерновой Р. Международные отношения. p. 528. ISBN 978-5-7133-1021-9.
- Уолтон, К. (2022). Британская разведка во времена холодной войны. Секретные операции МИ-5 и МИ-6. Центрполиграф. ISBN 978-5-04-002078-2. Archived from the original on 2022-10-21.
- Фромер, В. (2003). Солдат в Моссаде // Иерусалимский журнал.
- Adelman, J. R. (2008). The Rise of Israel: A History of a Revolutionary State. Israeli History, Politics and Society. Vol. 10. Routledge. p. 288. ISBN 978-0-415-77510-6.
- Bar-Joseph, U. (1997). "State-Intelligence Relations in Israel: 1948-1997 // Journal of Conflict Studies. — Fredericton". Journal of Conflict Studies. XVII (2). New Brunswick: University of New Brunswick: 133–156. Archived from the original on 2022-08-12.
- Bergman, Ronen (2018). Rise and Kill First, The secret history of Israel's targeted assassinations. New York: Random House.
- Black I., Morris B. (1991). Israel's Secret Wars: A History of Israel's Intelligence Services. Grove Press. p. 634. ISBN 978-0802132864. Archived from the original on 2022-08-12.
- Cohen, H. (2009). Army of Shadows: Palestinian Collaboration With Zionism, 1917—1948. University of California Press. p. 344. ISBN 978-0-520-93398-9.
- Ostrovsky, V.; Hoy, C. (1990). By Way of Deception: A Devastating Insider's Portrait Of The Mossad. Stoddart Publishing Co. Limited. p. 321. ISBN 978-0-7737-2460-0.
- Jeffrey, T. Richelson (1997). A Century of Spies: Intelligence in the Twentieth Century. New York: Oxford University Press. p. 544. ISBN 978-0-19-511390-7.
- Thomas, G. (2007). Gideon's Spies: The Secret History of the Mossad. Macmillan. p. 616. ISBN 978-0-312-36152-5.

== Other sources ==
- Стьюарт, С. (1987). Асы шпионажа: закулисная история израильской разведки = The Spymasters of Israel. New York: Liberty Publishing House. p. 452.
- Pedahzur, A (2013). The Israeli Secret Services and the Struggle Against Terrorism. Columbia studies in terrorism and irregular warfare. Columbia University Press. p. 215. ISBN 978-0-231-51161-2.
- Teveth, Sh. (1996). Ben Gurion's Spy; The story of the Political Scandal That Shaped Modern Israel. Columbia University press. p. 310. ISBN 978-0-231-10464-7.
