= Unit 81 =

Secret technology unit of the Israeli Defense Forces

- יחידה 81 (Yehida Shmone Achat)
- Founded: 1948–present
- Country: Israel
- Allegiance: Israel Defense Forces
- Branch: Military Intelligence Directorate
- Type: Military unit
- Role: Providing technological solutions to operational needs
- Size: Classified
- Part of: Special Operations Division
- Mottos: Knowledge, will, and dedication will make the impossible possible
- Decorations: Israel Defense Prize (41); Chief of Staff Medal of Appreciation (2016)

Unit 81 (Hebrew: יחידה 81, Yechida Shmone Achat, "Unit eight one") is a secret, highly classified technology unit part of the Special Operations Division of the Military Intelligence Directorate, an independent service of the Israel Defense Forces (IDF). The unit focuses on building, supplying, and providing training in cutting-edge technologies to Israeli elite commando forces and spies.

== Achievements ==
According to a 2021 report by the Israeli business newspaper Calcalist in the last decade alone 100 veterans of the unit have founded 50 technology companies having raised US$4 billion with their accumulated valuations surpassing US$10 billion.

== Unit commanders ==
Name	Duration
Haim Ya'ari	1948–1950
Haim Timor	1950–1957
Dan Barli	1957–1959
Uri Sela	1959–1960
Haim Timor	1960–1962
Ori Goren (Greenblatt)	1961–1966
Avraham Arnan	1966–1968
Ori Goren (Greenblatt)	1968–1970
Yossi Langotzki	1971–1975
Yair Reski	1975–1979
Shlomo Tirosh	1980–1985
Moshe Morocco	
Pinhas Buchris	
Ran Shachor	
Oz Liv	1994–1998
Tal Dilian	1998–2002
Shahar Argaman	
Avner Paz Tzuk	2007–2010
Yuval Reina	2010–2013
Ronen Corman	2013–2016
A'	2016–2019
L'	2019–2023
L'	2019–present

== See also ==
- Mossad
- Unit 8200
- Talpiot program
- Havatzalot Program
- Technion – Israel Institute of Technology
