= Nahum Admoni =

Israeli intelligence officer (born 1929)

- נחום אדמוני
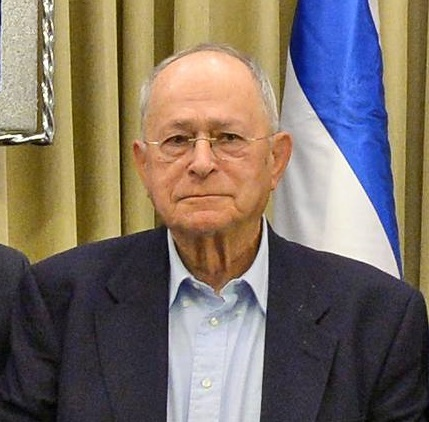
- Born: 21 November 1929 (age 96); Jerusalem, Mandatory Palestine
- Occupation: Director of Mossad
- Espionage activity
- Allegiance: Israel
- Service branch: Mossad
- Service years: 1954–1989

Nahum Admoni (Hebrew: נחום אדמוני; born November 21, 1929) is an Israeli former intelligence officer who served as the Director-General of the Mossad from 1982 to 1989.

Admoni was born in Jerusalem in Mandatory Palestine. His parents, Eliyahu and Sima Rothbaum, were middle-class Polish Jewish immigrants. Growing up, he studied at the Rehavia Gymnasium. In 1946, he enlisted in the Haganah and joined the Third Battalion of the Palmach. He fought in the 1948 Arab–Israeli War in the SHAI, the Haganah intelligence branch, and later in the military intelligence of the newly created Israel Defense Forces. He was discharged from the army in 1950 with the rank of Lieutenant. He then went to the United States and studied international relations at the University of California, Berkeley, returning to Israel in 1954. There he rejoined the Israeli intelligence community, working his way up the chain of command to be Mossad Director Yitzhak Hofi's deputy. In 1982 the designated director of the Mossad Yekutiel Adam was killed in 1982 Lebanon War and Admoni was chosen to replace him.

Shortly after becoming the Mossad Director the Sabra and Shatila massacre occurred. Admoni was criticized by the Kahan Commission for not warning the cabinet before allowing the Gemayel Phalangists into the camps, though no action against him was recommended. During his service as Mossad Director, Admoni watched over the Jonathan Pollard affair, in which it was revealed that Israel (though not the Mossad directly) was spying on the United States. He also endured the revelation of Israeli involvement in the Iran–Contra Affair and the public abduction of Mordechai Vanunu, who had revealed secrets of the Israeli nuclear weapons program to the British press. Admoni retired in 1989.

On August 28, 2006, he was appointed by prime minister Ehud Olmert to be chairman of an investigation committee, charged with investigating the actions of the government during the 2006 Lebanon War.

He is married to Nina Admoni (née Wertans), who was born in Poland, and was among the Jews who fled to China during World War II. She later moved to the United States, and met Nahum while he was studying in Berkeley. The couple married (they have two daughters Yael Lynne and Irit ) and moved to Israel when he returned there. He has served on the board of directors of several companies, including Mossad's pensioners' association.
