= Aharon Ze'evi-Farkash =

Head of Israeli military intelligence

- אהרן זאבי-פרקש
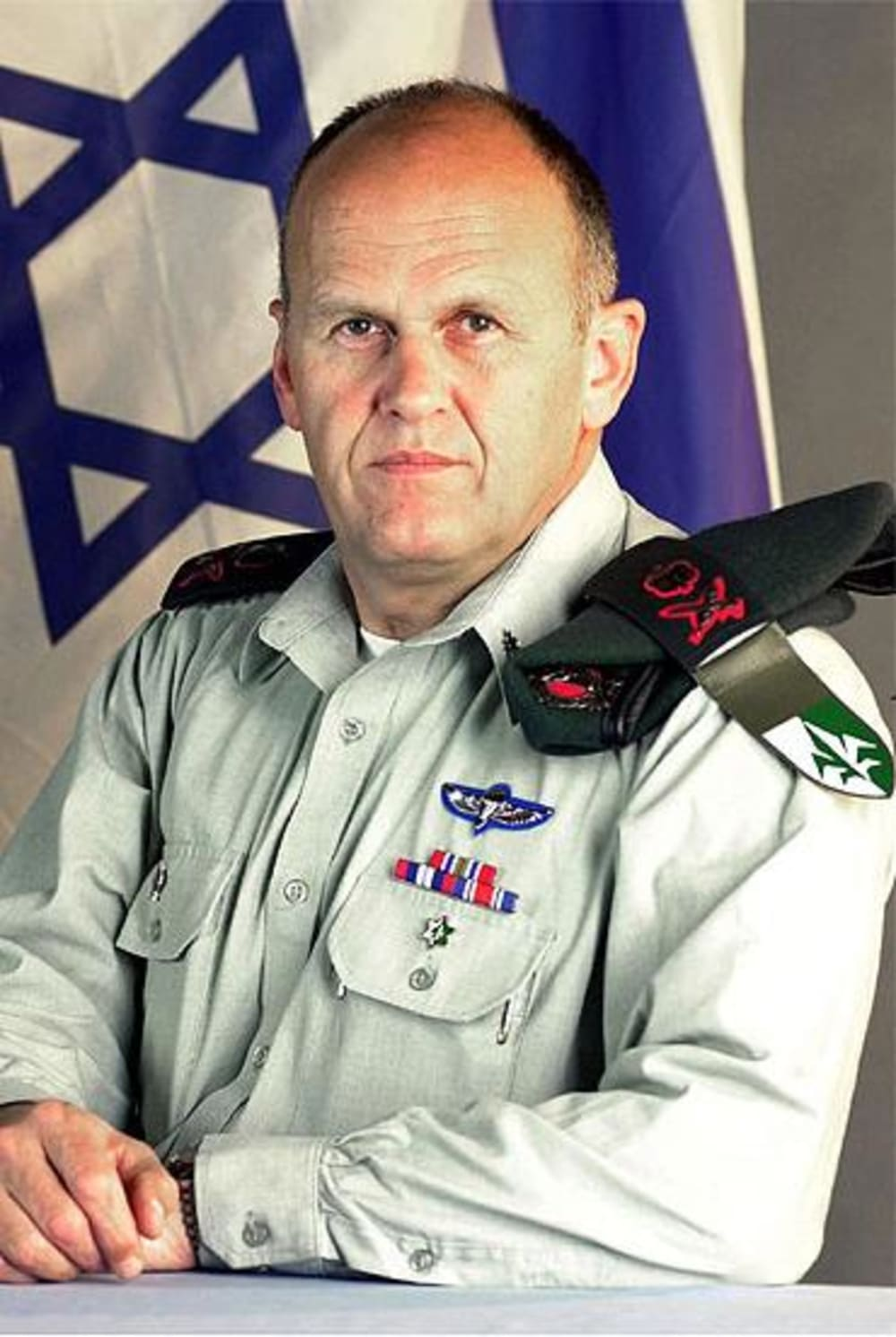
- Aharon Ze'evi-Farkash
- Born: 1948 (age 77–78); Beclean, northeastern Transylvania, Romania
- Education: Tel Aviv University
- Military career
- Allegiance: Israel
- Branch: Israel Defense Forces
- Rank: General
- Commands: Israel Defense Forces Technological and Logistics Branch

Aharon Ze'evi-Farkash (Hebrew: אהרן זאבי-פרקש; born 1948) is an Israeli general. He was the head of the Israeli Military Intelligence Directorate (Aman) from 2002 to 2006.

== Biography ==
Ze'evi-Farkash was born in Beclean, in northeastern Transylvania, Romania. He received a B.A. and M.A. in Middle East and Islam Studies from Tel Aviv University, as well as an AMP/ISMP from the Harvard Business School.

== Military and academic career ==
He commanded the Israel Defense Forces Technological and Logistics Branch and the IDF Planning Branch. He is head of the Intelligence and National Defense Program of the Tel Aviv University's Institute for National Security Studies (INSS).

According to Der Spiegel, before Ze'evi-Farkash's retirement from the military he set up a secret commission to evaluate all available information on the missing Israeli navigator Ron Arad. The commission concluded that Arad died between 1993 and 1997.

== Business career ==
In 2006, Ze'evi-Farkash founded FST21 Ltd. (Farkash Security Technologies), which provided technologies and services for home safety and container security (it was later renamed FST21 Biometrics). FST21 has developed an award-winning building safety and security system that acts as a virtual doorman. In spite of winning several design awards, FTS21 failed to gain a significant market share, and it was folded in 2018.
