= Binyamin Gibli =

Israeli intelligence officer (1919–2008)

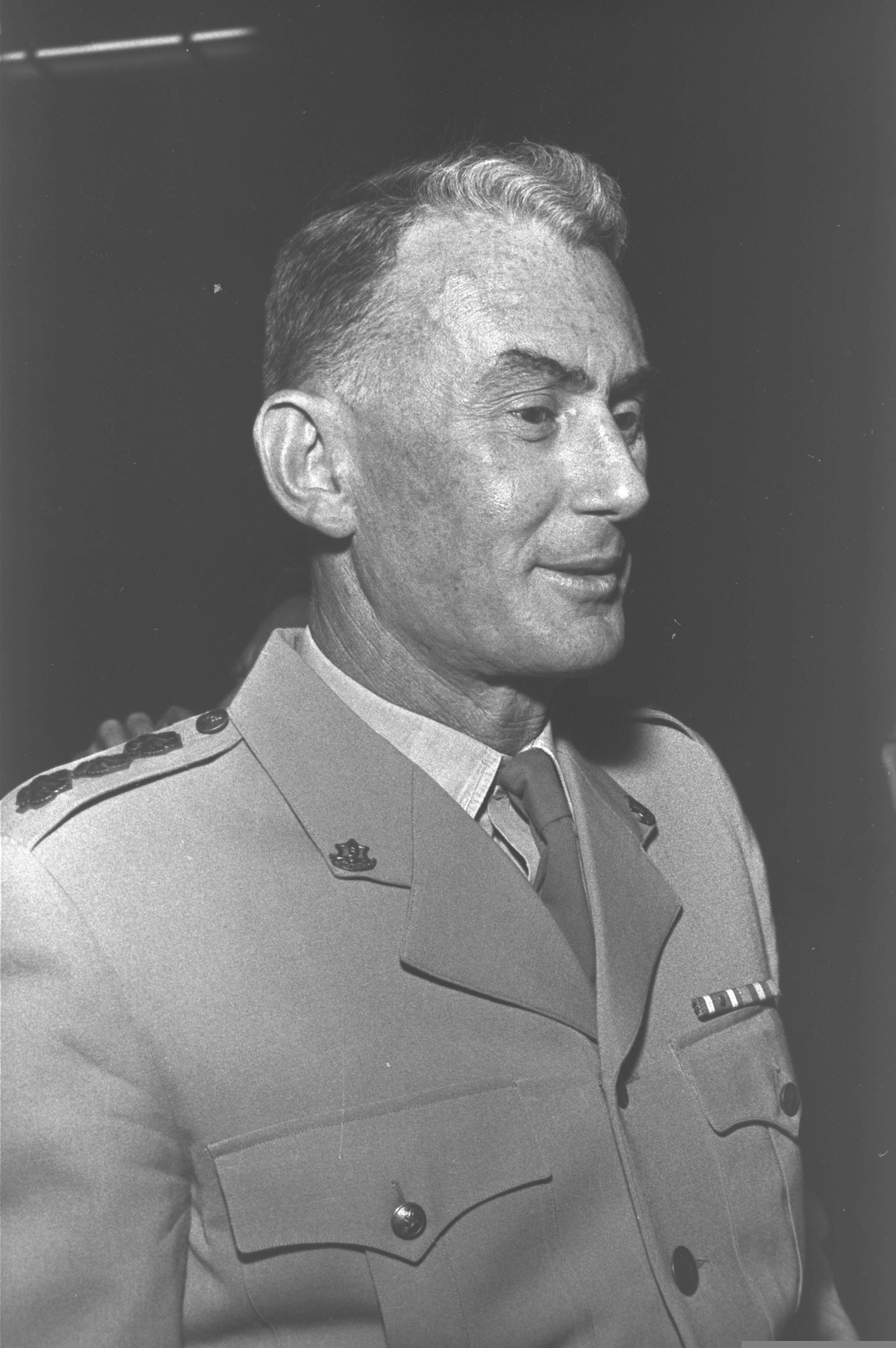
- Gibli in 1959
- Native name: בנימין גיבלי
- Born: Binyamin Gibli; January 1, 1919; Petah Tikva, Mandatory Palestine
- Died: August 19, 2008 Tel Aviv, Israel
- Allegiance: Israel
- Branch: Haganah; Israel Defense Forces
- Service years: 1944–1961
- Rank: Aluf Mishne
- Known for: Lavon Affair, Tobianski Affair

Binyamin Gibli (Hebrew: בנימין גיבלי; January 1, 1919 – August 19, 2008) was an Israeli general who served as the head of Israeli Military Intelligence from June 1950 to March 1955. Gibli was forced to resign in the wake of the Lavon Affair, a failed Israeli operation in Egypt in 1954.

== Biography ==
Binyamin Gibli was born in Petah Tikva in 1919. His father, Moshe Granzia of Briansk, Russian Empire, immigrated to Palestine in May 1914. Granzia settled in Kfar Ganim and changed his name to Gibli. His mother's first name was Yehudit.

Gibli married Esther Pinhassi in 1940 and moved to her family home in Ein Ganim. In 1941 he joined the "Jewish Settlement Police", and the following year completed an infantry officers' course at the training school for Haganah cadres. In 1946 he became a district officer for the Haganah Intelligence Service (SHAI), based in Petah Tikva, with responsibility for the southern region. One of his duties was safeguarding the water pipelines to Jewish settlements.

In March 1948 he was appointed head of SHAI in Jerusalem. On 20 June 1948 he took part in the field drumhead court-martial and wrongful execution of Meir Tobianski at Beit Jiz. Three other SHAI officers were present including SHAI chief Isser Be'eri. Gibli acted as presiding judge, prosecutor, witness and record-keeper. Tobianski, 45 years old, was found guilty of transmitting information to the enemy and a few hours later executed by a Palmach firing squad. On 3 July 1949 David Ben-Gurion issued a public exoneration of Tobianski and restitution of his rank and rights. Four days later his body was re-buried on Mount Herzl. In November 1949, after a trial at which Gibli appeared as a witness for the prosecution, Be'eri was found guilty of manslaughter.

== Career ==
- Member of the Labor sports association Hapoel
- Member of Mapai
- Member of Haganah
- 1941 – late 1944 member of the Jewish settlement police
- October 1946 Joined SHAI as south district officer
- March 1948 Appointed head of SHAI Jerusalem
- 27 April 1948 Assumes SHAI command in Jerusalem
- 30 June 1948 SHAI disbands and Aman inaugurated Gibly appointed as head of MI 1
- 22 February 1953 Takes up study leave in U.S. Harkabi acting Director of Aman
- 28 March 1954 Returns as Director of Aman
- 7 March 1955 Resigns
- 1956 Brigade Commander
- 1957 Chief of Staff, Central Command
- 1960 Military Attache to the United Kingdom and Scandinavia

== Lavon affair ==
Gibli was one of the planners Operation Suzannah, a false flag operation whose objective was to keep the British in the Suez Canal by creating instability through terrorist acts perpetrated against the British, Egyptians and Americans conducted in Egypt in the Summer of 1954. As part of the false flag operation, a group of Egyptian Jews were recruited by Israeli military intelligence for plans to plant bombs inside Egyptian, American and British-owned civilian targets, cinema, library and American educational center. The attacks were to be blamed on the Muslim Brotherhood, Egyptian Communists, "unspecified malcontents" or "local nationalists" with the aim of creating a climate of sufficient violence and instability to induce the British government to retain its occupying troops in Egypt's Suez Canal zone. Egyptian authorities uncovered the plan, which pointed to Israeli involvement. In the wake of the scandal over who actually ordered the operation, known as the Lavon Affair, Gibli was forced to resign, along with Israel's defense minister, Pinhas Lavon.
