= Vera Ducas =

Jewish refugee and alleged informer

- Born: 1912; Austria-Hungary
- Died: 29 March 1948 (aged 35–36); Jerusalem, Mandatory Palestine
- Cause of death: Gunshot wound
- Known for: Alleged informer for the British CID, killed by the Stern Gang

Vera Ducas (1912 – 29 March 1948) was born to a Jewish family in Austria-Hungary. She fled the 1939 Nazi invasion of Czechoslovakia with her husband and child. They lived in Turkey for several years before arriving in Palestine. She did not speak Hebrew and was unable to find work and is alleged to have become an informer for the British CID.

She was kidnapped from one of the main cafes of Jerusalem's Jewish Quarter and her body found on a patch of waste ground, shot through the head. It was reported that the Stern Gang had announced that they had killed her, accusing her of spying for the British.

== See also ==
- Meir Tobianski
- Moshe Kelman
