= Meir Tobianski =

Israeli officer wrongly executed for treason

- מאיר טוביאנסקי
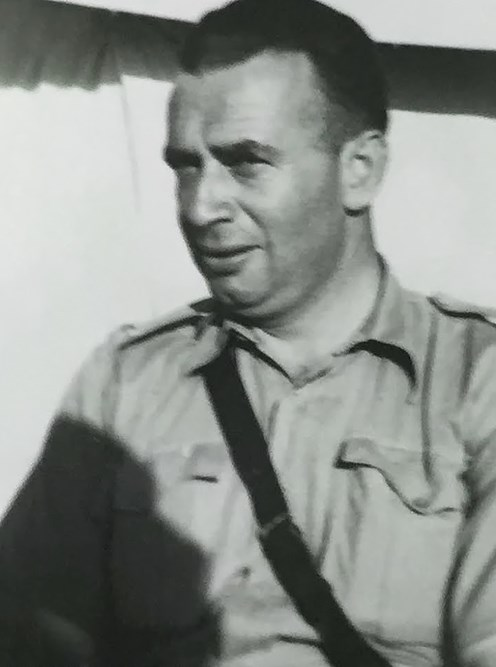
- Born: Meir Tobianski; 20 May 1904; Kovno, Kovno Governorate, Russian Empire
- Died: 30 June 1948 (aged 44); Harel, Jerusalem District, Israel
- Cause of death: Execution by firing squad
- Occupation: Soldier

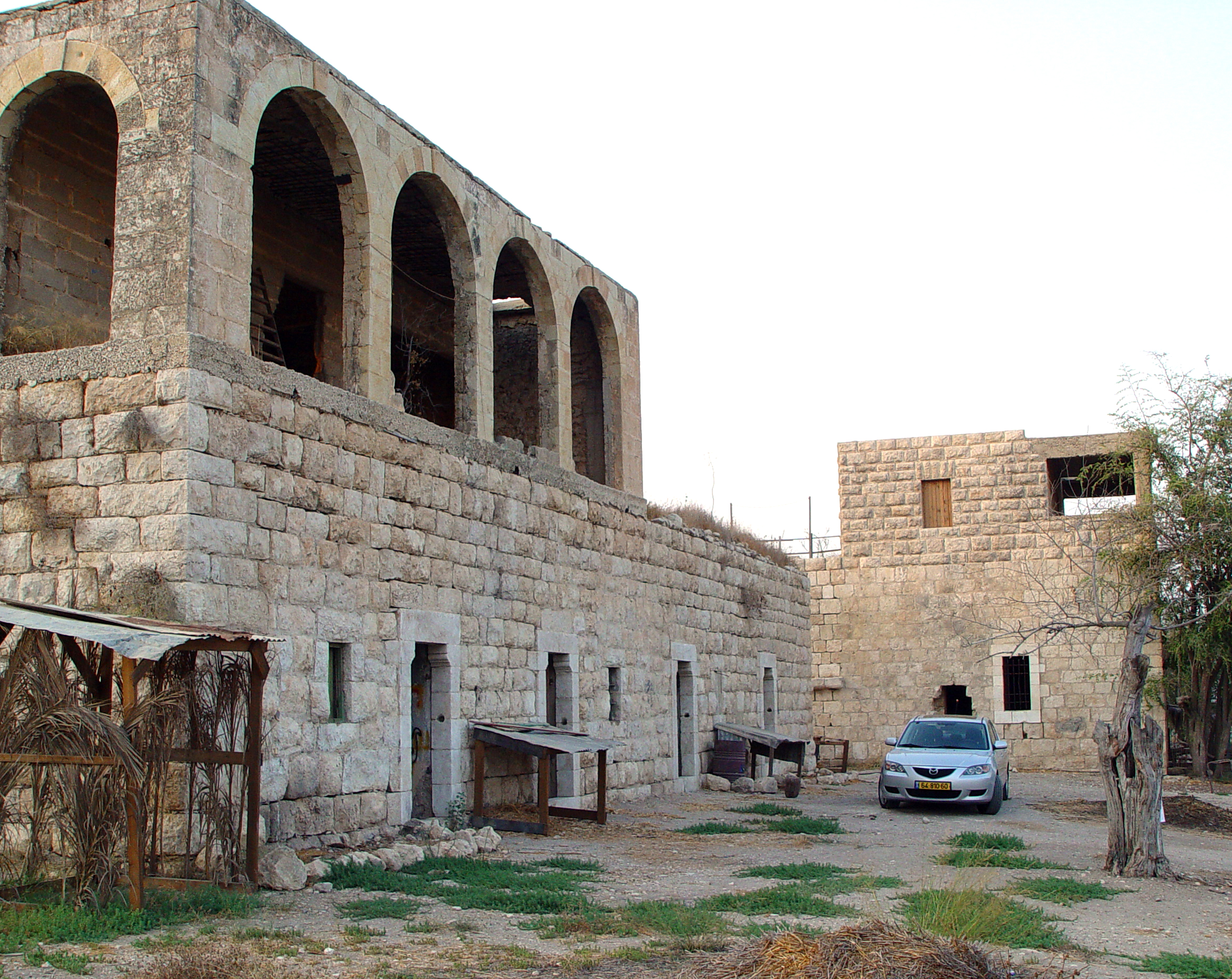
Beit-HaKshatot ("House of the Arches") in Harel, Israel where Meir Tobianski was executed (1948)

Meir Tobianski (Hebrew: מאיר טוביאנסקי, also Tubianski; 20 May 1904 – 30 June 1948) was an officer in the Israel Defense Forces (IDF) who was executed as a traitor on circumstantial evidence on the orders of Isser Be'eri, the first director of the IDF's intelligence branch. A year after the execution, Tobianski was exonerated of all charges.

Tobianski was born in Lithuania and immigrated to Mandatory Palestine in 1925. He served as a major in the British Army during the Second World War, then a captain in the Haganah, and was later sworn into the IDF on 28 June 1948, during the 1948 Arab-Israeli War. He was also the former commander of Camp Schneller, a military base in Jerusalem. In June 1948 Tobianski had been transferred to command of Jerusalem airstrips. He was an employee of the British-run Jerusalem Electric Corporation. Suspected of passing information on targets for Jordanian artillery, he was taken into custody and sentenced to death by firing squad.

== Biography ==
Tobianski was born in Kovno (now Kaunas), Lithuania, then part of the Russian Empire, to a Jewish family in 1904. He grew up in Kovno and Pozsony (now Bratislava) and graduated from the Kovno Hebrew Gymnasium in 1920. He served in the Lithuanian Army and studied engineering in Russia and Lithuania. Tobianski immigrated to Mandatory Palestine in 1925. Initially, he worked in physical labor, including agricultural activities in the fields of Binyamina. After contracting fever while digging a well, he abandoned physical labor and enlisted in the Palestine Police Force. He also joined the Haganah. During World War II, he enlisted in the British Army. He served in the Royal Engineers for 6 years and reached the rank of Major in January 1943. Tobianski was placed in command of the 739th Artisan Works Company. While his unit was stationed in Syria, he carried out secret activities for the Haganah, and while deployed in Italy he assisted Jewish refugees. Tobianski was discharged from the British Army in 1946. After the war, he worked as an engineer with the British-owned Jerusalem Electric Corporation. He served in the Haganah during the 1947–1948 civil war in Mandatory Palestine. During the 1948 Arab-Israeli War he served in the Israel Defense Forces. He was sworn into the IDF on 28 June 1948. He was initially commander of the Schneller Orphanage base. In the summer of 1948, he commanded an airfield near Jerusalem.

Tobianski was married to Chaya and had a son named Ya'akov.

== Background ==
Even prior to the 1948 war, the Haganah had a policy of executing spies and collaborators. In the summer of 1947, Moshe Kelman commanded a Haganah squad which executed a Jew accused of collaborating with the British. The execution took place at Kibbutz Dafna. During the siege of Jerusalem, the reports and fears of spies abounded. Lehi alone had executed four alleged spies in Jerusalem including Vera Ducas, a 36-year-old female Austrian Jew who was shot on 29 March. In June, there was a report that "nine Jewish girls are being held by the [Israeli] Army under suspicion of contacts with the enemy." The apparent accuracy of Jordanian shelling of strategic targets led to suspicions that a spy was responsible. Those suspicions were focused on the Jerusalem Electric Corporation.

On 8 July 1948, the Irgun arrested five British officials of the Jerusalem Electric Corporation. One of the men was Michael Bryant, to whom Tobianski had been accused of passing information. A month later, they were transferred to the Israeli authorities and on 12 August brought to trial. Three, including Bryant, were released due to lack of evidence. The remaining two men, George Hawkins and Fredrick Sylvester, faced a second trial on 16 September. Hawkins, who was charged with passing information to the Arabs, was released on 30 September. Sylvester, who was married to an Israeli and had been a member of the Palestine Police, was charged with espionage and complicity in the Ben Yehuda Street bombing. On 6 October, he was found guilty of three charges of espionage and sentenced to seven years in prison. The verdict rested on his possession of a radio with which he had been communicating with the British Consul in the Old City. In November 1948, he was acquitted by the Israeli Supreme Court and released.

== Drumhead court-martial and execution ==
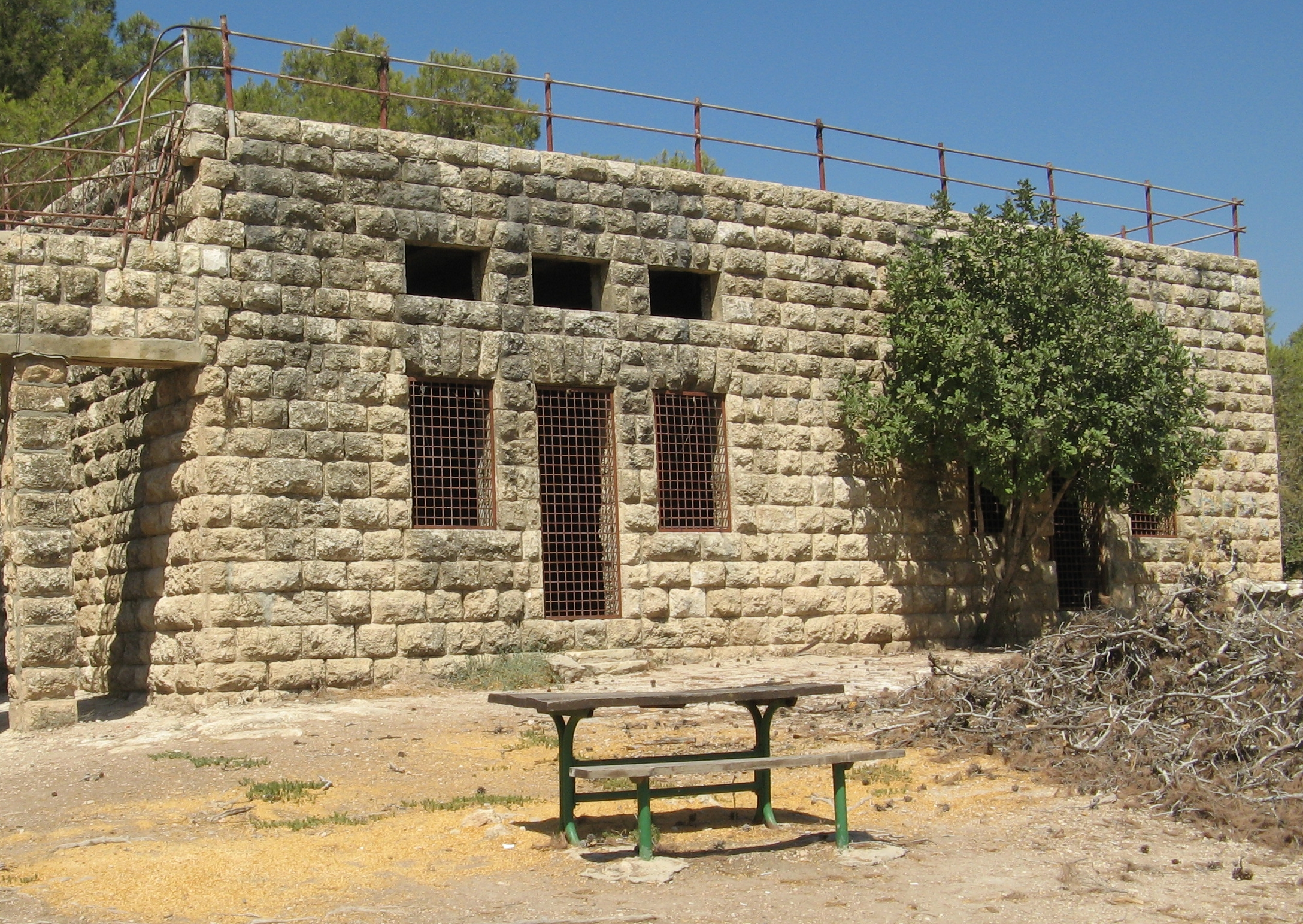
The school building

During the 1948 Arab-Israeli War, in parallel to his military service, Tobianski continued working for the Jerusalem Electric Corporation and had knowledge of the exact location of several arms manufacturers in Jerusalem. These factories had received direct hits from Jordanian artillery.

While shopping in Tel Aviv on 30 June 1948, Tobianski was approached by two soldiers and asked to come with them for an important conference. Contrary to the Chief Military Prosecutor's order to arrest and interrogate Tobianski for 10 days, Tobianski was driven from Tel Aviv to Hulda and then onto a deserted school building between the depopulated former Palestinian Arab villages of Bayt Susin and Bayt Jiz, where he was subject to a drumhead court-martial. During the court martial, Tobianski was interrogated by Isser Be'eri, David Kron, Binyamin Gibli and Avraham Kidron. He was accused of giving a list of important users of electric current, including military bases with radio installations, hospitals, and the offices of the Palestine Post newspaper to his British superiors, who had then passed it onto the Arabs, which had helped guide Arab Legion artillery fire. Tobianski admitted that at his superiors' request and with the approval of his superior officers in the IDF he had drawn up the list but claimed that it had been intended to show which electric current users were to have priority if the city's power supply was limited. He admitted to showing the list of the consumers to Michael Bryant, British manager of the Jewish section of the Jerusalem Electric Corporation, although the list 'vanished'.

Be'eri, who was late for the trial, had already prepared a firing squad of six soldiers from the Palmach Yiftach Brigade, which was in control of the Jerusalem corridor zone.

Tobianski was found guilty and sentenced to death. He was executed in Bayt Jiz, where his body was buried. He had received neither a lawyer nor the right to appeal, and his case was not reviewed by a higher court. At his execution, he refused a blindfold. His last words were "take care of my boy."

== Posthumous inquiry and rehabilitation ==
Several months later, an Israeli Arab by the name of Ali Qasim, who had spied for Israeli intelligence, was found dead in a forest near Haifa. Be'eri was suspected of ordering his execution, on suspicion of being a double agent. Be'eri admitted to the charges in court and was dismissed from his service in the Israel Defense Forces. Due to the efforts of Tobianski's widow, the Military Advocate General ordered Tobianski's case to be reviewed by Military Advocate General Aharon Hoter-Yishai; Tobianski was exonerated by the inquiry.

Among the interrogated was Avraham Gorali, the chief military prosecutor at the time, who claimed that the execution was done without his knowledge. However, the chief military police officer, Danny Magen, stated that Gorali contacted him by phone one day before the execution and asked about the possibility of the Military Police Corps carrying out the punishment, which Magen refused. Gorali admitted to such a call, but the investigation's report stated that this was likely an attempt to assess the possibility of carrying out a death sentence in the IDF, and did not imply knowledge of the outcome of the trial.

On 1 July 1949, a year after Tobianski's wrongful execution, the Israeli government informed his widow of Tobianski's posthumous acquittal and reinstatement to rank. On 5 July, Prime Minister Ben-Gurion publicly exonerated Tobianski. On 7 July, his body was reburied in the IDF's burial grounds on Mount Herzl with full military honors. High-ranking Israeli military officers attended the funeral, and the Sephardic Chief Rabbi of Israel, Benzion Uziel, delivered the eulogy. On his military gravestone is written, "killed by mistake". Ben-Gurion excused Be'eri's actions: "perhaps because the underground laws were still dominant in the army".

Nathan Alterman wrote a protest poem called "The traitor's widow", commemorating Tobianski's widow's successful demand to review his wrongful court martial and damning the euphemism of "quick trial". American novelist Zelda Popkin made Tobianski's execution and posthumous rehabilitation a central episode in her novel, Quiet Street, the first fictional account of the 1948 Arab-Israeli War, published in 1951. In the novel, he appears as "Yora Levine."

== Be'eri's trial ==
In November 1949 Isser Be'eri was tried and found guilty of manslaughter by the Tel Aviv District Court. The examining magistrate, Eliezer Malchi, who conducted the preliminary inquiry, said there were grounds for arraigning Colonel Be'eri on a murder charge but this would not be done. The civilian court found that, as there was a ceasefire in effect at the time, any information supposedly passed by Tobianski could not have served the Jordanian artillery. Due to his extensive service to the country, Be'eri received a symbolic punishment of one day of prison, "from sunrise to sunset, 30 days after sentencing", before which he was pardoned by the president, Chaim Weizmann.

Be'eri's three fellow interrogators, David Kron, Binyamin Gibli and Avraham Kidron, who also had condemned Tobianski as his judges in the afternoon drumhead court-martial, themselves were not charged and tried in court. They reached high military and civilian positions. In his memoir David Kron wrote that despite the official investigation, he was convinced that Tobianski had been guilty and that Be'eri had the full authority to act the way he had. Later Shabtai Teveth placed the fault with Gibli's overbearing ambitions and manipulation, personal traits that led to the Lavon affair.

== See also ==
- List of miscarriage of justice cases
- Timothy Evans
- Vera Ducas, Jewish woman killed by Jewish terror group during the 1948 Jerusalem siege
