= Havatzalot Program =

Elite program in the Israel Defense Forces

Havatzalot Program Official Logo

The Havatzalot Program (Hebrew: תכנית חבצלות) is an elite program in the Israel Defense Forces, aimed at training highly skilled intelligence officers for key roles in Israel's Military Intelligence Directorate, also known as Aman. Havatzalot's cadets complete a full three-year bachelor's double major degree at the Hebrew University of Jerusalem. The first major is a unique compilation of different courses in Middle Eastern studies, political science and sociology. The cadets are free to choose their second major from the following options: Mathematics, Philosophy, Computer Science and Economics. In addition to academic studies, the cadets go through rigorous military and intelligence training, including visits to various IDF units, combat recruit training and officers' course. The three years of training are followed by six years of service in key positions in Aman. The Havatzalot Program is Aman's flagship program and is regarded as one of the most prestigious programs in the IDF.

== Selection ==
=== Suitability to Havatzalot program ===
Suitability to the Havatzalot program is tested and evaluated in several aspects. First, the candidates must be curious and have an interest in current events and issues on the security agenda of the State of Israel. Second, they are required to have strong academic skills and to be outstanding students in high school. In addition, they must have advanced interpersonal skills and leadership potential. This is due both to the intensive nature of the training program and to the nature of the subsequent positions, in which graduates are required to command teams in a variety of different collaborative, and often highly intensive frameworks.

Candidates for the Havatzalot program are required to have a "quality group" rating (one of the primary screening tools for candidates for service in the IDF) of 56, and a primary psychotechnical rating (a grade given by the IDF and the Israel Police to candidates for recruitment, which is supposed to reflect the candidate's intellectual ability, based on a series of psychometric tests) of 90 - the highest possible grades in both categories.

=== Screening ===
The selection process includes:

1. Cognitive tests (as part of the Shkhakim-Havatzalot tests) – which test: general knowledge, logic, programming, languages, mathematics, etc.
2. Explanation conference - The explanation conference is designed to acquaint the candidates with the training of Havatzalot in an in-depth and detailed manner. As part of the conference, the candidates meet with graduates and cadets of the program, and are given the opportunity to ask them questions directly.
3. Group dynamics tests - during which the candidates are tested on team work, work under stressful conditions, their ability to analyse complex information and draw logical conclusions and more.
4. Personal interview - a personal interview will be conducted in the presence of an intelligence officer who is a graduate of the program and a "Selection" (IDF's intelligence H.R. selection branch) officer.
5. Psychologist Day - the candidate is required to undergo several personal psychological tests, including an interview with a psychologist whose purpose is to examine his suitability for service in the Intelligence Corps in general and in the Havatzalot program in particular.
6. Officer examinations - the program graduates attend IDFs officers' course, and therefore many of the candidates undergo officer tests at the Tel Hashomer base, if necessary.
7. Security clearance - all candidates undergo a rigorous background security check to assess their suitability for exposure to classified information, in accordance with the information security procedures in Military Intelligence.
8. Admission requirements for the university - In addition to these stages, the candidates must meet the Hebrew University requirements for a bachelor's double major degree, according to the majors of choice. Additionally, the candidates must receive a mark of 650 or higher in the Psychometric Entrance Test.

== Training course ==
The Havatzalot training program is one of the longest and most prestigious in the IDF, and provides the students with the knowledge, intellectual skills and values required to excel in their future positions. Each year approximately 56 trainees are accepted into the program. The program is 36 months long, and most of it takes place in closed base conditions in the program's compound in the Hebrew University. All the terms of service and training content, including tuition fees for the academic degree, are fully funded by the IDF. All the officers involved in the training are themselves graduates of the Havatzalot program. The Havatzalot training focuses on four main fields: academia, military, intelligence, and values.

=== Academic training ===
The students complete a bachelor's degree in an expanded dual-disciplinary program at the Hebrew University. The first major combines Middle Eastern Studies, International Relations and Sociology, and is identical for all cadets. It provides students with a broad knowledge base on the history of the Middle East, Arab society and language, and regional and international political systems. The second major is chosen by the cadets from the following options: computer science, economics, mathematics, and philosophy.

=== Military training ===
Havatzalot's military training begins with basic training, and continues with officers' course. The military training also includes a series of internal courses, during which the program's cadets learn about the army's activity, with an emphasis on Aman and the many disciplines within it.

The cadets complete an extended basic training in Nitzanim, which includes basic combat training. This is done in order to help familiarize the cadets with bodies outside Aman and give them a broader understanding of combat.

At the end of the first year of training and before the beginning of the second year, the program cadets complete the officers' training course at Training Base 1 (Bahad 1). The program graduates receive their officers' ranks at the end of the three-year training period.

=== Intelligence training ===
The intelligence training is multidisciplinary and is intended to provide graduates of the program with knowledge and skills relevant to all the different organizations within Aman.

The cadets learn the intelligence profession parallel to their academic studies. The intelligence training encompasses the research disciplines in Aman and the other intelligence bodies in Israel, alongsideskill development in all of the relevant fields of collection, data analysis and more.

Every subject has its own course, including examinations and exercises spread over the three years of training. In addition, they include excursions and annexations to field units, exercises and tours of various units throughout the army and security community.

At the end of the second year of training, each trainee receives a research project of one month in one of the Military Intelligence organizations, at the end of which the trainee presents his findings to senior personnel in the Corps. The project enables the trainees to hone their skills with real work outside the framework of the training facility.

=== Moral leadership training ===
In order to prepare them for the responsibility of managing important projects and large groups of soldiers during their service - the training also emphasizes the development of the leadership skills. This training includes theoretical content as well as learning through experience. For example, the program relies almost entirely on the cadets to run the day to day of the facility, from content creation to logistics. The third-year trainees manage the trainees in the first and second years and are entrusted with their personal development and the general functioning of the training complex. In this way the trainees gain work experience, under the close supervision of the program's staff which consists of about a dozen officers at the rank of Captain and Major.

== Service ==
During the third year of training, the cadets receive placements in an orderly process, managed by the head of the program, in which the student's preferences are examined, along with his abilities and his suitability for the position (according to the assessment of his commanders). At the end of the placement process, the position for the first two years of permanent service is chosen, out of the six years of graduates' careers.

The graduates are assigned to important and central positions only within the greater intelligence community and its various bodies, including the Military Intelligence Research Division, the Special Operations Division, the various intelligence units in the IDF (8200, 9900 and more), the intelligence units in the regional commands and divisions, in the Israel Air Force intelligence and in the navy intelligence.

At the end of their training the graduates are granted the rank of "segen" (lieutenant), and after two years they receive the rank of "seren" (captain). Graduates who wish to continue their service in the corps beyond the initial commitment (six years) and who prove themselves capable are granted the rank of "rav-seren" (major) often during the initial permanent service.

The graduates' service in the corps includes a major emphasis on transition – gaining experience in a variety of research disciplines, and a broad understanding of the greater intelligence community and its needs. As a result, most of the graduates switch to an entirely new unit every two years and gain extensive experience in a variety of different intelligence activities (a feature that is considered unusual in the intelligence corps).

Another major component of the graduates' service is the connectivity that exists between the graduates - an unmediated connection between graduates of the same year, or from different years, which are spread throughout the corps, enabling creative partnerships, breaking down bureaucratic walls and promoting innovative collaborations.

== See also ==
- Psagot program – An elite IDF excellence program specializing in research and development.
- Talpiot program - An elite program in the Israel Defense Forces.
- Recruit training in the Israel Defense Forces – Basic training in the Israeli military
- Unit 8200 – Intelligence unit of the Israel Defense Forces
