= Israeli intelligence community =

Intelligence organizations of Israel

The Israeli intelligence community (Hebrew: קהילת המודיעין הישראלית) is made up of Aman (military intelligence), Mossad (foreign intelligence) and Shin Bet (domestic intelligence).

== Current agencies ==
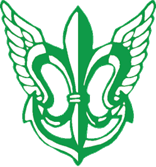
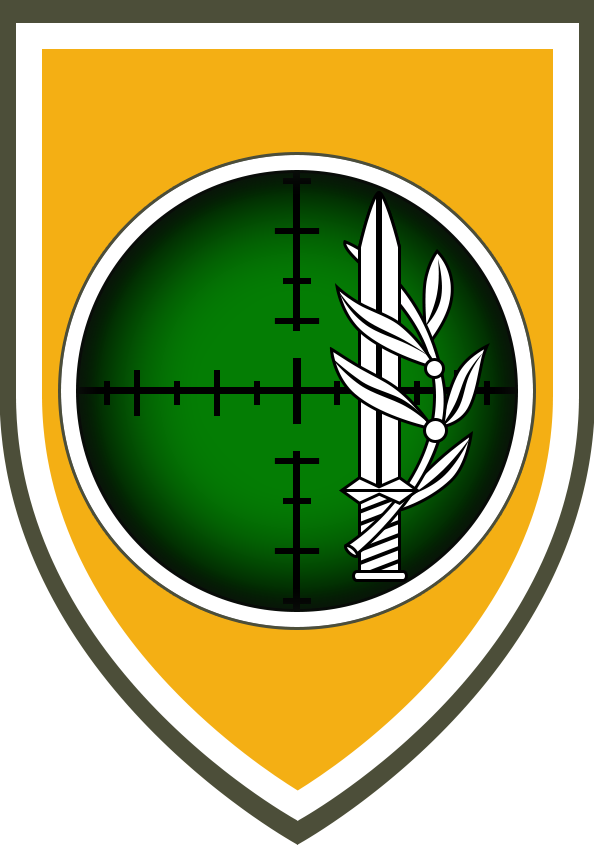
Symbol	Organization	Purpose
=== Military Intelligence Directorate (Aman) ===
	Intelligence Corps	The main intelligence-collection and -analysis body of the IDF General Staff; also includes the Israeli signals-intelligence agency known as Unit 8200
	Information Security Department	The main information-security and counterintelligence unit of Aman
	Research Department	The main all-source intelligence-assessment unit of Aman
	Air Intelligence Directorate	The intelligence unit of the Israeli Air Force
	Naval Intelligence Division	The intelligence unit of the Israeli Navy
	Combat Intelligence Collection Corps	The intelligence unit of Israeli Ground Forces
	Sayeret Matkal	The IDF's premier special-forces unit, directly subordinate to Aman
=== Prime Minister's Office ===
	Mossad	The agency responsible primarily for foreign-intelligence work
	Shin Bet (Shabak)	The organization charged with maintaining internal security, including in the Israeli-occupied territories
=== Israeli Police ===
	Investigations and Intelligence Division	The central body in the police that is responsible for gathering intelligence in the fields of fighting terrorism and crimes.
=== Ministry of Foreign Affairs ===
	The Center for Political Research	A research and assessment body of the Ministry of Foreign Affairs that focuses on the countries and issues that stand at the center of Israel's political-diplomatic activity

== Former agencies ==
- Nativ: the organization responsible for bringing Jews from Soviet Bloc countries, a later manifestation of the Mossad Le'aliyah Bet. Following the dissolution of the Soviet Union in the 1990s, it moved out of the intelligence community and became a department within the Prime Minister's office.
- Lekem: the agency responsible for obtaining and securing secret technology. It was dissolved in 1986, and its director, Rafi Eitan, resigned over the exposure of Jonathan Pollard, whom a United States court convicted of spying for Israel.

== Parliamentary supervision ==
Parliamentary supervision over the intelligence community is undertaken by the Subcommittee for Intelligence and Secret Services, a subcommittee of the Foreign Affairs and Defense Committee, which supervises the entire Israeli Security Forces.

== Structure and organization ==
The issue regarding the suitable structure of the IIC, and questions as to dividing responsibilities and jurisdictions between Aman, Shabak, and Mossad, as well as the format of work for the three in relation to prime ministers and ministers, all of these became agenda issues many times in the past. Various commissions and individual inspectors were appointed throughout the years, whether due to traumatic experiences or as a matter of routine, in order to examine the issues and propose recommendations. These were:

- The Yadin-Sherf Commission (1963)
- The Agranat Commission (1973–1974)
- The Zamir Commission (1974)
- The Commissions of Aluf Aharon Yariv (1984, 1986)
- The commission to investigate the intelligence network following the War in Iraq (2004)

The government was tasked with the matter on a number of occasions and arrived at various decisions. The State Comptroller made the issue his agenda and submitted to the Knesset his findings and conclusions. In 1994, the Subcommittee for Intelligence also examined the questions and brought its recommendations before the Prime Minister.

The division of labour among the intelligence arms, Aman, Shabak, and Mossad, in the current structure of the IIC, is usually established upon a geographical basis. There are interfacing and overlapping segments, often rather wide, among the organizations. The level of coordination and inter-regional cooperation has suffered in the past from fundamental shortcomings, which has hindered the effectiveness of intelligence work on several fronts. The organizations repressed the necessity for the mutual sharing of intelligence information and in synchronizing some activities.

There are still open-ended issues remaining to be discussed, including disputed ones, as to the division of jurisdictions and inter-regional sectoral boundaries. In a document known as the "Magna Carta," the heads of the three services continue their attempt to arrive at agreements regarding these. The Intelligence Subcommittee follows this discourse and examines the steps required to practically settle key areas of dispute. If needed, the Subcommittee could become actively involved in the matter so as to ensure appropriate and reasonable standards for overall intelligence work in Israel.

== Role of Aman ==
The historical development of the IIC destined Aman with a range of activities and tasks that are conventionally outside the realm of military intelligence in the West, such as the responsibility for intelligence research in political matters and other markedly non-military affairs. This largely followed from the reliance by the State of Israel during its first years on the IDF as an anchor and mechanism to fulfill national tasks, it being a system with organizational capacities, resources, and available human resources. As such, Aman has assumed functions which ordinarily would be handled by other intelligence agencies. Accordingly, some critics say, there is a need to reexamine the position and placement assumed by intelligence bodies within the current structure, and transferring certain strategic and political areas and non-military ones, from Aman to a civilian intelligence authority.

== Reforms ==
The commission to investigate the intelligence network following the War in Iraq maintained that, notwithstanding the historical consolidation behind the current IIC structure, and despite the advantages gained by Aman's Research Department and Unit 8200 during many years of service, it is finally time to restructure the IIC in accordance with a proper work distribution, professional designation, as well as a correct constitutional and legal frame of reference.

The Commission recommendations on reforming the current IIC structure, ending up with three or four independent intelligence services, alongside the National Security Council, with the distinction between them being based upon the respective spheres of responsibility of each service:

- Aman (IDF): Its jurisdiction is to consist primarily of "military intelligence"—alerting the political leadership and the security arms to the possibility of war and estimating the means of the enemy, and identifying prospective targets during a war or a limited military conflict.
- Mossad: It is to be charged with, in addition to foiling attacks, a strategic-political emphasis, which includes evaluating the stability of regimes, and engaging in industrial-scientific-technological and nuclear-related intelligence as well as against global terrorism.
- Shabak: It is to be tasked with the security of the State, its citizens, and organs, against Palestinian and other forms of terrorism, and against internal subversion.
- National Security Council: It is to evaluate global conditions according to overall intelligence, and preparing national and security responses.
- SIGINT service: This proposed service would supply all the other services with SIGINT intelligence.

== See also ==
- Australian Intelligence Community
- Indian Intelligence Community
- Pakistani Intelligence Community
- Russian Intelligence Community
- United States Intelligence Community
