= Isser Be'eri =

Israeli spy chief (1901 - 1958)

- איסר בארי
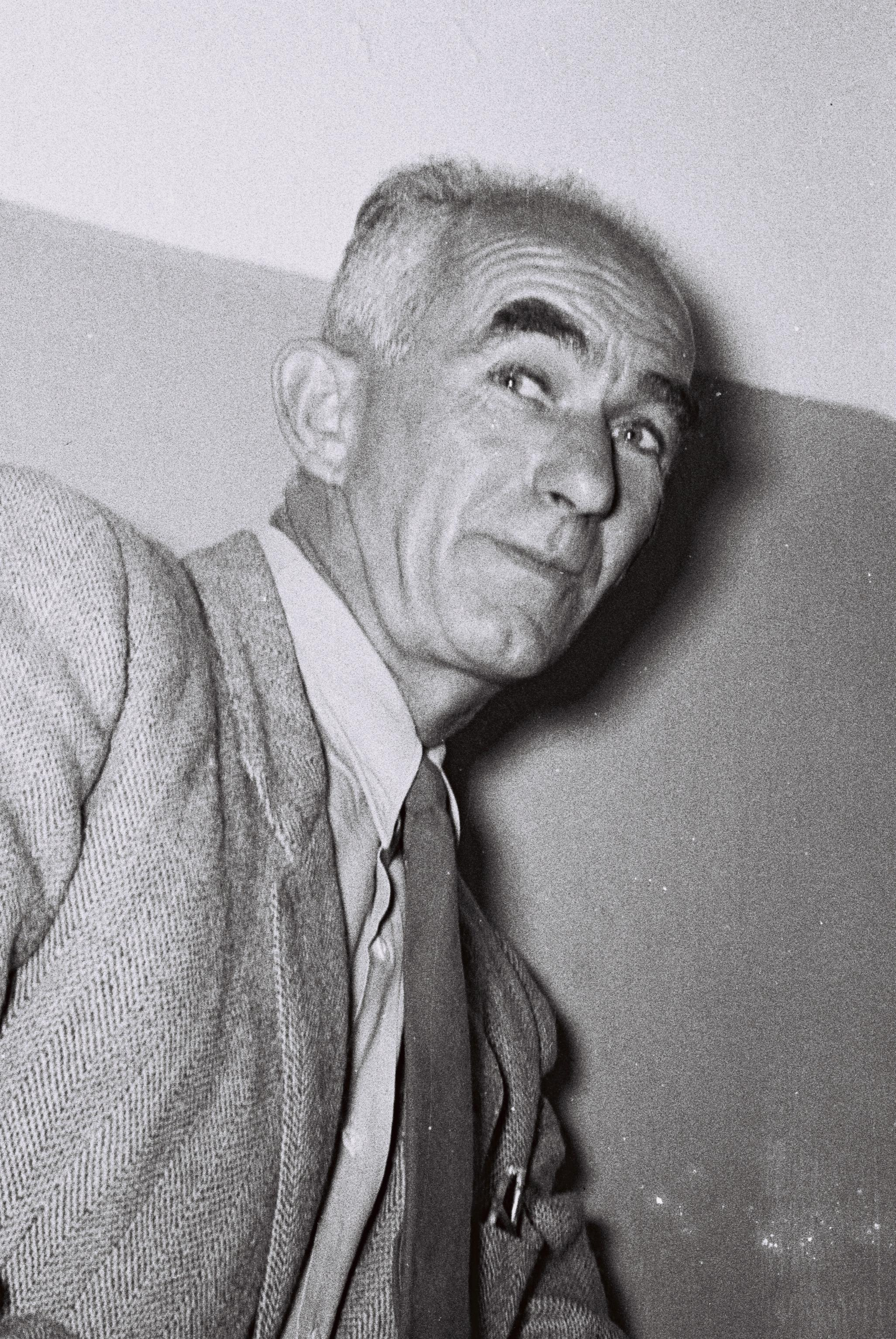
- Isser Be'eri in 1949

Head of the Israeli Military Intelligence Directorate
- In office 30 June 1948 – 3 July 1949

Personal details
- Born: Isser Birenzweig; 1 January 1901 Będzin, Russian Empire
- Died: 30 January 1958 (aged 57) Israel
- Nickname: Big Isser

Isser Be'eri (Hebrew: איסר בארי, born Isser Birenzweig; 30 January 1901 – 1 January 1958) was the director of the Haganah Intelligence Service in Israel and was responsible for helping to reorganise Israeli intelligence services in 1948, as well as ordering the execution of Meir Tobianski, who had been convicted of treason but was later found to have been innocent. He was the founding director of the Israeli Intelligence Department (between 1948 and 1949), which later became the Military Intelligence Directorate.

== Biography ==
Born Isser Birenzweig in Radomsko in the Russian Empire (today in Poland), Be'eri was one of a group of young men known as the "Six from Bedzin", who were later the founders of Migdal. Be'eri emigrated to Palestine in 1921 and became a member of Kibbutz Artzi. He worked in construction until 1938. Between 1944 and 1945 he managed Israel Military Industries, and from 1946 to 1947 managed the Na'aman factory.

=== Haganah intelligence ===
Be'eri joined the Haganah in 1938 and was in its work battalions, before becoming commander of the Kfar Giladi region. In 1947 he joined Shai, and in February 1948 was appointed its head.

On 30 June 1948 Shai was disbanded as part of a reorganization of the Israeli secret service. Three agencies were created: Shin Bet (Shabak), Mossad and Military Intelligence Directorate, with Be'eri appointed the Director of the latter.

=== Tobianski drumhead court martial ===
Meir Tobianski was a Major in the British Army during the Second World War and was a captain in the Haganah. During the 1948 Arab–Israeli War, Tobianski was working for the Jerusalem Electric Corporation and had knowledge of the exact location of several arms manufacturers in Jerusalem. These factories had received direct hits from Jordanian artillery.

On 30 June 1948, Tobianski was taken into custody and interrogated by Be'eri, David Kron, Binyamin Gibli and Avraham Kidron during a drumhead court-martial. Be'eri had already prepared a firing squad consisting of six soldiers from the Palmach Yiftach Brigade, which was in control of the Jerusalem corridor zone. Tobianski was found guilty and executed in Bayt Jiz, where his body was buried. Tobianski had received neither a lawyer nor a right to appeal, and his case was not reviewed by a higher court. Be'eri knew of his innocence, but still ordered his execution.

On 3 July 1949, David Ben-Gurion issued a public exoneration of Tobianski and restitution of his rank and rights. Following Tobianski's posthumous rehabilitation, Be'eri was forced to resign as chief of military intelligence. In November 1949, Isser Be'eri stood trial in the Tel Aviv District Court for Tobianski's wrongful execution. The civilian court found that, as there was a ceasefire in effect at the time, any information supposedly passed by Tobianski could not have served the Jordanian artillery. Be'eri was found guilty of manslaughter and given a symbolic punishment of one day of prison, "from sunrise to sunset, 30 days after sentencing", before which he was pardoned by the president, Chaim Weizmann. Be'eri reportedly left the trial a broken man and ensconced himself in his home until his fatal heart attack in January 1958.

Be'eri's three fellow interrogators, Binyamin Gibli, David Kron and Avraham Kidron, who also were Tobianski's judges in the afternoon field court-martial, were not charged and tried in court. Later they reached high military and civilian positions. Gibli, who had acted as presiding judge, prosecutor, interrogator, witness and record-keeper in Tobianski's court martial, also appeared as a witness for the prosecution in Be'eri's trial. In his memoir, David Kron wrote that despite the official investigation, he was convinced that Tobianski had been guilty and that Be'eri had the full authority to act the way he had. Later Shabtai Teveth placed the fault with Gibli's overbearing ambitions and manipulation, personal traits that led to the Lavon affair.

== See also ==
- 1948 Arab–Israeli War
- Israeli Security Forces
