= Air Intelligence Group =

Unit of the Israel Air Force

- להק מודיעין
- Logo of the Unit
- Country: Israel
- Allegiance: Israel Defense Forces
- Branch: Israeli Air Force
- Type: Intelligence agency
- Role: Intelligence gathering
- Nickname: Lamdan

Commanders
- Current commander: Amir Gat

The Israeli Air Intelligence Group (Hebrew: להק מודיעין, romanized: Lahak Modi'in; also known as Lamdan, its Hebrew acronym) is a unit of the Israel Defense Forces Air Force. Like other IDF intelligence gathering bodies, it is professionally subordinate to the IDF's Intelligence Directorate.

Lamdan is responsible for the formulation of the aerial intelligence picture, and participates in forging the overall intelligence view as part of the Israeli Intelligence Community. It operates several research and collection units, including the Technical Assistance Unit (formerly the Air Photography Unit) which analyzes aerial photography, and the Zoom Unit which studies the procurement of new aircraft. Lamdan also operates alongside Aman's Visual Intelligence Branch and the Naval Intelligence Division's Visual Intelligence Unit. Until 2021, Lamdan was headed by Brigadier-General Amir Gat.
