= Shai (Haganah unit) =

Intelligence and counter-espionage arm of the Haganah

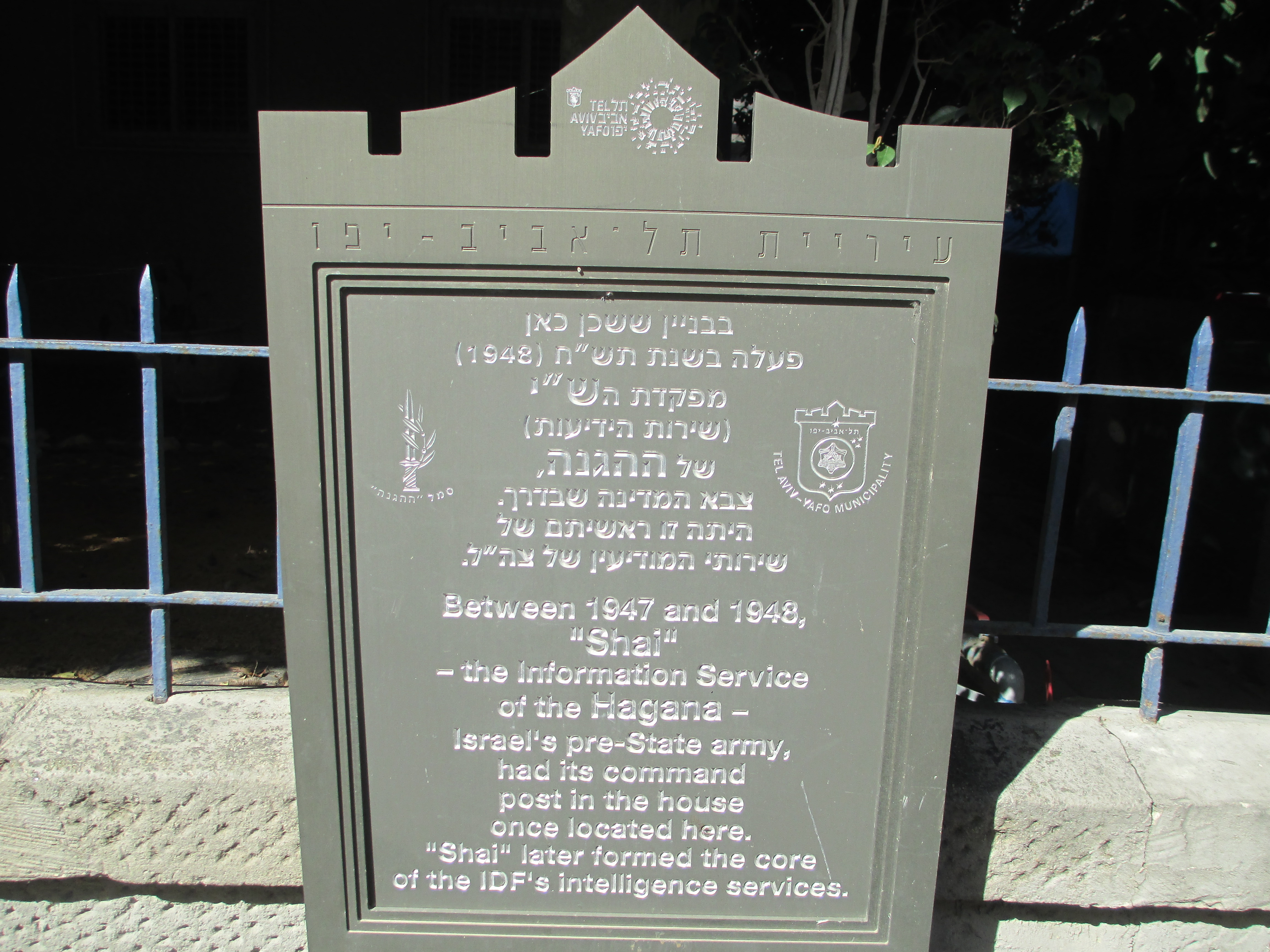
Shai memorial plaque, Tel Aviv

Shai (ש״י, an acronym for Sherut Yediot (שירות ידיעות), lit. Information Service), established in 1940, was the intelligence and counter-espionage arm of the Haganah and the forebear of the Military Intelligence Directorate in Mandate Palestine.

== History ==
During the Second World War, the British Special Operations Executive supplied the Haganah with weapons, training and funding, and the Haganah provided linguistic experts and operatives. The British provided commando training for special operations to both Shai operatives and FOSH veterans through a training school designated ME 102, which was set up by MI4.

Following the defeat of Nazi Germany, "... until 1948 the SHAI's primary objectives included the promoting of an independent Israeli state; infiltrating British mandate offices in order to inform the Jewish and Zionist leadership of British attitudes and proposed actions; collecting political information that could be used as propaganda; penetrating Arab and anti-Zionist factions in Palestine and abroad; and providing security for the arms-smuggling and illegal immigration programmes of the Haganah."

David Shaltiel was appointed head of Shai in April 1946; he was succeeded by Isser Be'eri in February 1948.

By 1948, Shai had 68 staff members, 60 British and Jewish agents, and 80 Arab agents, and spent almost $700,000 per year. It was responsible for protecting Ta'as, the clandestine munitions industry and Rekhesh, the arms procurement organisation.

Famous Shai operatives included Reuven Shiloah and Nahum Admoni. Shai was one of five intelligence agencies set up by David Ben-Gurion, the others being the internal security agency Shin Bet, the Aliyah Bet, responsible for smuggling immigrants, and the police intelligence forces.
