= Military Intelligence Directorate (Israel) =

Intelligence body of the Israel Defense Forces

Military Intelligence Directorate אגף המודיעין
- Logo of Aman

- Flag of Aman
- Common name: Aman

Agency overview
- Employees: Classified

Jurisdictional structure
- National agency: Israel
- Operations jurisdiction: Israel
- Governing body: IDF General Staff

The Military Intelligence Directorate (Hebrew: אגף המודיעין, romanized: Agaf ha-Modi'in, lit. 'Intelligence Division'), often abbreviated to Aman (אמ״ן), is the central, overarching military intelligence body of the Israel Defense Forces (IDF). Aman was created in 1950, when the Intelligence Department was spun off from the IDF's General Staff. The Intelligence Department was composed largely of former members of the Haganah Intelligence Service. Aman is an independent service, and not part of the Ground Forces, Navy or the Air Force.

It is one of the main entities and the largest component of the Israeli intelligence community, along with Mossad and Shin Bet. It includes the cyberwarfare branch Unit 8200, the human intelligence Unit 504, the secret technology Unit 81, and the training course Havatzalot Program. Its special operations are conducted by the General Staff Reconnaissance Unit (Sayeret Matkal).

== Roles and jurisdiction ==
Intelligence Corps badge.

Old logo of Aman

The IDF's Intelligence Corps (חיל המודיעין), abbreviated as Haman (חמ״ן) and headed by a brigadier general, has been detached from Aman since the Yom Kippur War, but remains under its jurisdiction.

In April 2000, the Combat Intelligence Collection Corps (חיל מודיעין השדה) was founded. Abbreviated as Modash (מוד״ש), it is the newest IDF corps, and the IDF's fifth land corps. It was designed to fulfill some of Aman's former combat intelligence functions, and is headed by a Brigadier General. Although it falls under the operational jurisdiction of the GOC Army Headquarters, it also falls under Aman's professional jurisdiction.

== History ==
Prior to the founding of the State of Israel, the Haganah engaged in intelligence-gathering activities. In 1940, the Haganah established the Shai as its military intelligence unit. During World War II, some Jewish volunteers from Palestine in the British Army served in the Intelligence Corps.

Prime Minister David Ben-Gurion commissioned the Shai in the late 1940s to create a secret service structure for Israel. Shai member Reuven Shiloah established it based on four independent services: Aman and Shin Bet, the foreign intelligence service Machleket Hacheker, and the Mossad LeAliyah Bet (defunct in March 1952).

In mid-1949 Shiloah created the Committee of Secret Service chiefs as a super-ordinate body. From 1963 the international secret service was officially called "Institute for Intelligence Service and Special Tasks" (ha-Mosad le-Modi'in u-le-Tafkidim Mejuhadim, or Mossad).

An offshoot of the Department of Defense was the lesser-known Lakam technology intelligence agency, the existence of which was a state secret. It was used to obtain scientific and technological information. In the 1980s, Lakam lost much of its previous importance.

One of the biggest defeats of the Israeli secret services was caused by Aman in the 1950s. Defense Minister Pinhas Lavon had to resign amidst the outbreak of what became known as the Lavon affair. Aman-led "Operation Susannah" was intended to attack western facilities in Egypt by Israeli agents and saboteurs. The aim was to disrupt the good ties between the United States and the Egyptian head of state, Gamal Abdel Nasser. Egypt's State Security interrogated the perpetrators and were given sensitive information from the Military Intelligence Directorate.

The US was supposed to believe that the Egyptian state is powerless against religious organizations but Egypt managed to uncover the agents. Ten members were tried in January 1955, two of them sentenced to death. Lavon resigned a month later, followed by Binyamin Gibli, then Aman's director, two weeks later. Ultimately, the Head of State Ben-Gurion resigned in 1963, worn down by the ongoing controversy.

== Units ==
Aman consists of the following subordinate and professionally subordinate units:

=== Staff units ===
- Intelligence Corps

=== Collection units ===
- Camp 1391 (IDF black site)
- Unit 8200 (Signal Intelligence)
- Unit 9900 (Visual Intelligence)
- Unit 504 (Human Intelligence)

=== Research ===
- Research Department

=== Information security ===
Old unit logo

- Information Security Department (Hebrew: המערך לביטחון מידע, HaMa'arakh LeVithon Meida, abbreviated to Mahbam): Responsible for preventing classified information from being compromised by unauthorized elements. It was formerly known as the Field Security Department. The Department engages in the study of enemy military intelligence, providing security briefings, securing classified information, and teaching and enforcement activities related to information security. Most of the security breaches that take place are in the area of computing (including the internet), and the securing of documents. The Department absorbs about 450 new Information Security NCOs annually. Its members serve in all branches of the IDF.
- Military Censor ^{[Part of Aman, but an entirely independent unit, not subordinate to any military or political level, only to parliamentary and judicial oversight]}

=== Special Operations Division ===
- Unit 81 (Secret technology)
- General Staff Reconnaissance Unit (Special Forces Intelligence Unit)
- Intelligence Center

=== Other units ===
- Supervision Department
- External Relations Department
- Ro'im Rachok
- Havatzalot Program

=== Professionally subordinate units ===
- Air Intelligence Group: the intelligence unit of the Israeli Air Force
- Naval Intelligence Division: the intelligence unit of the Israeli Navy
- Combat Intelligence Collection Corps: the intelligence unit of GOC Army Headquarters
- The intelligence units of the Regional Commands: Central, Northern, Southern and Home Front Commands
- Center for Consciousness Operations: a psychological warfare unit of the Operations Directorate

=== List of directors ===
The head of Aman is the senior intelligence officer in the IDF and engages in intelligence decision and policy-making at the same level as the heads of the Shabak and the Mossad: together, they form the three highest-ranking, co-equal heads of the Israeli Intelligence Community, focusing on the military, domestic (including the Palestinian territories), and foreign intelligence fronts respectively.

In June 2005, then-IDF's Chief of Staff, Lieutenant General Dan Halutz, in a move viewed as surprising, announced that Major General Aharon Zeevi-Farkash would be replaced by Major General Amos Yadlin. Yadlin, who had been serving as the IDF's military attaché in Washington, D.C., was a combat pilot, former head of the air force's Air Intelligence Directorate, and Halutz's deputy. Yadlin was appointed as Aman Director in January 2006, with Zeevi-Farkash having served an extended term. In November 2010, Yadlin was replaced by Major General Aviv Kochavi.

- 1948–1949: Isser Be'eri
- 1949–1950: Colonel Chaim Herzog
- 1950–1955: Colonel Binyamin Gibli
- 1955–1959: Major General Yehoshafat Harkabi
- 1959–1962: Major General Chaim Herzog
- 1962–1963: Major General Meir Amit
- 1964–1972: Major General Aharon Yariv
- 1972–1974: Major General Eli Zeira
- 1974–1978: Major General Shlomo Gazit
- 1979–1983: Major General Yehoshua Sagi
- 1983–1985: Major General Ehud Barak^{★}
- 1986–1991: Major General Amnon Lipkin-Shahak^{★}
- 1991–1995: Major General Uri Sagi
- 1995–1998: Major General Moshe Ya'alon^{★}
- 1998–2001: Major General Amos Malka
- 2001–2006: Major General Aharon Zeevi-Farkash
- 2006–2010: Major General Amos Yadlin
- 2010–2014: Major General Aviv Kochavi^{★}
- 2014–2018: Major General Herzi Halevi^{★}
- 2018–2021: Major General Tamir Haiman
- 2021–2024: Major General Aharon Haliva
- 2024–: Major General Shlomi Binder

^{★} Later promoted to Chief of the General Staff

== See also ==
- Israeli security forces
- Israeli Intelligence Community

Other military intelligence agencies

- Defence Intelligence Agency (India)
- Strategic Intelligence Agency (Indonesia)
- Glavnoye Razvedyvatel'noye Upravleniye (GRU – Russian Military Intelligence)
- Defence Intelligence and the Intelligence Corps (UK)
- Direction du Renseignement Militaire (France)
- Defense Intelligence Agency (US)
