= Yossef Harmelin =

Israeli civil servant and Shabak director

- יוסף הרמלין

Director of the Shin Bet
- In office 1964–1974
- Preceded by: Amos Manor
- Succeeded by: Avraham Ahituv
- In office 1986–1988
- Preceded by: Avraham Shalom
- Succeeded by: Yaakov Peri

Israeli Ambassador to Iran

Israeli Ambassador to South Africa

Personal details
- Born: 1922 Vienna, Austria
- Died: 12 December 1994 (aged 71–72)

Military service
- Allegiance: Israel
- Branch/service: Israel Defense Forces
- Years of service: 1940s–1949
- Battles/wars: 1948 Arab–Israeli War

Yossef Harmelin (Hebrew: יוסף הרמלין; 1922 – December 12, 1994) was an Israeli civil servant, serving as the director of the Shabak from 1964 to 1974 and again from 1986 to 1988 and as ambassador in Iran and South Africa.

Born in Vienna, Harmelin was active in Maccabi youth movement and the Hakoah Vienna Jewish sports club. He immigrated to Mandatoy Palestine in 1939 under the Youth Immigration program. He was first at Ben Shemen Youth Village and then founded kibbutz Neve Yam. Harmelin fought with the Israel Defense Forces in the 1948 Arab–Israeli War. He joined the shabak in 1949 and became deputy director of Shabak in 1960, rising to his first term as director four years later. In 1974, he left Shabak to pursue other interests, including his ambassadorship. He was the last Israeli ambassador to Iran, before diplomatic relations were severed following the Iranian Revolution. He returned to head the security agency again in 1986 following the Bus 300 affair. He retired in 1988.

== Sources ==
- Yosef Harmelin, Shabak website
