= Ami Ayalon =

Israeli politician (born 1945)

- עמי איילון
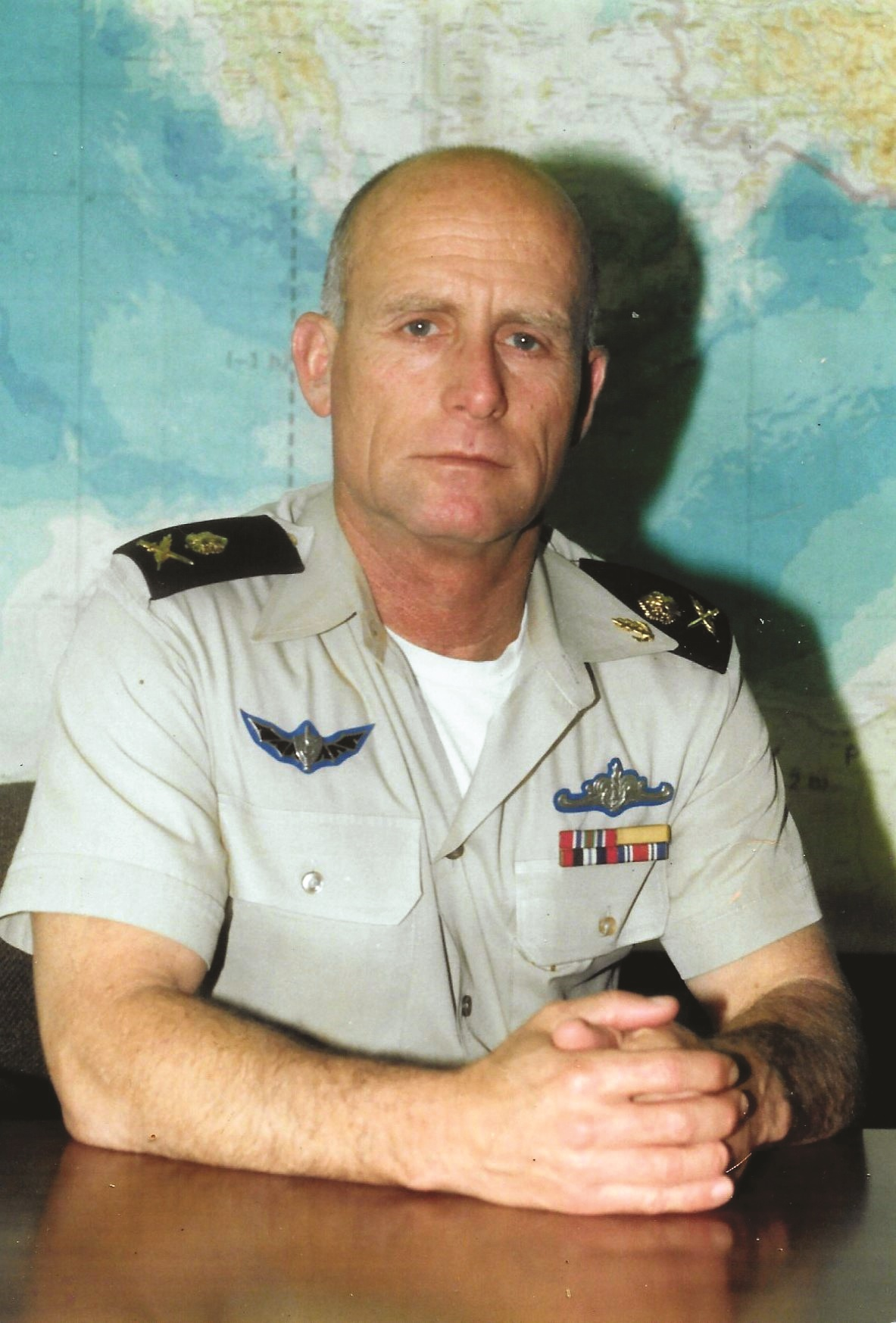

Ministerial roles
- 2007–2008: Minister without Portfolio

Faction represented in the Knesset
- 2006–2009: Labor Party

Personal details
- Born: 27 June 1945 (age 81) Tiberias, Mandatory Palestine
- Military career
- Allegiance: Israel
- Branch: Israeli Navy
- Service years: 1963–1996
- Rank: Aluf
- Commands: Shayetet 13, Israeli Navy
- Conflicts: Six-Day War; War of Attrition; Yom Kippur War; 1982 Lebanon War; South Lebanon conflict First Intifada
- Awards: Medal of Valor

Amichai "Ami" Ayalon (Hebrew: עמיחי "עמי" איילון, born 27 June 1945) is an Israeli politician and a former member of the Knesset for the Labor Party. He was previously head of the Shin Bet, Israel's security service, and commander-in-chief of the Navy. He came in second to Ehud Barak in a Labor party leadership election in June 2007 and was appointed a Minister without Portfolio in September 2007. He is one of the recipients of Israel's highest decoration, the Medal of Valor. Ayalon is a senior fellow at the Israel Democracy Institute.

== Military and security career ==
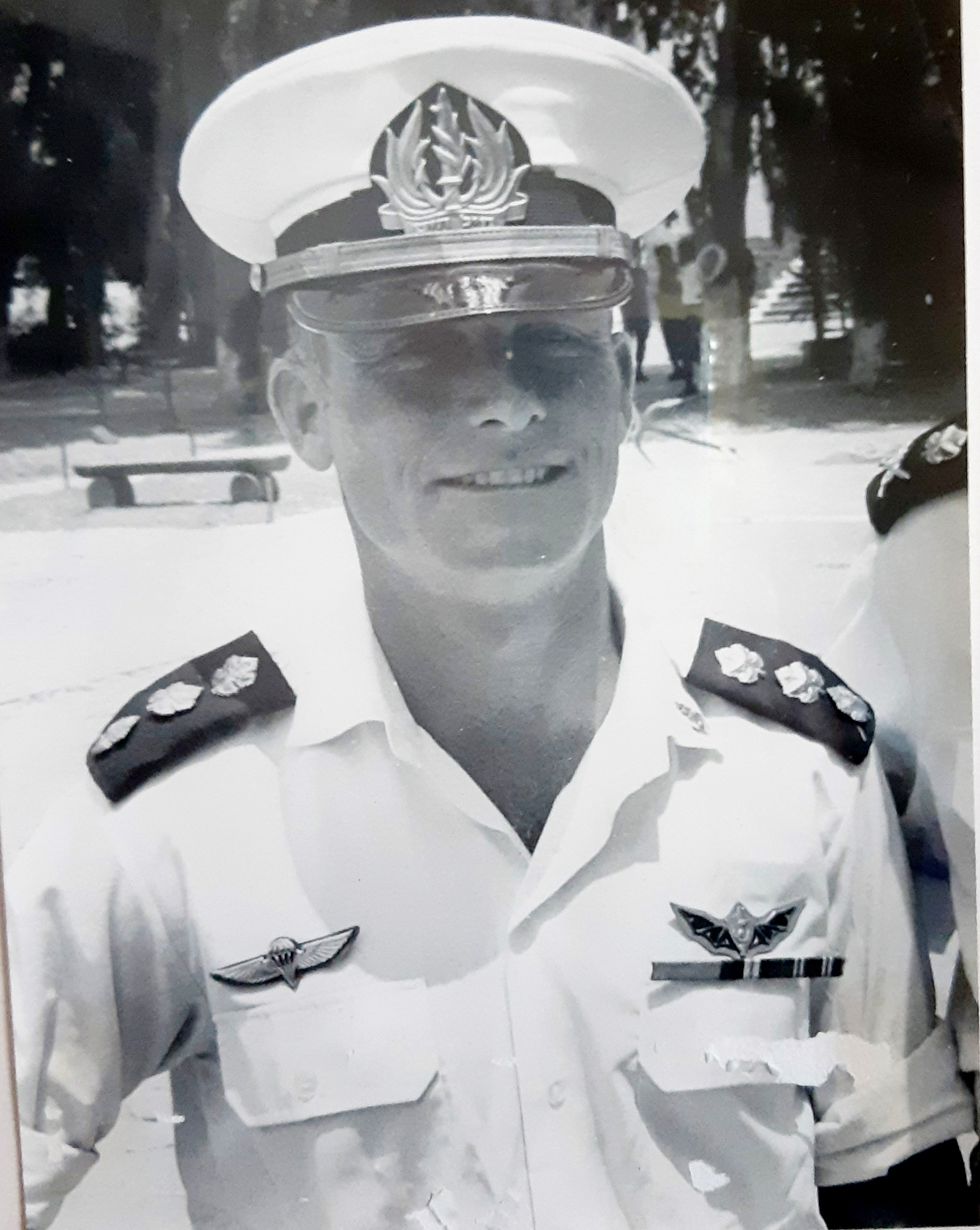
Ayalon in 1979

Ayalon served his entire military service in the Israeli Navy. Ayalon enlisted in 1963 and volunteered for the Shayetet 13 navy commando unit. In 1969, he participated in Operation Bulmus 6—the assault on fortified Green Island, Egypt (jointly with Sayeret Matkal). During the operation, he threw a grenade into one of the radar positions, and provided cover for other soldiers in the force. While climbing to the roof, he was hit in the forehead by a ricochet, but continued fighting. He stormed the position from which he was fired upon and killed two Egyptian soldiers, neutralizing the post. He continued, along with another soldier, and managed to take control of at least two more key positions on the island. While trying to take over the third position, he was injured in the leg by a grenade, kept on fighting, only to be hit by another grenade in the neck and arm. He continued firing, only reporting his injuries when the island was in full control, and was able to evacuate himself into a boat, where he injected himself with morphine. For these actions, Ayalon received the Medal of Valor, Israel's highest decoration.

In 1979, Ayalon was appointed commander of Shayetet 13 and was decorated for carrying out a long list of operations without casualties. Between 1986 and 1988 he was Defence Attache to South Africa. Ayalon, receiving the rank of major general, served as commander of the Israeli Navy from 1992 through 1996.

Following Yitzhak Rabin's assassination in 1995, Ayalon was appointed head of the Shin Bet (Israel's internal security service). Rabin himself suggested the appointment a year before his murder. Ayalon retired in 2000.

== Peace activism ==
On 25 June 2003, Ayalon launched, together with Palestinian professor Sari Nusseibeh, a peace initiative called "The People's Voice". The goal of the initiative is to collect as many signatures of Israelis and Palestinians as possible for the peace plan guidelines supporting a two-state solution without the right of return for Palestinian refugees.

On 14 November 2003, Ami Ayalon with three other former heads of the Israeli Security Agency (ISA), Avraham Shalom, Yaakov Peri and Carmi Gillon gave an interview to Yedioth Ahronoth (one of the leading tabloid newspapers in Israel) based on the paper prepared by Ami Ayalon and Sari Nusseibeh. The interview was conducted by Alex Fishman and Sima Kadmon. In that interview, the former Security Chiefs warn of an impending "catastrophe" for Israel and urge the public to rally behind a document created which sets out the principles of a two-state solution for Israel and Palestine. The blunt language and statements of grave concern are particularly striking because the ISA is the non-political nerve center of Israeli intelligence, and is the agency responsible both for gathering intelligence and for preventing terrorist attacks—including by such controversial means as targeted killings and other preventive measures. While the interview has been widely quoted, rough translations have only appeared on isolated list servers and websites, and the full power of the meeting—called "historic" by its participants—has often been diluted.

Although Ayalon promotes traditional left-wing ideas, he insists he is not a part of the Israeli left, and spurns the Israeli peace camp for its hostility toward the Israeli public and especially toward the settlers. Ayalon managed to outrage many left-wing activists when he said that only Ariel Sharon and the Likud could bring peace.

He took part in the "Mateh HaRov" demonstration in support of the withdrawal from the Gaza Strip, and made a very critical speech against the Israeli peace camp. He said:

We, who protest here, did not succeed in sinking through to the majority of the people. The majority is silent and therefore has no influence. I will tell you why the majority is not here. They are not here because we didn't manage to settle in the hearts [Hebrew: להתנחל בלבבות, originally a phrase invented by the settlers] of this true majority, the majority that makes the difference. We didn't manage to talk and perhaps we didn't even want to. We turned the settlers of Yesha into enemies and in an overbearing manner we banished them to the outskirts. We will only succeed when the grief of the evacuees will overcome the joyous cry of the evacuators. We claimed the desire for peace solely as our own. The majority sits at home and is quiet, although it wants out of Gaza the same as we do. The majority doesn't care, and shouldn't care, which person signs the accords to end the [Israeli–Palestinian] conflict. In order to get out of Gaza, the majority of the people must not be silent.

== Political career ==
In 2006, Ayalon was elected to the Knesset on the Israeli Labor Party's list, but was not given a position in the cabinet when Labor entered a coalition with Kadima.

At the end of May 2007, Ayalon was one of two candidates for the leadership of the Labor Party in the party primaries. In January 2007, public opinion polls showed Ayalon leading the race, followed by former Prime Minister Ehud Barak and Ophir Pines-Paz. He retained this lead, and just four days before the poll, on 25 May, was four points ahead of his closest rival, Ehud Barak, with 35% to Barak's 31%.

However, Ayalon finished second in the 28 May 2007 round of voting with 30.6% to Barak's 35.6%, with Amir Peretz trailing in third. With neither Ayalon nor Barak having received 40 percent of the vote, the two faced each other in a runoff on 12 June 2007, which Barak won, receiving 51.3% of the vote.

In September 2007, Ayalon was appointed to the Israeli cabinet as a Minister without Portfolio and later became a member of the security cabinet. He was also appointed chairman of the Knesset State Control Committee, which is responsible for implementing the recommendations outlined in the state comptroller's report on the performance of the Home Front Command during the 2006 Lebanon War.

On 16 November 2008, Ayalon announced he would be leaving the Labor Party for the left-wing religious Meimad party. Ultimately he did not join Meimad, and lost his seat in the 2009 elections.

In an interview with Charlie Rose, Ayalon agreed that "contingent occupation", and the lack of a "two-state solution", could lead to "a kind of ... apartheid", by saying, "Totally right. I think that we are heading directly into this destiny."

In 2012, Ayalon featured in a documentary film The Gatekeepers directed by Dror Moreh and discussed the main events of his tenure in the Shin Bet.

== Early life ==
Amihai (Ami) Ayalon was born in Tiberias, and grew up in kibbutz Ma'agan. His parents moved to the British Mandatory Palestine in the 1930s. His mother, born in Cluj, Transylvania, Romania, came as a young girl to study in Jerusalem; his father, Yitzhak, emigrated illegally also from Transylvania, Romania, and was one of the founders of Ma'agan, where he worked until retirement as a carpenter.

Ayalon graduated from Bar-Ilan University with a Bachelor of Arts in 1980. In 1992, he received a Master of Public Administration from Harvard University's John F. Kennedy School of Government. In 2010, he received a Master of Studies in Law from Bar-Ilan University. He is the chairman of the Executive Committee of the maritime policy & strategy research center (HMS). He is married, and the father of three. Ayalon lives in Kerem Maharal.

== Published works ==
- Friendly Fire: How Israel Became its Own Worst Enemy and the Hope for its Future

== Interviews ==
In a 2024 interview, Ayalon said: "If I were a Palestinian, I would fight those who occupied my land". Ayalon, who headed the Shabak (Shin Bet, Israel's secret service) from 1996 to 2000 said that "if he were a Palestinian, he would fight with strength against those who took his land".

Ayalon has emphasized several times in interviews with Arabic and other foreign media: "Israelis cannot blame the Palestinians for their resistance to the occupation, and if I were a Palestinian, I would fight endlessly against those who are looting my land".

Ayalon explained that, in 1948, Israel was established in the occupied Palestinian territories, which displaced hundreds of thousands of Palestinians. Israel later occupied more land and always rejected the establishment of an independent Palestinian state.

Ayalon also said: "Palestinians have lost their land. Therefore, when they ask me, what would you do if you were a Palestinian? In response, I say: If someone plundered my land, I would fight him without limit." He continued: "Palestinians consider themselves a single nation, but one of our troubles is that we see them as individuals, some of whom are good and some who are bad."

According to report of Al Jazeera Mubasher, he said: "If he were a Palestinian, he would fight a "borderless" battle against those who occupied his land".

Ayalon also said in an interview with the Hebrew newspaper Maariv: "They (Palestinians) have lost their land, so when people ask me: What would you do if you were a Palestinian? I say: If a person comes and takes my land, the land of Israel, as a hostage, I will fight him without limits". Ayalon continued: "We think that if we provide them with ways of livelihood and food for their children, the problem will be solved, but it is not the case. They are willing to kill and be killed, but not for food. They say we need the end of occupation and return of our independence." "Ayalon" clarified: "They (Palestinians) do not want what we propose. They only care about the formation of a Palestinian state."

Ayalon, who was a former member of the Knesset, added: "In 1923, Ze'ev Jabotinsky wrote the essay "Iron Wall". He says the same thing as me. He says: 'We cannot blame Palestinians. Their land has been taken away and they will fight with us'."

Earlier, Ayalon, in response to a question about the situation of Palestinians who are exposed to Israeli attacks, said: "This is the life of people who have dream of freedom but cannot see it. Whether we like it or not. 'We control the lives of millions of people'." Ayalon also stressed: "The only way the Israelis will achieve security is when the Palestinians have hope."

== See also ==
- Fathi Razem
