= 2007 Israeli Labor Party leadership election =

Israeli Labor Party leadership election

- 28 May 2007 (first round); 12 June 2007 (second round)

vote by general membership of party
- Turnout: 65.13% (first round); 64.5% (second round)
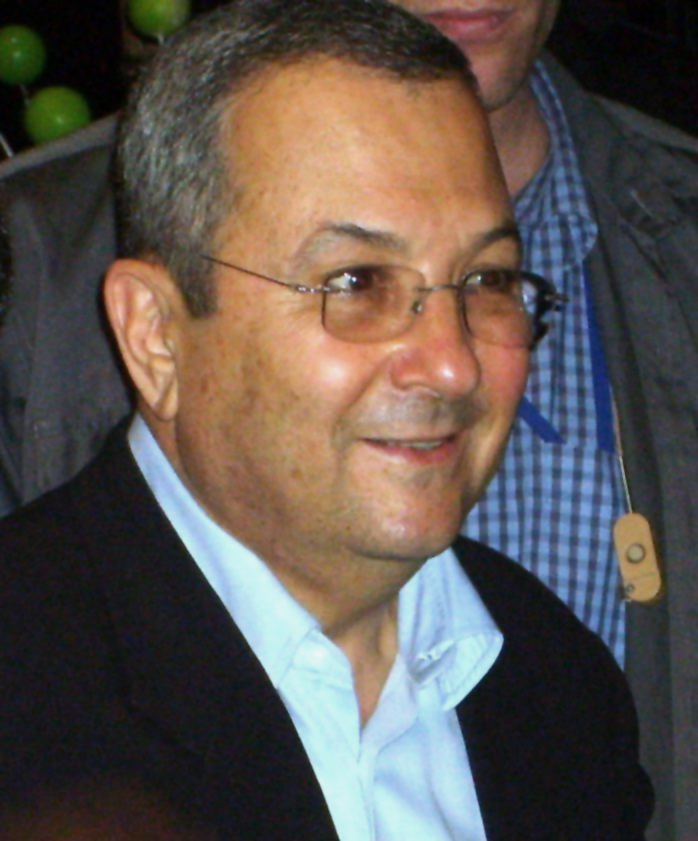

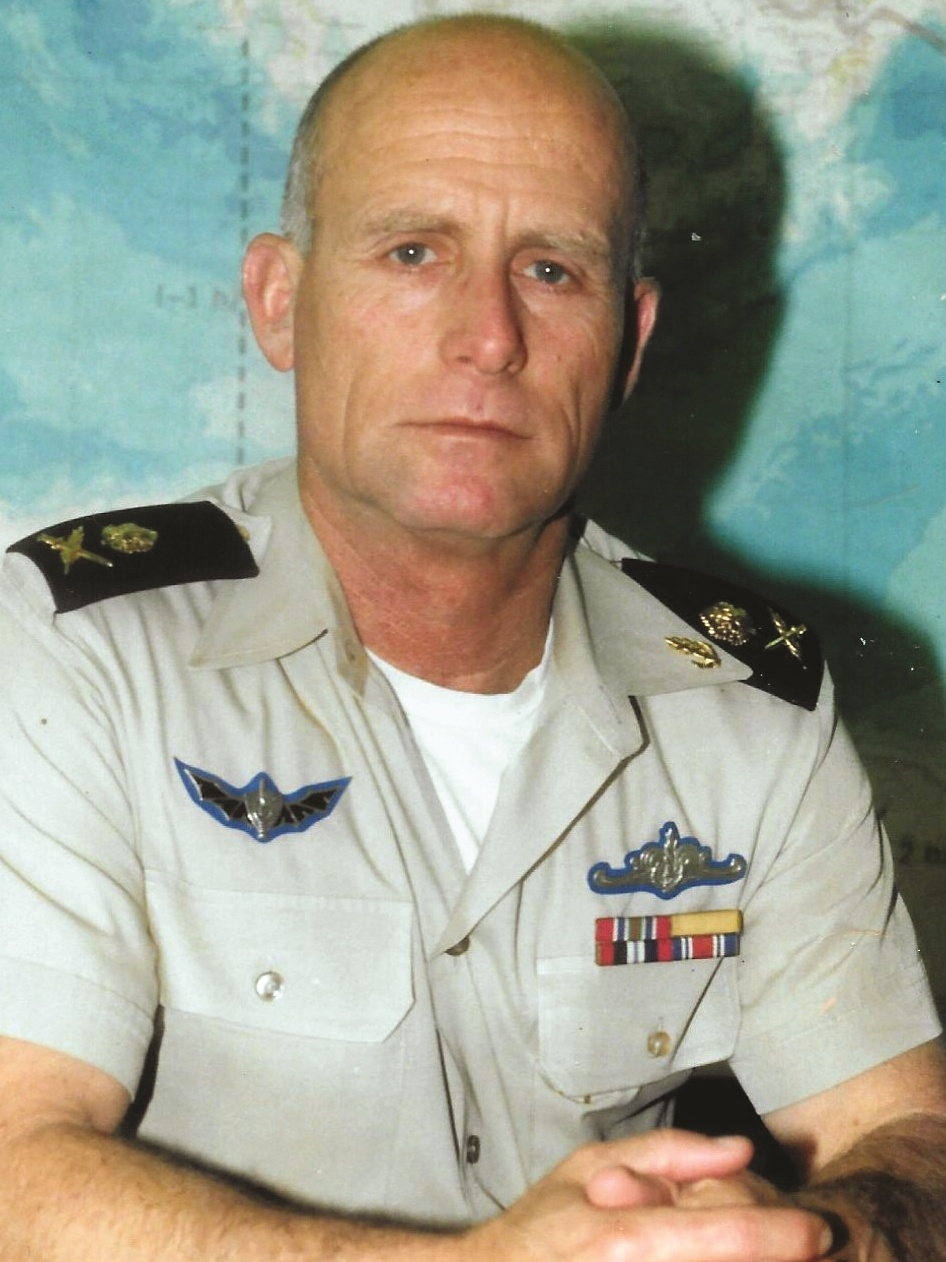

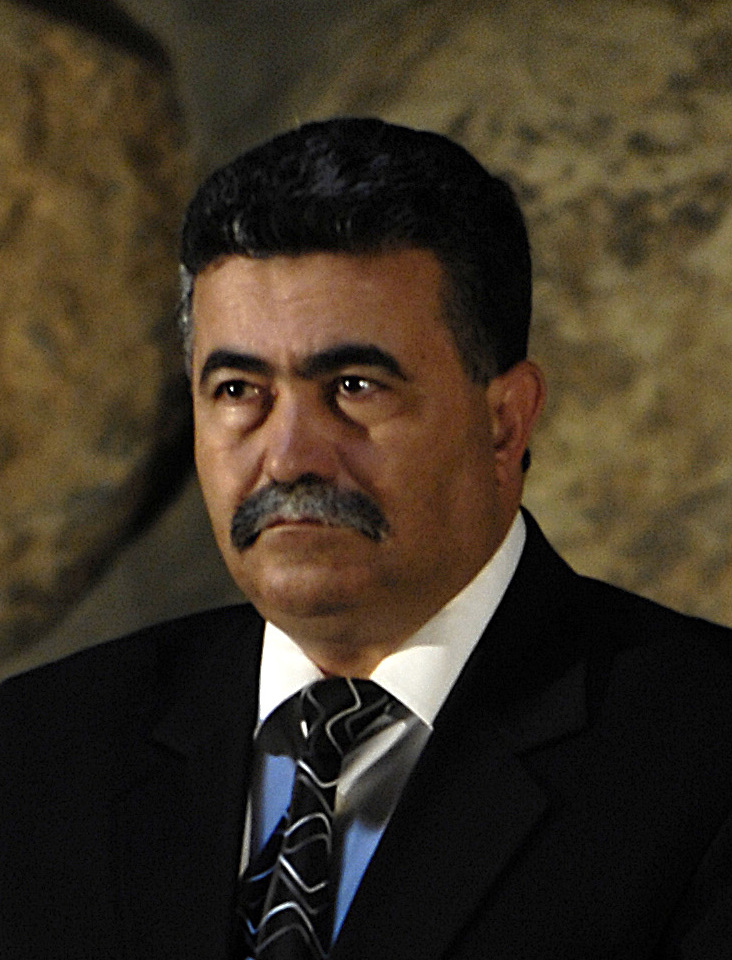

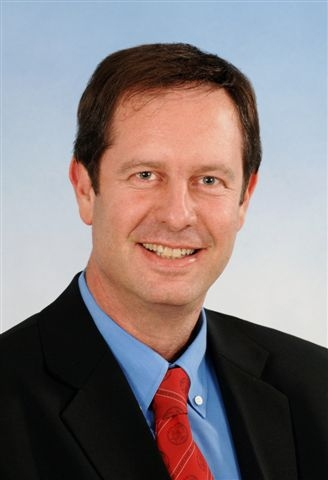
Candidate	Ehud Barak	Ami Ayalon
Party	Labor	Labor
First round	23,887; 35.63%	20,514; 30.60%
Runoff	34,542; 51.29%	32,117; 47.69%
Candidate	Amir Peretz	Ophir Pines-Paz
Party	Labor	Labor
First round	15,037; 22.43%	5,330; 7.95%
Leader before election
Amir Peretz
Elected Leader
Ehud Barak

A leadership election was held by the Israeli Labor Party on 12 June 2007, to elect the party's new leader, due to internal dissatisfaction with the incumbent chairman Amir Peretz. The winner was Ehud Barak.

== History ==
Five candidates ran in the election: Ehud Barak attempted to return to politics, this time after the move of Shimon Peres to Kadima, while Ami Ayalon announced his ambition to become prime minister.

Ofir Pines-Paz had been chairman of the coalition in the Fifteenth Knesset. He was the party's secretary-general in 2001-2003. In the 2006 election he was third in the Labor-Meimad list, after Peretz and Isaac Herzog. When Yisrael Beiteinu joined the coalition and Avigdor Lieberman was appointed minister, Pines-Paz resigned from the government. His resignation took effect on 1 November 2006. Danny Yatom ran in the election but came last in the first round of voting.

The election consisted of two rounds, the first of which took place on 28 May 2007. Ehud Barak won a slim victory in the party primary, beating Ayalon, former head of the Shin Bet domestic security service. Both candidates polled well ahead of Peretz, but neither gained the requisite 40-percent margin of victory for an outright win. Peretz, then the Incumbent leader of the party, came third and did not advance to the second round. he subsequently endorsed Ayalon, while Pines-Paz endorsed Barak. Barak won the second round with 51.3% of the vote to Ayalon's 47.7%, with 1% of voters abstaining.

== Opinion polls ==
=== First round ===
Poll	Date	Barak	Ayalon	Peretz	Pines	Yatom	Other / Don't Know
Globes	17 May 2007	35%	33%	15%	9%	2%	6%

=== Second round ===
Poll	Date	Barak	Ayalon	Other / Don't Know
Rafi Smith Institute	6 June 2007	49%	44%	7%

== Results ==
In the first round, Ayalon won a plurality of votes in the Kibbutzim, while Peretz won a plurality of Arab Voters.

Candidate	First round		Second round	
Candidate	Votes	%	Votes	%
Ehud Barak	23,887	35.63	34,542	51.29
Ami Ayalon	20,514	30.60	32,117	47.69
Amir Peretz	15,037	22.43		
Ophir Pines-Paz	5,330	7.95		
Danny Yatom	1,806	2.69		
Blank votes	462	0.69	683	1.01
Total	67,036	100.00	67,342	100.00
Valid votes	67,036	99.38	67,342	99.68
Invalid votes	418	0.62	218	0.32
Total votes	67,454	100.00	67,560	100.00
Registered voters/turnout	103,568	65.13		64.5
Source: Globes, Ynet, Karmel
