= Yuval Diskin =

Ex-director of Israel's Shin Bet

- יובל דיסקין
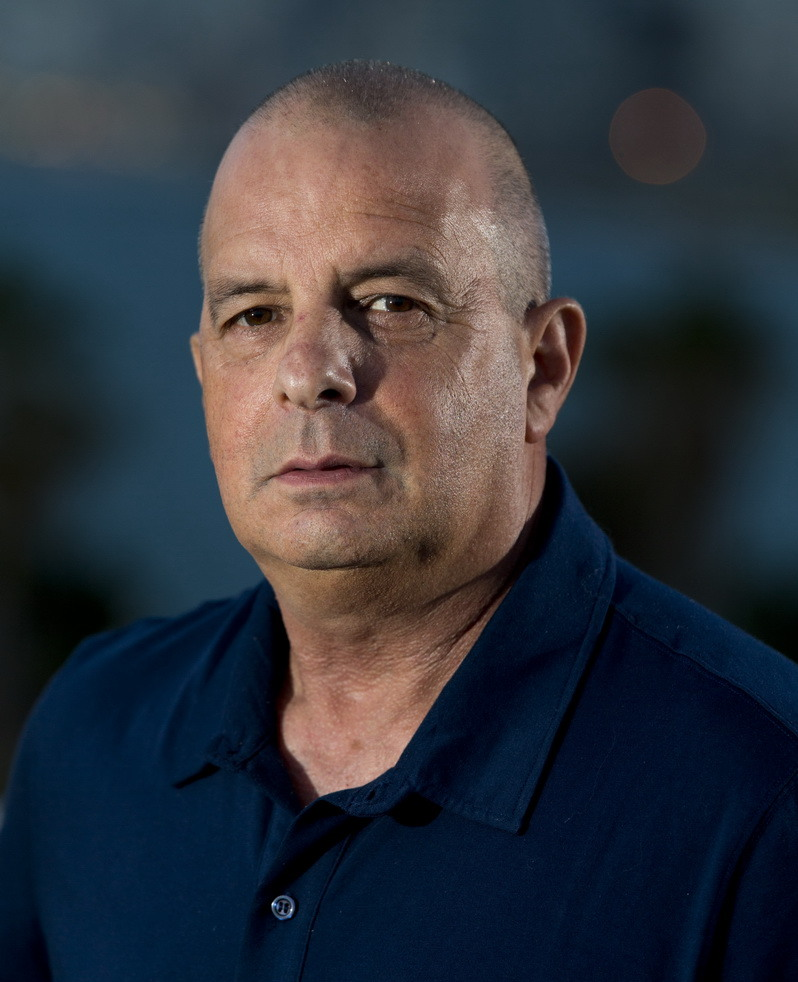
- Born: June 11, 1956 (age 70); Givatayim, Israel
- Occupation: Intelligence officer
- Espionage activity
- Allegiance: Israel
- Service branch: Shin Bet
- Service years: 1978–2011
- Rank: Director-General

Yuval Shalom Diskin (Hebrew: יובל דיסקין; born June 11, 1956) is a former director of the Israeli internal security service Shin Bet, serving as its 13th director from 2005 to 2011. He was appointed by Prime Minister Ariel Sharon, and later served under subsequent Prime Ministers Ehud Olmert and Benjamin Netanyahu.

== Early life ==
Diskin was born and raised in Givataim, to Avraham and Shlomit Diskin. In August 1974 he enlisted into the IDF and volunteered for the Shaked unit. He underwent combat training and participated in combat activities with the unit. He went to officer's training course and returned to the unit as a team leader. In 1978 he was discharged from the IDF after becoming a platoon commander in the unit.

== Career in the security service, 1978-2011 ==
In 1990, he was appointed head of department in Shabak's Counter Terrorism Division, which was responsible for the collection and analysis of intelligence and carrying out operations based on information received. In 1993 he was entrusted, by Prime Minister Yitzhak Rabin and then-director general of the Shabak Yaakov Peri, to establish ties with the Palestinian security forces as part of the Oslo Peace Accord.

On May 15, 2005, he was appointed by Prime Minister Ariel Sharon to replace Avi Dichter as the Director of the Shin Bet.

During his tenure as Director, Diskin led the development of the Shabak's cyber capabilities. These counter-cyberterrorism capabilities are both offensive—preventing terrorist and suicide attacks to the point of their termination in Israel.

In 2009, in an unusual act, the Israeli Prime Minister Benjamin Netanyahu requested Diskin to extend his service, due to his integral and unique role in maintaining the national security of Israel.

On May 15, 2011, Diskin was replaced as Director by his former deputy, Yoram Cohen.

In February 2015, Avi Primor, ex ambassador to Germany, introduced Diskin as the head of Diskin Advanced Technologies to Ferdinand Piëch, VW-CEO "as a favor". As a result of the meeting Diskin and Piëch founded a company named Cymotive Technologies in Herzliya, with 40% ownership through VW´s AutoVision, and 60% by Diskin Advanced Technologies, to close cybersecurity gaps of linked cars. Primor told Piëch about the impending dieselgate.

== Views and opinions ==
In January 2013, prior to Israel's parliamentary elections, Diskin harshly criticized Benjamin Netanyahu's leadership. He told Israeli newspaper Yedioth Ahronoth in 2013, that "if we look at it over the years, one of the main people contributing to Hamas's strengthening has been Bibi (Benjamin) Netanyahu, since his first term as prime minister."

Diskin, along with former Mossad Director Meir Dagan and former IDF Chief of Staff Gabi Ashkenazi, have been highly critical of the diplomatic positions of Prime Minister Netanyahu's coalition; since his retirement from the Shabak, he has spoken on a number of occasions on his view of the need for diplomatic progress vis-à-vis the Palestinian Authority and the wider Arab world.

== Honors ==
In 2012, Diskin was selected by Foreign Policy magazine as one of the Top 100 Global Thinkers for his standout contribution to the intellectual debate of foreign policy.

In 2012, Diskin, along with the other living former directors of the Shabak, was featured in a documentary film, The Gatekeepers in which he discussed some of the main events of his tenure in the Shin Bet and identified as a fluent speaker of Palestinian Arabic.
