= Ehud Yatom =

Israeli politician (born 1948)

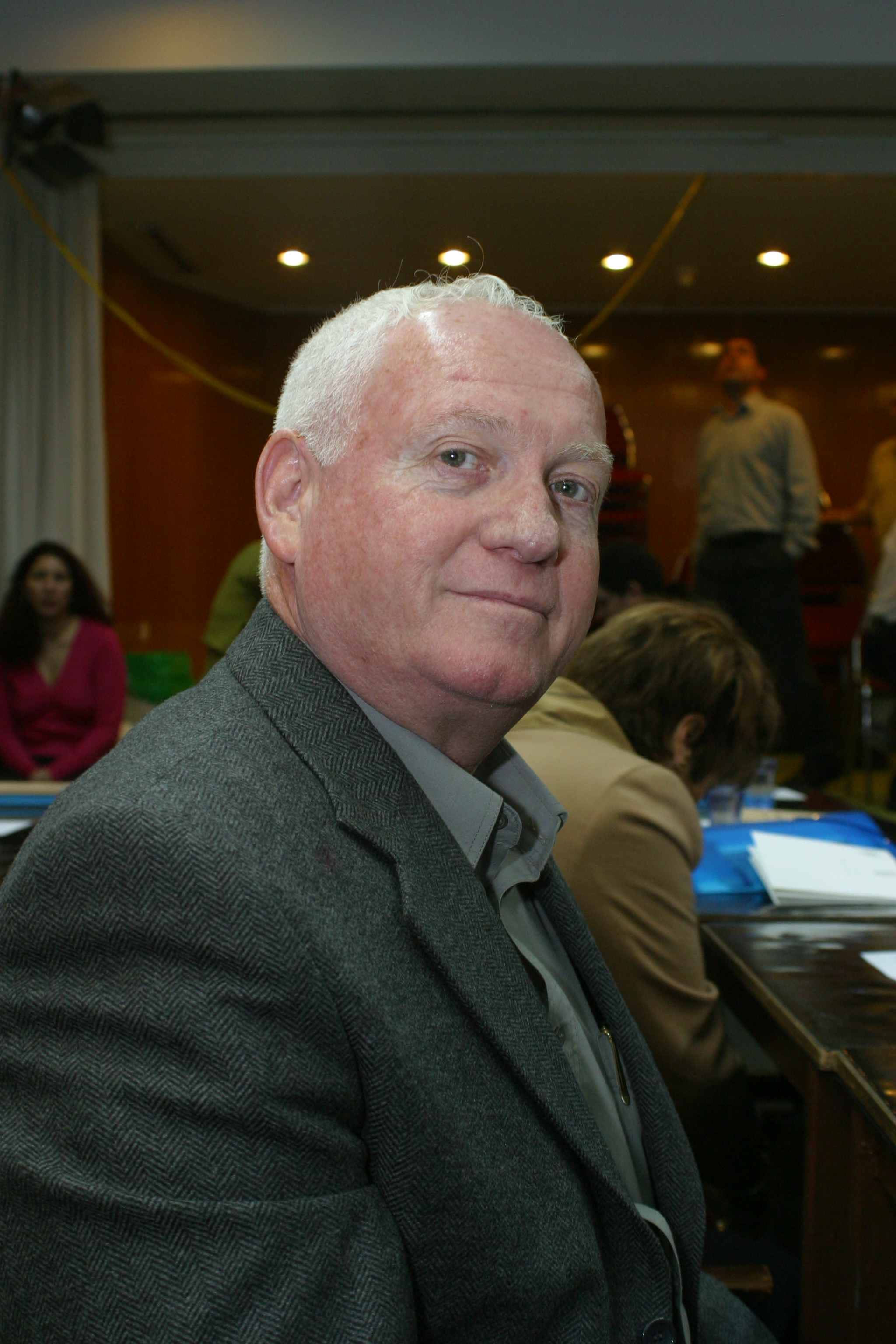
- Yatom in 2003

Faction represented in the Knesset
- 2003–2006: Likud

Personal details
- Born: 26 September 1948 (age 77) Netanya, Israel

Ehud Yatom (Hebrew: אהוד יתום; born 26 September 1948) is an Israeli former Shin Bet agent and politician who served as a member of the Knesset for Likud between 2003 and 2006.

== Biography ==
Yatom was born in Netanya, the brother of Mossad head and politician Danny Yatom. He worked for the Shin Bet and was one of the agents who killed two terrorists in the Kav 300 extrajudicial killing in 1984, by smashing their heads with rocks. In 2001 the High Court of Justice ruled that Yatom was unfit to serve as a top government anti-terror advisor, six months after he was named for the position by Prime Minister Ariel Sharon.

== Political career ==
In the 2003 elections he was placed 23rd on the Likud list, and entered the Knesset when the party won 38 seats. Whilst an MK, he served as a member of several committees; the Foreign Affairs and Defense Committee, the Internal Affairs and Environment Committee and the Labour, Welfare and Health Committee. He was also a member of the parliamentary inquiry committee for the Amona events.

Prior to the 2006 elections he placed 32nd on the Likud list, and lost his seat when the party won only 12 seats.
