= Carmi Gillon =

Israeli diplomat

- כרמי גילון
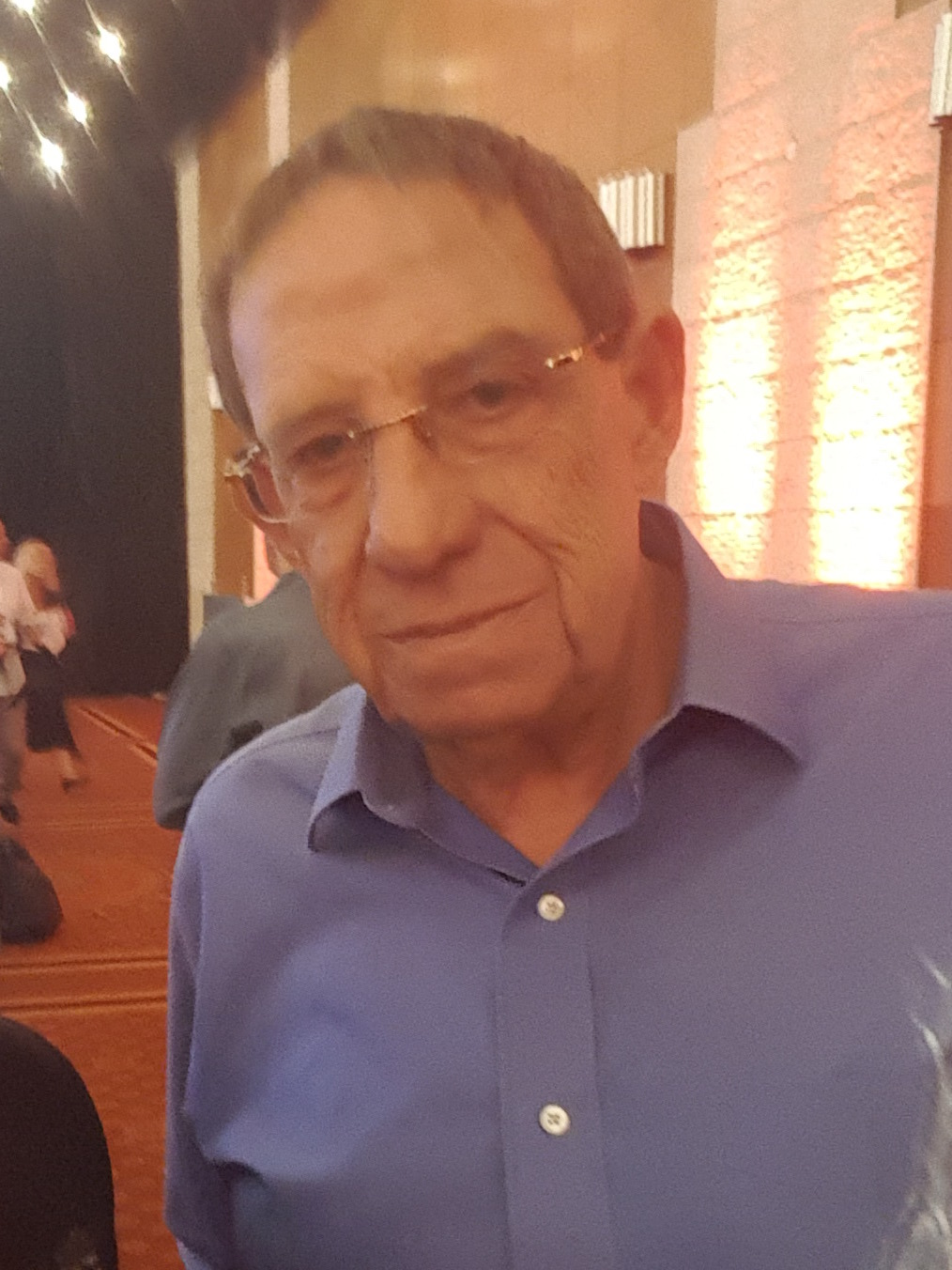
- Carmi Gilon, 2018
- Born: January 1950 (age 76); Jerusalem
- Education: Hebrew University of Jerusalem (B.A.); University of Haifa (M.A.)
- Spouse: Sari Gillon
- Children: Three
- Military career
- Allegiance: Israel
- Branch: Israel Defense Forces
- Commands: Head of Shin Bet
- Conflicts: War of Attrition
- Other work: Director General of the Peres Center for Peace; Ambassador to Denmark; Head of Mevasseret Zion local council; Vice President for External Relations, Hebrew University of Jerusalem

Carmi Gillon (Hebrew: כרמי גילון; born January 1950) is an Israeli politician and a former Israeli ambassador to Denmark and head of Shin Bet, Israel's internal security service, from 1994 to 1996.

After the 4 November 1995 assassination of Yitzhak Rabin, he attracted criticism for failing to provide adequate security.

He graduated from the National Security College. He has a B.A. in political science from the Hebrew University, where he was recruited into the Shin Bet, and an M.A. in public policy from the University of Haifa. He attended a six-week advanced management program at Harvard Business School, and completed management training at Harvard Kennedy School.

== Biography ==
Gillon was born in Jerusalem. His mother, Saada Gillon (née Frumkin), was born in Ottoman Judea to which her ancestors immigrated from the Russian Empire in the 19th century, likewise Gillon's maternal great grandfather was Israel Dov Frumkin, a pioneer of Hebrew journalism who arrived 1859 (When Judea was part of Ottoman Syria). His maternal grandfather, Gad Frumkin, was one of the first trained attorneys in British-Palestine (a novel parcellation after WW1), who was the only Jewish judge on the Supreme Court of Palestine during the British Mandate era and was also a member of the Hebrew University of Jerusalem's Board of Governors from the 1930s until his death. His maternal grandmother, Chana Frumkin, was the daughter of Aharon Eisenberg, a pioneer of the First Aliyah who was one of the founders of Rehovot, and was the President of B'nai B'rith in Jerusalem. His mother served as Deputy Attorney General. His father, Colin Gillon, was born Colin Gluckman to a Jewish family in Johannesburg, South Africa, and immigrated to Palestine in 1937. Gillon's paternal grandmother, Katie Gluckman, was a prominent activist in the Zionist movement in South Africa. Colin served as State Attorney, and Hebraized his name from Gluckman to Gillon at Prime Minister David Ben-Gurion's insistence.

Gillon studied at high school in the Jerusalem neighborhood of Rehavia, and at the Academy of Music. He began his military service in the Israel Defense Forces in the Armored Corps, but was transferred to the Artillery Corps. He was wounded in action in the War of Attrition, and was discharged from the IDF in 1971. In 1972, he began studying political science and public administration at the Hebrew University of Jerusalem.

Gillon is married to Sari. He has three children and five grandchildren.

== Shin Bet career ==
In 1972, Gillon was recruited by Shin Bet during his university studies. He initially worked as a bodyguard for senior staff. From 1982 to 1987, he was chief of the Shin Bet Jewish Department. From 1987 to 1989, he attended the National Security College, serving in a number of senior positions during his studies for an MA in political science and public administration. From 1989, he was chief of the Training Division. From 1990, he was chief of the Shin Bet Northern Command, a position in which he was responsible for Shin Bet activity in Lebanon. From 1993 to 1994, he was chief of the Administrative Division, responsible for HR, finances, and logistics. For four months in 1994, he was Shin Bet acting director during Yaakov Peri’s academic leave.

From March 1995 to February 1996, Gillon was the director of Shin Bet. B'Tselem, Human Rights Watch, and other human rights organizations have criticized his oversight. "During his tenure, and until the Israel High Court of Justice ruled against such methods in 1999, GSS interrogators were officially sanctioned to use 'moderate physical pressure' on detainees (the vast majority of them Palestinians)," according to Amnesty International. From October 1994, when a suicide bomb killed 23 people, they were allowed to use "increased physical pressure". Secret government guidelines set down what "moderate physical pressure" and "increased physical pressure" allowed; according to court testimonies of GSS members themselves, this included subjecting detainees to sleep deprivation, prolonged shackling in painful positions, hooding with filthy sacks, being forced to squat like a frog (gambaz) and violent shaking (tiltul). During Carmi Gillon's period of service with the GSS such methods of interrogation were used against several hundred Palestinian detainees every year, many of whom were later released without charge.

In 1995, the Shin Bet's VIP protection unit failed to prevent the assassination of Prime Minister Rabin. Gillon had been in Paris at the time of the assassination, and upon returning to Israel, immediately submitted his resignation to Acting Prime Minister Shimon Peres, who rejected it. Nevertheless, he resigned the following year. The Shamgar Commission was critical of the Shin Bet under his tenure.

== Private sector ==
After leaving the service, Gillon served as general manager of the Avner Insurance Company (1997–2000) and then as director general of the Peres Center for Peace (2000–2001). He also studied at Harvard Business School.

== Ambassador to Denmark ==
From 2001 to 2003, he was the Israeli ambassador to Denmark. When he was nominated for the position in 2001, Human Rights Watch called for the Danish government to reject his appointment and for Israel to withdraw his nomination, while Amnesty International asked the Danish authorities to investigate him for torture, and if there was enough evidence for a prosecution, to detain him under the UN Convention against Torture, and to either try him or extradite him to a state willing to try him. Danish Justice Minister Frank Jensen initially said that Gillon could be arrested and prosecuted under the terms of the Convention after he admitted using "moderate physical pressure" on Palestinian detainees, but later backed down, acknowledging that as an ambassador, Gillon was protected by diplomatic immunity.

Gillon defended the use of torture as a means of "self-defense against terrorism." He told Danish media that Israel might have to re-introduce "moderate physical pressure" when interrogating suspected Palestinian terrorists. "We banned this form of interrogation in Israel in 1999 because of the peace process. Unfortunately, it looks like we may have to start using it again," Gillon said. One member of parliament, Centre Democrat leader Peter Duetoft, called opposition to Gillon's appointment "hypocritical" because Yasser Arafat, "the biggest terrorist", had recently visited Denmark without there having been similar objections.

In January 2014, Gillon arrived in Denmark to attend the Copenhagen Film Festival for a screening of The Gatekeepers and to deliver a lecture. After a Danish anti-torture NGO reported Gillon to the police for torture, Gillon left Denmark on January 10. The Prosecutor's Office subsequently rejected the complaint due to lack of evidence.

== Politics and other activities ==
From 2003 to 2007, he was elected head of the Mevasseret Zion local council. From 2007 to 2013, he was vice president for external relations for Hebrew University of Jerusalem.

Gillon has been a member of a number of boards of directors, including the Tahal Group, Danker Investment, and the Arab Israel Bank. From 2014, he was chairman and CEO of Carmi Gillon Inc., chairman of CYTEGIC, and external director of the Dan Hotels chain.

Over the years, Gillon has written several books and a range of articles on the subjects of foreign affairs and security. He has also been an active current affairs commentator in the electronic media in Israel and overseas.

In 2012, Gillon was featured in a documentary film, The Gatekeepers, and discussed the main events of his tenure in Shin Bet.
