= Landau Commission =

1987 Israeli commission

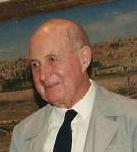
Moshe Landau

The Landau Commission was a three-man Commission set up by the Israeli Government in 1987 following a long-running scandal over the deaths of two Palestinian prisoners in custody and the wrongful conviction of a Circassian IDF officer. The Commission, headed by former Supreme Court Justice Moshe Landau, found that the GSS (General Security Service/Shabak/Shin Bet) interrogators routinely used physical force during the interrogation of prisoners and then committed perjury at subsequent trials. In its conclusion, approved by Cabinet in November 1987, it lay down guidelines for the use of a "moderate measure of physical pressure". The details of the recommended methods were described in the classified appendix to the report. In 1994 the UN Committee Against Torture stated: "The Landau Commission Report, permitting as it does 'moderate physical pressure' as a lawful mode of interrogation, is completely unacceptable to this Committee."

== Background ==
The hijacking of Bus 300 in 1984 led to public disquiet about the GSS. In 1986 the head of the GSS, Avraham Shalom, resigned after being accused of attempting to frame a senior IDF general for the murder of two Palestinian prisoners killed after the hijacking. With his resignation he was given a presidential pardon. On 6 August 1986 the Supreme Court rejected an appeal against the pardon, but Attorney General Yosef Harish promised there would be an investigation.

Over the summer of 1986 the Israeli public were also facing the unfolding Pollard spy scandal in the United States as well as the publication of a very critical report into the banking system. It is possible that concerns about the GSS would have been forgotten. But a fresh scandal arouse the following year, April 1987.

A change in the law had created an opening for verdicts of Military Courts to be challenged in the Supreme Court. In 1980 Azat Naffso, an IDF Lieutenant and member of Israel's 2,000-strong Circassian community from Kfar Kanna, had been convicted by a secret court martial of transmitting information and explosives to "hostile parties" and sentenced to 18 years in prison. Naffso lodged an appeal against his sentence on the grounds of fabricated evidence and false testimony. At the end of May 1987 he was released after being cleared of most of the charges. Attorney General Harish had offered no opposition to the appeal. The court was very critical about GSS behavior, in particular by GSS claims that Naffso's confessions, on which the case was based, were given freely and without undue pressure. The court ordered that Naffso should be financially compensated and his IDF rank restored. Once again GSS activities were being discussed in public. Israeli state television quoted "Senior Shabak (GSS) figures" as saying that Naffso was subject to procedures identical to those "in hundreds of other cases."

Under immense pressure from the judiciary the Government set up a secret three-man Commission of inquiry headed by the President of the Supreme Court Moshe Landau.

== The Commission ==
The "Commission of Inquiry into the Methods of Investigation of the General Security Service Regarding Hostile Terrorist Activity" was established on 31 May 1987. Its remit was to look into "the investigation methods and procedures of the GSS on Hostile Terrorist Activity, and the giving of testimony in Court regarding these investigations."

The final report was published on 30 October 1987 and endorsed by the cabinet 8 November 1987.

=== The findings ===
==== Perjury ====
In the previous two decades some 50% of GSS interrogations led to trials, and "the overwhelming majority of those tried were convicted on the basis of their confession in court."

The Commission found that interrogators were permitted "from time to time to employ means of pressure, including physical pressure." They found this measure "unavoidable" and "an interrogation tool of utmost importance" but that a "dilemma" arose about revealing the methods of interrogation since it would "appear to the court as violating the principle of a person's free will, and thus causing the rejection of the confession."

They found that the GSS "simply lied, thus committing the criminal offence of perjury" and that "false testimony in court soon became the unchallenged norm which was to be the rule for 16 years." In 1982 a written "guideline as to the nature of the lie to be told" with regard to "method of physical pressure" was issued by the highest GSS authorities.

The Commission was satisfied that the practice of committing perjury had "completely discontinued" after the head of GSS issued a directive on 10 June 1987.

It also found that the judges, prosecutors, police and medical personnel were unaware of systematic perjury by GSS interrogators. "Even though no judges were called to appear before us and we heard no explicit denial, we find this allegation to be baseless, and wholly unacceptable."

==== Habeas corpus ====
With regard to Habeas Corpus the Commission found that the keeping of prisoners "without judicial supervision for a period of 18 days not acceptable." Hence "We support the proposal to shorten this period and recommend that the question of prolonging the detention be brought before a judge no later than the eighth day after the day of his arrest."

==== Interrogation techniques ====
The Commission found that the use of violence against Palestinians suspected of terrorism and other Palestinian prisoners was an acceptable method of interrogation. They argued, in the light of what they called "the concept of the lesser evil", that "actual torture it is unacceptable but . . . moderate physical pressure would be perhaps be justified in order to uncover a bomb about to explode in a building full of people . . . whether the charge is certain to be detonated in five minutes or in five days."

"To put it bluntly, the alternative is: are we to accept the offence of assault entailed in slapping a suspect's face, or threatening him, in order to induce him to talk and reveal a cache of explosive materials meant for use in carrying an act of mass terror against a civilian population, and thereby prevent the greater evil which is about to occur? The answer is self evident."

Elsewhere they state: "The effective interrogation of terrorist suspects is impossible without the use of means of pressure, in order to overcome an obdurate will not to disclose information and to overcome the fear of the person under interrogation that harm will befall him from his own organization, if he does reveal information." And: "The means of pressure should principally take the form of non-violent psychological pressure through a vigorous and extensive interrogation, with the use of stratagems, including acts of deception. However, when these do not attain their purpose, the exertion of a moderate measure of physical pressure cannot be avoided."

But they identified a danger: "a security service . . . is always in danger of sliding towards methods practised in regimes which we abhor." And "It is true that strict care must be taken, lest a breach of the structure of prohibitions of the criminal law bring about a loosening of the reins, with each interrogator taking matters into his own hands through the unbridled, arbitrary use of coercion against a suspect. In this way the image of the State as a law-abiding polity which preserves the rights of the citizen, is liable to be irreparably perverted, with it coming to resemble those regimes which grant their security organs unbridled power."

It recommended:

"First, disproportionate exertion of pressure on the suspect is inadmissible; the pressure must never reach the level of physical torture or maltreatment of the suspect or grievous harm to his honour which deprives him of his human dignity. Second, the possible use of less serious measures must be weighed against the degree of anticipated danger, according to the information in the possession of the interrogator. Third, the physical and psychological means of pressure permitted for use by an interrogator must be defined and limited in advance, by issuing binding directives. Fourth, there must be strict supervision of the implementation in practice of the directives given to GSS interrogators. Fifth, the interrogator's superiors must react firmly and without hesitation to every deviation from the permissible, imposing disciplinary punishment, and in serious cases by causing criminal proceedings to be instituted against the offending interrogator."

The guidelines for means of pressure permitted were contained in the second part of the report, which "for understandable reasons" were kept secret. The Commission stated that the code was less severe than techniques used by the British army in Northern Ireland and followed the standards set down by the European Court of Human Rights in 1978. They recommended that the code should be reviewed annually by a small Ministerial Committee "reporting to the Services Subcommittee of the Knesset's Defence and Foreign Affairs Committee."

=== Physical pressure ===
==== Before the Commission ====
In 1968 the International Committee for the Red Cross issued a report on Nablus Prison, one of the IDF's detention centers in the recently captured West Bank. It found:

1. "Suspension of the detainee by the hands and simultaneous traction of his other members for hours at a time until he loses consciousness.
2. Burns with cigarette stubs.
3. Blows by rods on the genitals.
4. Tying up and blindfolding for days.
5. Bites by dogs.
6. Electric shocks at the temples, the mouth, the chest and testicles."

In February 1970 the United Nations Economic and Social Council issued a report which had two annexes containing evidence of the mistreatment of prisoners. Annex III is a medical report on a prisoner who had been so severely beaten around the groin that he no longer had testicles. Annex IV is a translation of a Swedish journalists interview with Felicia Langer. She describes the experience of women prisoner in Jerusalem. Also a detailed account of a 37-year-old man held at Sarafand. He was allegedly blindfolded; beaten with rifle butts; confined in chains for two days in a toilet where he could neither sit nor stand; hung by his handcuffs; beaten on his feet, his hands, his genitals; one arm chained to the wall the other to a door which was then pulled repeatedly; threatened with a large dog, electric shocks and execution. The prisoner was released after 17 days. He is quoted as saying that he had the same treatment in prison in Jordan.

In April 1970 Amnesty International published its "Report on the Treatment of Certain Prisoners under Interrogation in Israel". It concluded that there was "prima facia evidence of the serious maltreatment of Arab prisoners in Israel." A member of the Executive Committee said "We have rarely - if ever - had such reliable material on which to base the establishment of the fact in relation to torture taking place - or not taking place - in a particular country."

In 1972 the Israeli League for Human and Civil Rights, founded by Israel Shahak, issued a report on conditions in the Gaza Strip. They found that prisoners were stripped naked for long periods including during interrogation, and that prisoners had no contact with the outside for a least a month sometimes two or three. It list methods used as: a) Falaka (beating of the soles of feet). b) suspension by hands for long periods. c) holding a chair or arms above head for long periods. d) beating hands and fingers. e) leaving prisoners soaked in cold water. f) beating. g) slapping face.

In 1974 Israeli attorney Felicia Langer, and later another attorney Leah Tsemel, lodged cases with the Supreme Court against the use of torture by the GSS.

In 1977 the London Sunday Times Insight team reported that torture was being used as a "systematic deliberate policy" in six detention centers, including a special camp at Sarafand. It describes "more refined techniques" being used: electric shocks and special "small" cells in which a prisoner cannot sit or stand.

On 1 February 1978 the ICRC announced that the IDF had agreed that ICRC delegated would be permitted to visit detainees, without witnesses, after 14 days of incarceration, "even if they are still being interrogated."

Also in 1978 the American National Lawyers Guild claimed the following: beating of feet and sexual organs; burns by cigarettes; cutting body with razor blades; standing naked for long periods in hot or cold; drenching in hot or cold water; use of dogs; withholding food and blindfolding for long periods; insertion of bottles or sticks into anus; insertion of wire into penis; suspension from pulley; electric shocks.

In 1984 International Commission of Jurists published a report by Law in the Service of Man called "Torture and Intimidation in the West Bank - The case of al-Fara'a Prison." They had found that detainees were handcuffed and hooded for long periods, routinely beaten, kept in tiny cells "awash with filthy water", forced to masturbate, deprived of sleep and food, given cold showers and being forced to stand naked outside in rain at night.

==== Aftermath ====
The first study of interrogation techniques following the Landau Commission was published in March 1991 by the Israeli Human Rights organisation B'tselem: "The Interrogation of Palestinians during the Intifada: Ill-Treatment, Moderate Physical Pressure or Torture?" Based on interviews with 41 prisoners the report concluded:

"A number of interrogation methods appear to be common, even routine in the group we interviewed. Virtually all our sample were subject to: verbal abuse, humiliation and threats of injury; sleep and food deprivation; hooding for prolonged periods; enforced standing for long periods, sometimes in an enclosed space, hands bound behind back and legs tied ("al-Shabah"); being bound in other painful ways (such as the "banana" position); prolonged periods of painful confinement in small specially constructed cells (the "closet" or "refrigerator") and severe and prolonged beatings on all parts of the body, resulting in injuries requiring medical treatment."

A 1995 official report by Miriam Ben-Porat, made public in 2000, showed that Shin Bet "routinely" went beyond the "moderate physical pressure" authorised by the Landau Commission. In the report, Israel admitted for the first time that Palestinian detainees suspected of terrorism were tortured during the First Intifada, between 1988 and 1992.

A 2009 report by B'Tselem into the Shin Bet interrogation facility at Petah Tikva, based on testimony from 121 Palestinians, stated that: "In the interrogation room, detainees are forced to sit bound to a rigid chair unable to move, for hours and even days, causing intense pain in some cases. The hygienic conditions are appalling: detainees are sometimes denied showers and not given a change of clothes and toilet paper. At least some cells reek and have mould. The food is of poor quality and quantity, and detainees lose weight. During interrogation, detainees are exposed to threats, including threats against family members, and sometimes to violence. Other severe means include exposing the detainees to extreme heat and cold and depriving them of sleep."

== Web sources ==
- Interrogating Ourselves
- Torture and Abuse in Interrogation
- Israeli Use Of Painful Shackling As A Form of Torture
