= Bus 300 affair =

1984 summary execution by Israeli forces

The Bus 300 affair (Hebrew: פרשת קו 300, romanized: Parashat Kav 300, lit. 'Line 300 affair'), also known as Kav 300 affair, was a 1984 incident in which Shin Bet members executed two Palestinian bus hijackers, immediately after the hostage crisis incident ended and they had been captured.

After the incident the Shin Bet members gave false testimony on their involvement in the affair. The Israeli Military Censor blacked out coverage of the hijacking originally, but nevertheless, the publication of information regarding the affair in foreign press, and eventually in the Israeli media, led a public uproar, which led many in the Israeli public to demand that the circumstances surrounding the deaths of the hijackers would be investigated. In 1985, a senior Israeli army general, Yitzhak Mordechai, was acquitted of charges related to the deaths of the captured hijackers. Later, it emerged that members of Shin Bet, Israel's internal security service, had implicated the general, while concealing who gave the direct order that the prisoners be killed. In 1986, the Attorney General of Israel, Yitzhak Zamir, was forced to resign after he refused to call off an investigation into Shin Bet's role in the affair. Shortly afterwards Avraham Shalom, head of Shin Bet, resigned and was given a full presidential pardon for unspecified crimes, while pardons were granted to many involved before charges were laid.

Following the scandal, the Landau Commission was set up to investigate Shin Bet procedures; it found Shin Bet members routinely committed perjury in court.

== Details of the incident ==
=== Egged bus 300 hostage crisis ===
Egged bus 300 hostage crisis
- Date: 12–13 April 1984
- Attack type: hostage-taking
- Weapons: Knives, bottles of acid, a hand grenade, and a suitcase they claimed contained explosives.
- Deaths: 1 Israeli bus passenger (+ 4 attackers)
- Injuries: 8 Israeli civilians
- Perpetrator: Four Arab hijackers. Popular Front for the Liberation of Palestine claimed responsibility.

On Thursday 12 April 1984 four armed Arab guerillas from the Gaza Strip reached Ashdod where they boarded, as paying passengers, an Egged bus operating on intercity bus route No.300 which was en route from Tel Aviv to Ashkelon with 41 passengers. The Palestinians hijacked it shortly after it left the station at 7:30 pm. During the takeover, one of the bus passengers was severely injured. The hijackers stated that they were armed with knives and a suitcase containing two anti-tank rounds which they threatened to explode. The hijackers forced the bus to change its direction and drive towards the Egyptian border.

Shortly after the bus was hijacked, the hijackers released a pregnant woman from the bus south of Ashdod. She hitchhiked to a gas station and from there alerted the authorities to the hijacking. As a result, Israeli military forces began chasing the bus.

The bus, moving at 120 km/h, smashed through two primitive road blocks until Israeli soldiers fired at the bus tires and successfully managed to disable the bus near the Palestinian camp of Deir el-Balah located in the Gaza Strip, only 10 miles north of the Egyptian border. When the bus stopped, some of the passengers managed to escape from the bus through an open door.

In the ensuing stand-off members of the Israeli media began to gather at the scene. Also present were senior military officers and politicians. These included Chief of Staff Moshe Levi, Minister of Defence Moshe Arens, and the director of the Israeli domestic intelligence service Shin Bet, Avraham Shalom. Brigadier General Yitzhak Mordechai was put in charge of the rescue operation.

The hijackers, who were holding the bus passengers hostage, demanded the release of 500 Arab prisoners imprisoned in Israel and free passage to Egypt for themselves. The hijackers stated that they would not hesitate to blow up their explosive-laden suitcase and kill all the passengers on the bus.

As negotiations proceeded Shin Bet operatives on the scene quickly concluded that the hijackers were behaving like amateurs, one later stating that 'it's a bit ridiculous to call this a hostage-bargaining terrorist attack,' and that the four did not pose a risk.

=== Takeover operation ===
After lengthy negotiations, at around 7:00 am of 13 April a team of Sayeret Matkal commandos led by Doron Kempel stormed the bus while shooting at the hijackers through the vehicle's windows. During this takeover operation, the soldiers were able to kill two of the hijackers, capture the two additional hijackers, and release all hostages except for one passenger – a 19-year-old female soldier named Irit Portuguez who was killed by the IDF forces fire during the takeover operation. Seven passengers were wounded during the course of the operation.

=== Execution of two captured hijackers ===
Two hijackers were captured alive, bound and taken to a nearby field, where they were beaten by people who had gathered around them. Shin Bet chief Avraham Shalom, and the Shin Bet chief of operations Ehud Yatom, approached the bound men. Before he left the site, Shalom ordered Yatom to execute them.

"As a result, Yatom and several members of the Shin Bet took the men into a vehicle, and drove them to an isolated place, where the two were beaten to death with rocks and iron bars."

The Israeli Military Censor blacked out coverage of the hijacking. As a result, initial reports published in Israel and worldwide claimed that all hijackers were killed during the takeover. Nevertheless, three days later the Israeli daily newspaper Hadashot quoted a report from The New York Times, thus bypassing the Israeli military censor, which stated that two of the hijackers were captured alive. A few days later Hadashot published on its front page a photograph taken by Alex Levac, in which one of the hijackers was being held alive and fully conscious while taken off the bus. The publication of the photograph caused a public uproar and as a result many in the Israeli public demanded that the circumstances surrounding the deaths of hijackers would be investigated.

== PFLP claim of responsibility ==
In Damascus, Bassam Abu Sharif of the Popular Front for the Liberation of Palestine, claimed that his organisation was responsible for the attack. He said the hijackers demanded the release of 30 prisoners held at Nafha Prison in southern Israel. Israeli sources dismissed these claims accusing Fatah of being responsible.

== Subsequent related events ==
Moshe Arens, who sanctioned the operation, argued after the event that, despite casualties among the passengers, the operation was "absolutely necessary." He said: "It was a long and difficult night and we followed the policy that has been traditionally laid down by Israel that we do not give in to terrorist demands."

At 8:00 am the morning after the hijacking, IDF forces began blowing up the houses of the families of the four hijackers.

== Aftermath ==
=== The first inquiry ===
Just over a week after the hijacking David Shipler, The New York Times correspondent in Israel, filed a report revealing that the daily newspaper Hadashot had a photograph, taken by Alex Levac, of one of the hijackers being led away in handcuffs. Their journalists had positively identified the man in the picture as Majdi Abu Jummaa, aged 18, one of the four dead. The story was re-published around the world.

The story was broken in Israel on Sunday 22 April by Al HaMishmar of the Mapam party. In a lead story passed by the censor they quoted "authorized senior sources" as saying that there was no alternative to the establishment of a commission of inquiry into the deaths of the two hijackers.

On 24 April David Shipler was summoned to the office of the director of the Government press office, Mordechai Dolinsky, and was "severely reprimanded." It was believed that his Israeli press credentials were not revoked only because he was leaving his post shortly anyway.

On 25 April the weekly HaOlam HaZeh (This World), which had appeared with blank spaces the week before, published on its front page a blurred picture of a man being led away. The editor of the magazine, Uri Avnery, had overcome the censors' opposition after threatening to take the case to the High Court. Yossi Klein, editor of Hadashot, confirmed to correspondents that the man in the picture was not Majdi Abu Jammaa.

On 27 April Hadeshot was ordered to stop publishing for four days. This punishment, which had not been applied to a Jewish publication for over fifteen years, was due to their reporting that Minister of Defence Arens had set up a committee of inquiry, headed by Reserve General Meir Zorea. This information had been released to the Editors Committee of Israel's major newspapers on condition that the information was not published. Hadeshot, owned by the publishers of the respected Ha'aretz newspaper, was not a member of the Editors Committee.

Zorea's report was delivered in secret to the parliamentary Foreign Affairs and Security Committee on 29 May. Its findings were not made public but were said to have "stunned the security establishment." At the same time Hadashot refuted Moshe Arens' statement that he had not been at the scene of the hijacking by claiming that their photographer had been standing beside him shortly before he took the picture of Majdi Abu Jammaa. Concerns were also being raised about a television interview that Arens had given shortly after the event when he said: "Whoever plans terrorist acts in Israel must know that he will not get out alive." The IDF Chief of Staff, Raphael Eitan, had made a similar statement: "Terrorists must know that they will not come out alive from such an operation."

=== The trial ===
In 1985 Brigadier General Yitzhak Mordechai, who had led the storming of the bus, and eleven others were put on trial for the killing of the two prisoners. They were accused of being among a larger group who beat and kicked the prisoners to death. Witnesses described the General hitting the prisoners with a pistol. He was cleared of the charges, and the charges against the others dropped. In the spring of 1986 the deputy chief of Shin Bet, Reuven Hazak and two officials Rafi Malka and Peleg Raday, met Prime Minister Shimon Peres and accused their superior, Avraham Shalom, of having ordered the murders and coordinating the testimonies of witnesses in the case against General Mordechai. Peres refused to act on this information and the three officials were dismissed from the Shin Bet. They then gave evidence that led Attorney General Yitzhak Zamir to launch a criminal probe against the senior Shin Bet officials accused of covering up the killings. On hearing the evidence, Zamir opened a police investigation into Shin Bet actions and in particular the role of its director. In May 1986 Zamir was forced to resign amidst accusations of disregarding national security after refusing to end his investigations. His resignation was reported in the international media and Israeli newspapers were able to bypass the Military Censor with revelations about the Shin Bet. It became public that Avraham Shalom was accused of ordering the killing of the two prisoners and organising an extensive cover-up which included implicating General Mordechai.

In June 1986 a little-known judge, Yosef Harish, took over as Attorney General and President Chaim Herzog issued a blanket pardon to Shalom and four other Shin Bet officers. These pardons were challenged in the Supreme court. During the appeal papers were revealed in which Shalom asserted that all his actions were "authorised and approved." This implicated the Prime Minister at the time of the killings – Yitzhak Shamir.

On 6 August 1986 the Supreme Court upheld the pardons, but Attorney General Harish promised there would be an investigation.

=== Effects of the affair ===
The affair had significantly damaged the Shin Bet's reputation and public image in Israel. It also led to a re-examination of censorship in Israel after it became evident that the censors had contributed to the cover-up of the affair.

As part of the overall investigation of Shin Bet during the affair it was discovered that the organization routinely used physical force during interrogations which led to the establishment of the Landau Commission to investigate the organization's interrogation and other procedures.

According to Israeli journalist Gideon Levy, the people who exposed the scandal were never honoured, and those who covered up the incident went on to prestigious careers.

=== Ehud Yatom ===
In 1996 retiring Shin Bet officer Ehud Yatom gave an interview to the daily Yediot Aharonot in which he is quoted as saying: "I smashed their skulls," on orders from Shin Bet head Avraham Shalom, and "I'm proud of everything I've done." Yatom said he put the men on stretchers into a van. "On the way I received an order from Avraham Shalom to kill the men, so I killed them." "Only clean, moral hands in Shin Bet can do what is needed in a democratic state." From 2003 to 2006 Yatom was a Member of the Knesset.

== Popular culture ==
Uri Barbash directed the Kav 300 mini-series which was shown in 1997 on Israeli television. The series focused on the juridical "struggle between the Israeli Attorney General and the Shabak head following the murder of two terrorists in captivity by the Shabak". In 2011 Gidi Weitz directed Alef Techasel Otam, a documentary movie about the affair which aired to strong review and much public interest on Channel 10. The incident was also referenced in the documentary, The Gatekeepers. Rotem Shamir directed the Rescue Bus 300 docu-action film starring Daniel Gal as Irit Portuguez, produced by Keshet Broadcasting and aired on Keshet 12 on 5 May 2018.

== Sources ==
- Time: Israel Struggle At the Top, 1996
- The New York Times: Israelis Voice New Weariness At Scandal-ridden Leaders, 1987
