= The Gatekeepers (film) =

- Promotional poster
- Directed by: Dror Moreh
- Produced by: Estelle Fialon; Philippa Kowarsky; Dror Moreh
- Starring: Ami Ayalon; Avi Dichter; Yuval Diskin; Carmi Gillon; Yaakov Peri; Avraham Shalom
- Cinematography: Avner Shahaf
- Edited by: Oron Adar
- Music by: Ab Ovo; Jérôme Chassagnard; Régis Baillet
- Distributed by: Cinephil (international); Sony Pictures Classics (U.S.)
- Release date: 10 July 2012 (Jerusalem Film Festival)
- Running time: 95 minutes
- Countries: Israel; France; Belgium; Germany
- Language: Hebrew
- Budget: $1.5 million (€1.3 million)
- Box office: $2.4 million

The Gatekeepers (Hebrew: שומרי הסף, romanized: Shomrei HaSaf) is a 2012 internationally co-produced documentary film by director Dror Moreh that tells the story of the Israeli internal security service, Shin Bet (known in Hebrew as 'Shabak'), from the perspective of six of its former heads.

The film combines in-depth interviews, archival footage, and computer animation to recount the role that the group played in Israel's security from the Six-Day War to the present. The film was nominated for Best Documentary Feature at the 85th Academy Awards.

== Background ==
Moreh has explained in interviews that he was inspired to make the film after watching Errol Morris’s Academy Award-winning documentary The Fog of War. Having just completed a film about former Prime Minister Ariel Sharon, he came to realize the decisive role that the Shin Bet had played behind the scenes for the past forty years. "The idea to do this movie came to me while I was working on my previous film, Sharon. From my discussions with the prime minister’s innermost circle of advisors, I learned how the critique of some of these Gatekeepers influenced Sharon’s decision to disengage from Gaza." The problem, according to Moreh, was getting the "Gatekeepers", or former heads of the Shin Bet, to agree to appear on camera and discuss their work and opinions. Given the secretive nature of the organization, none of them had ever done this before, and many of the topics he hoped to discuss with them were either classified or highly sensitive.

Despite this initial difficulty, Moreh contacted one of the "Gatekeepers", Ami Ayalon, who had since been elected to the Knesset for the Labor Party and was serving as a Minister without Portfolio in the Security Cabinet. Much to his surprise, Ayalon not only agreed to participate, he also helped Moreh contact the other surviving former heads of the Shin Bet: Avraham Shalom, Yaakov Peri, Carmi Gillon, and Avi Dichter. The sixth participant in the film, Yuval Diskin, was still serving as head of the Shin Bet at the time.

Though all of them agreed to participate, some were reluctant initially to discuss various incidents associated with their careers. Shalom, for instance, did not want to discuss his role in the hijacking of the 300 bus and summary execution of two of the terrorists, though the ensuing scandal ultimately led to his resignation. Over time, however, and with careful prodding, he agreed to discuss even that, and it now features as one of the film's seven segments. The Gatekeepers "gave me an unprecedented, intimate opportunity to enter the inner sanctum of the people who have steered Israel’s decision-making process for almost half a century," Moreh has said.

Moreh told The Economist that after interviewing the Shin Bet heads, he decided that Netanyahu "poses a great threat to the existence of the state of Israel." He said that he seeks "to change the point of view of young Israelis. To tell them a story of the Israeli-Palestinian conflict that has not been told before."

He told The Times of Israel that making the film "changed me a lot [...]. It made me more desperate, more bleak. I saw from their eyes how our leaders really don’t want to solve this problem. They do not have the audacity, the temerity, the will, the courage that we need from a leader." He added, "I am not putting the blame only on the Israeli leaders. I think the Palestinian leaders suffer from the same horrible disease. I think that what [former Israeli foreign minister] Abba Eban said about how the Palestinians never miss an opportunity to miss an opportunity applies to both sides."

== Structure ==
The film consists of seven segments:

- No Strategy, Just Tactics – covering the emerging role of the Shin Bet from the Six-Day War and the occupation of the Palestinian territories
- Forget About Morality – about the Bus 300 affair
- One Man's Terrorist Is Another Man's Freedom Fighter – about the peace process following the Oslo Accords
- Our Own Flesh and Blood – about Jewish terrorism, including the Jewish Underground and the assassination of Yitzhak Rabin
- Victory Is to See You Suffer – about negotiations with the Palestinians during the Second Intifada
- Collateral Damage – about the assassination of Yahya Ayyash and other prominent Hamas militants
- The Old Man at the End of the Corridor – consisting of reflections on the activities of the Shin Bet and their ethical and strategic impact on the State of Israel

Though the film follows a loose chronological order, each of these segments also delves into topics such as the controversy surrounding collateral damage, the efficacy of torture, and the morality of targeted assassination.

The events described in the film are illustrated with archival footage and computer-generated imagery that brings historic photographs to life. An example of this is the computer-generated reenactment of the Bus 300 incident, based on photographs and eyewitness accounts. The film's computer animations were created by the French company Mac Guff.

== The filmmakers ==
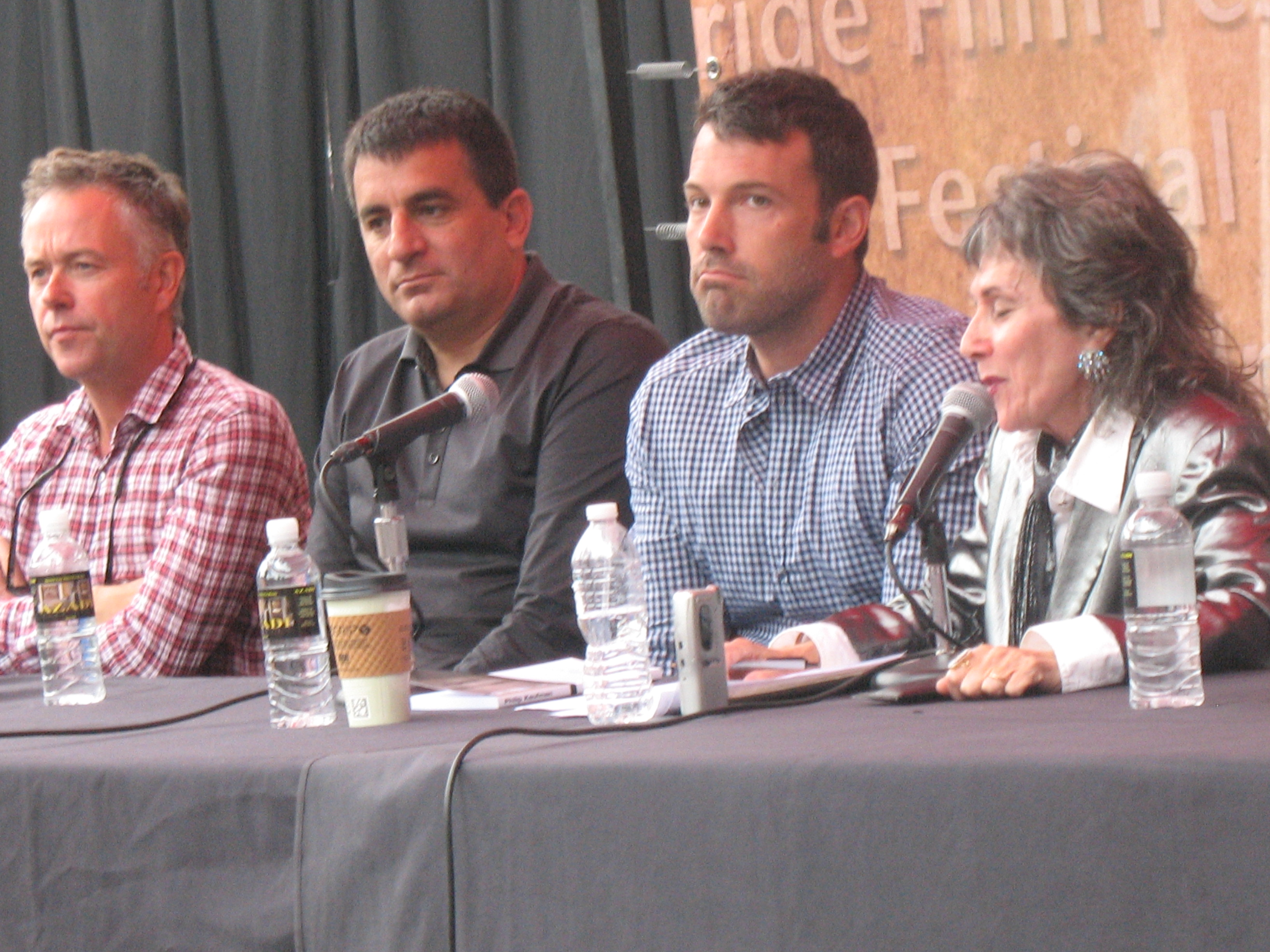
The director discussing the film at a directors' panel at the Telluride Film Festival. Left to right: Michael Winterbottom, Dror Moreh, Ben Affleck, Annette Insdorf.

The director of The Gatekeepers, Dror Moreh, is an experienced cinematographer who served as director of photography on several feature films, including Urban Feel and Desperado Square, and on a number of documentaries, among them One Shot, Asesino, and Underdog: A War Movie. His credits as a director include The Rose (a 6-part documentary series), To Be Mayumana (a documentary about an Israeli dance group), Under Cover (a 4-part docudrama about undercover police officers), Sharon (a documentary about Prime Minister Ariel Sharon's implementation of the Gaza Disengagement Plan), Occupational Hazard (a documentary about an Israeli journalist in Iraq), and Caesarea (an animated short about the history of Caesarea).

The producer, Philippa Kowarsky, is the founder of Cinephil, a film sales, co-productions, and distribution company, and has taught Media at Israel's Open University and at the Management College in Tel Aviv.

== The interviewees ==
The film consists of interviews with six former Shin Bet leaders. Avraham Shalom, who ran Shin Bet from 1980 to 1986, served on the team that brought Adolf Eichmann to justice and was forced to resign after ordering the summary execution of two terrorists. He was succeeded by Yaakov Peri, who was in charge of Shin Bet at the time of the First Intifada. Carmi Gillon, head of Shin Bet from 1994 to 1996, warned that extremists would try to kill Prime Minister Rabin; the assassination of Rabin in 1995 shook the agency's reputation and led to Gillon's resignation. Ami Ayalon, his successor, sought to increase security around Israel's leaders. Avi Dichter, Shin Bet head from 2000 to 2005, was confronted with the Second Intifada. He was succeeded by Yuval Diskin, who served until 2011.

== Release ==
Three years in production, the film was first released at the Jerusalem Film Festival in the presence of the Gatekeepers themselves. In North America, it was released on 31 August 2012 by Sony Picture Classics at the Telluride Film Festival in Colorado in the presence of Errol Morris, and a week later (6 September 2012) at the Toronto International Film Festival. It was also screened at the New York Film Festival. Its first screening in Europe took place at the International Documentary Film Festival in Amsterdam. After a one-week release in December 2012 to make it eligible for the Academy Awards, a wider theatrical release in North America began on 1 February 2013.

When the film was released, CNN reported that the former Shin Bet heads had made "stunning revelations" and that "all six argue – to varying degrees – that the Israeli occupation of Palestinian land is bad for the state of Israel." CNN noted that Avraham Shalom "says Israel lost touch with how to coexist with the Palestinians as far back as the aftermath of the Six Day War of 1967" and that a "central theme of the documentary is the idea that Israel has incredible tactics, but lacks long-term strategy." Moreh is turning "The Gatekeepers" into a five-part series for Israeli television and a book.

== Official Israeli response ==
Barak Ravid wrote in Haaretz in March 2013 that there had been much "internal debate between Israeli diplomats" over "the question of whether the film reinforces the anti-Israeli narrative in the West, or alternatively paints a more complex and positive picture of Israeli society and the internal arguments that take place within it." Mario Vargas Llosa praised the film as "evidence of the level-headedness and clarity of some elements in Israeli society."

Rafi Gamzu of Israel's Foreign Ministry called the film "proof of the highest order of Israeli democracy." Israel's deputy consul general in Toronto, Hadas Wittenberg Silberstein, described it as "a powerful film that brings viewers into confrontation with the political-security dilemmas Israel faces" and that, while "not completely unequivocal", is "tendentious in its portrayal of Palestinian suffering."

Yigal Palmor, spokesman of the Israeli Foreign Ministry, complained "that the justification for the Shin Bet’s activity in the territories does not appear in the film." While this is justifiable in a film addressed to Israeli audiences, who do not have to have the situation explained to them, international audiences "need more explanation of the background to understand how the three Shin Bet heads who appear in the film went into politics and how they are an inseparable part of a whole policy, some of which they criticize from within while agreeing completely with other aspects of it. None of them is a rebel who broke the rules and quit, or a subversive who tried to carry out a revolution. They see themselves as part of the establishment and as they see it, the purpose of their criticism is to improve it, not to smash it."

Yaakov Hadas-Handelsman, Israel's ambassador to Germany, has said that he "used the screening of the film here as an opportunity to emphasize the strength of Israeli democracy ... and the doubts that policymakers in Israel must face before they order the killing of terrorists ... There are not many democracies where one can view such a discussion at all, particularly considering Israel’s security situation."

Michael Oren, Israel's ambassador in Washington, D.C., came out strongly against the film, deploring the way in which Avraham Shalom "kind of" likens "Israel to Nazi Germany." Oren said he had "been hearing about Jews leaving the screening asking why we should keep supporting Israel."

CNN reported in January 2013 that Israeli Prime Minister Benjamin Netanyahu had "no plans" to see the film.

== Reception ==
On the aggregator Rotten Tomatoes, the film holds a 94% positive ratings from 111 critics, with an average rating of 8.3/10. The site's consensus reads: "Strikingly stark, brutally honest, and rivetingly assembled, The Gatekeepers offers essential perspective on a seemingly intractable war from some of the men who fought it." The film holds a 91/100 on Metacritic based on 27 reviews, indicating "universal acclaim". New York Times critic A. O. Scott called the film the best documentary of 2012, deeming it "essential, eye-opening viewing if you think you understand the Middle East," while Times critic Manohla Dargis named it one of the top ten movies of the year. Joe Morgenstern, film critic for The Wall Street Journal, also called The Gatekeepers one of the year's 10 best films. The film, noted Morgenstern, "brings together all the surviving directors of Shin Bet, Israel's internal security agency. What these tough and tough-minded men have to say about Israeli politicians, and the nation's current stance vis à vis its enemies, is stunning and edifying in equal measure."

The Gatekeepers was also named one of the year's best films by David Edelstein of New York Magazine, Bob Mondello of NPR, David Denby of The New Yorker, Kenneth Turan of the Los Angeles Times, Lisa Schwarzbaum of Entertainment Weekly, Manohla Dargis of The New York Times, Peter Rainer of The Christian Science Monitor, and Todd McCarthy of The Hollywood Reporter.

=== The New York Times ===
Jodi Rudoren of The New York Times described the film as offering "a disturbing narrative" whose message is that "The occupation is immoral and, perhaps more important, ineffective. Israel should withdraw from the West Bank as it did from the Gaza Strip in 2005. And the prospect of a two-state solution to the Palestinian conflict diminishes daily, threatening the future of Israel as a Jewish democracy."

=== Haaretz ===
Uri Klein, film critic of Haaretz, called The Gatekeepers "one of the most intelligent, mature and self-disciplined documentaries that have been made here recently." But Aluf Benn, the editor of Haaretz, wrote in a column that the film is "convenient for the Shin Bet," painting its chiefs as victims of the political leadership and going light on their own bending of the law."

=== The Jerusalem Post ===
In an op-ed for The Jerusalem Post, Roz Rothstein and Roberta Seid of the advocacy group StandWithUs accused the film's director of "intellectual dishonesty" and of ignoring "history and context," saying that while "the film tries to portray Israel’s antiterrorism policies as counterproductive and cruel, the interviews inadvertently tell a different story." They wrote that the film fails to acknowledge that Israel "instituted Palestinian municipal self-government and administration, introduced freedom of speech and association, and vastly modernized the Palestinian economy as well as Palestinian health, welfare and education, turning the West Bank and Gaza into the world’s fourth fastest growing economy in the 1970s and 1980s."

In addition, charged Rothstein and Seid, the viewer of The Gatekeepers "never learns that Israel has repeatedly tried to do precisely what Moreh advocates" only to have its offers of land for peace rejected repeatedly. While Moreh wishes audiences to believe that Israeli withdrawal from the West Bank would bring peace, Israel's 2000 pullout from its Lebanese security zone and its 2005 removal of Gaza settlements led to increased "threats and terrorism from Iranian proxy Hezbollah in Lebanon and from Iranian client Hamas in Gaza." Moreh ignored the "hard realities" that "make the Shin Bet’s work so crucial and so heroic."

In an op-ed for The Jerusalem Post, history professor and Zionist activist Gil Troy criticized the Shin Bet heads, for "parlay[ing] their perspective as intelligence heads into preaching and politics," and characterized Moreh's placement of Ayalon at the end of the movie as "film-making sleight-of-hand that makes his leftist views appear to be the sextet’s consensus position." Troy also noted what he called the "outrage gap": while a Jerusalem audience had "reacted viscerally to descriptions of the beating deaths of two Palestinian terrorists," it "seemed blasé about photos of suicide-bombing carnage." Troy argues, "Rabin’s assassin did not 'murder hope' – Hamas and Islamic Jihad did." Troy expressed pride that "these thoughtful, tough but human and sensitive heroes helped Israel navigate the agonizing questions the country faces in defending itself from toxic terrorists," but added that "I know of no Palestinian movies agonizing about similar dilemmas."

Troy wrote that "the film showcases Israel’s democratic vitality while seeking to undermine it." Characterizing the interviewees as "blaming Israel and robbing Palestinians of their responsibility, culpability and dignity," Troy viewed their outspokenness as a product of a "voyeuristic Facebook culture." Troy argued that "spooks should not speak," expressing doubt that "the past six CIA directors would dare so abuse their positions – and the American public’s trust."

== Honors and awards ==
The Gatekeepers was nominated for an Academy Award for Best Feature Documentary in 2013 and for the Israeli Film Academy Award for Best Documentary. It won the Golden Trailer Award for Best Foreign Documentary Trailer, won Special Mention at the Biarritz International Festival of Audiovisual Programming in 2013, won the Los Angeles Film Critics Association award for Best Documentary/Non-Fiction Film. It shared the Cinema for Peace Award for Most Valuable Documentary of the Year in 2013 with Searching for Sugar Man. It was named one of the year's top five documentaries by the National Board of Review, and won the award for Best Non-Fiction Film from the National Society of Film Critics Awards. It won second place in the Best Non-Fiction Film category at the New York Film Critics Circle Awards. It was nominated for the PGA Award for Outstanding Producer of Documentary Theatrical Motion Pictures and for Best Documentary at the Satellite Awards. It was also nominated for Best Documentary Feature Film at the 7th Asia Pacific Screen Awards.

== See also ==
- The Law in These Parts
