= Amos Manor =

- עמוס מנור
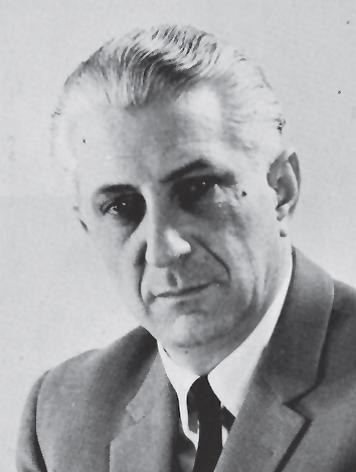
- Amos Manor – Director of Israeli Intelligence

3rd Head of the Shin Bet
- In office 1953–1963
- Preceded by: Izi Dorot
- Succeeded by: Yossef Harmelin

Amos Manor (Hebrew: עמוס מנור; October 8, 1918 – August 5, 2007) was Director of the Shin Bet, Israel's internal intelligence and security service, from 1953 until 1963.

== Biography ==
Arthur Mendelowitz (later Amos Manor) was born to a Jewish family in Sighetu Marmației, in Máramaros County, Austria-Hungary (present-day Romania). After the outbreak of World War II, he was drafted to the Hungarian Army. In 1944, he was deported to the Auschwitz concentration camp. In 1947, he joined Mossad LeAliyah Bet, an organization dedicated to smuggling Jews into Palestine in defiance of British immigration restrictions. He became secretary of its Romanian branch in Budapest. Manor served under the alias "Amos", which he later adopted as his first name. He immigrated to Israel in 1949, and joined the Shin Bet a month afterwards. Manor spoke fluent Hebrew, Yiddish, English, French, German, Romanian and Hungarian.

== Intelligence and business career ==
Manor is credited with building up the Shin Bet as a national institution capable of handling the many threats posed to internal Israeli security during that time.

In 1949, he was appointed department head of the ISA division's for non-Arab affairs, and became the first department director for Eastern Europe. In 1950 he was appointed unit head within the division for non-Arab affairs. In 1952, he was appointed Deputy ISA Director and the following year ISA Director. He retired in 1964.

In 1964 he began serving on the directorial board of several companies, banks and the stock market. He also worked as a business consultant for various textile firms and was a partner in the Atlas hotel management company.
