= Izi Dorot =

- איזי דורות
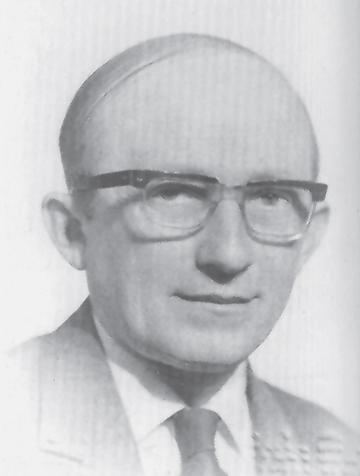

2nd Director of the Shin Bet
- In office 1952–1953
- Preceded by: Isser Harel
- Succeeded by: Amos Manor

Deputy Director of the Mossad
- In office 1953–1963

Personal details
- Born: Isidore Roth; 8 February 1916 Stanisławów, Poland
- Died: 9 February 1980 (aged 64)
- Resting place: Holon Cemetery

Izi Dorot (Hebrew: יצחק דורות; 1916–1980), born Isidor Roth, was an Israeli military official, and director of the Shabak between 1952 and 1953 and a Deputy Director of the Mossad between 1953 and 1963.

Born in Poland in 1916, Dorot immigrated to the British Mandate of Palestine in 1936, and served in the Jewish Settlement Police. In World War II he volunteered and served in the British Army. After his discharge he was recruited to the Haganah Intelligence Service. Subsequent to the 1948 Arab-Israeli War he was transferred to the Israel Security Agency (ISA, Shin Bet). After one year as Head of Shin Bet, in October 1953, Dorot followed Isser Harel to the Mossad as Deputy Director; he was replaced as Director of Shin Bet by Amos Manor. He served as deputy director of the Mossad until 1963.
