= Danny Yatom =

Israeli politician (born 1945)

- דני יתום
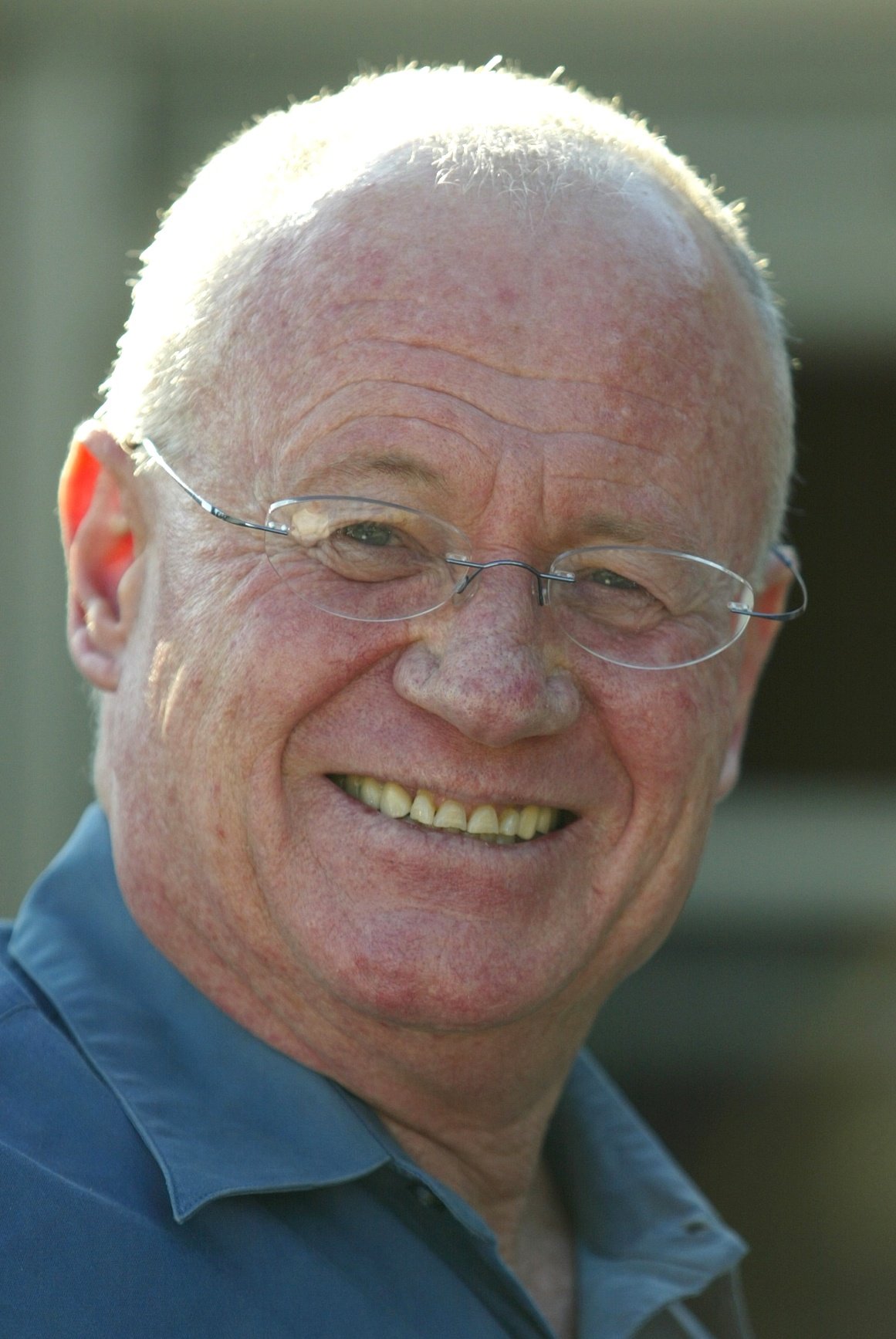

Faction represented in the Knesset
- 2003–2008: Labour

Personal details
- Born: 15 March 1945 (age 81) Netanya, Mandatory Palestine
- Occupation: Director of Mossad (1996-1998)

Danny Yatom (Hebrew: דני יתום; born 15 March 1945) is a former Israeli politician who served as a member of the Knesset for Labor. In 1996–1998, Yatom was head of the Mossad and between 1999 and 2001, he served as Prime Minister Ehud Barak's Chief Of Staff and security advisor.

== Biography ==
Danny Yatom was born and raised in Netanya, his brother is Ehud Yatom. He studied mathematics, physics, and computer science at the Hebrew University of Jerusalem. From 1963 to 1996, he served in the Israel Defense Forces and worked in the Sayeret Matkal force, rising to the position of deputy commander, after which he moved to the Armored Corps and then became the head of the Israeli Central Command, ranked Major General. In 1994, Yatom served as the IDF commander for the West Bank. As commander during the events of the cave of the Patriarchs massacre, Yatom testified before the Shamgar Commission. Between 1996 and 1998, he served as head of the Mossad.

== Political career ==
Between 1999 and 2001, he served as Prime Minister Ehud Barak's Chief Of Staff and security advisor. He then became a Knesset member and served in the 16th and 17th Knesset, from 2003 until June 2008, when he resigned from the Knesset and from Israeli politics.

In 2003, he was elected to the Knesset on Labour's list, and served as head of the committee on foreign workers, as well as chairing the lobbies for enlisted soldiers and the West Bank barrier. He retained his seat in the 2006 elections and served as head of the West Bank barrier lobby. He retained his seat in the 2006 elections, but resigned from the Knesset on 30 June 2008, stating that he was "not willing to be part of a political reality in which basic values are trampled upon, such as leading by example, ethics, and integrity". He was replaced by Leon Litinetsky.

In January 2021, Yatom announced that he would start a new political party for retirees.
