= Shin Bet =

Internal security service of Israel

Israel Security Agency שירות הביטחון הכללי جهاز الأمن العام
- Emblem of the Israel Security Agency
- Common name: Shabak
- Abbreviation: English: ISA, Local: Shabak - Hebrew: שב״כ, Arabic: شاباك
- Motto: Magen v'lo Yera'eh

Agency overview
- Formed: 8 February 1949; 77 years ago
- Preceding agency: Shai

Jurisdictional structure
- National agency: Israel
- Operations jurisdiction: Israel
- Governing body: Prime Minister of Israel

Operational structure
- Headquarters: Yarkon Park, Tel Aviv
- Agency executive: David Zini, Director

Website
- shabak.gov.il

The Israel Security Agency, (Note: ISA; Hebrew: שֵׁירוּת הַבִּיטָּחוֹן הַכְּלָלִי, romanized: Sherut ha-Bitaẖon ha-Klali, lit. 'General Security Service' (GSS); Arabic: جهاز الأمن العام, romanized: Jihāz al-Āmn al-Ami) better known by the acronyms Shabak (Note: Hebrew: שב״כ; IPA: [ʃaˈbak]; Arabic: شاباك) or Shin Bet, (Note: from the initialism "Shin + Bet" of Sherut ha-Bitaẖon, "Security Service") is Israel's internal security and counterintelligence service. Its headquarters are located in northwest Tel Aviv, north of Yarkon Park. It is one of three principal agencies of the Israeli Intelligence Community, alongside Aman (military intelligence) and Mossad (foreign intelligence).

== Organization ==
Shabak is believed to have three operational wings:

The Arab Department
responsible primarily for Arab-related counterterrorism activities in Israel, the West Bank, and the Gaza Strip.
The Israel and Foreigners Department
formerly named the Non-Arab Affairs Department. It includes the Department for Counter-intelligence and Prevention of Subversion in the Jewish Sector, also known as the Jewish Department. Since the 1980s, its main activities are collecting information about the intentions of Israeli far-right extremists to harm symbols of the government in Israel or to carry out attacks against Palestinians.
The Protective Security Department
responsible for protecting high-value individuals and locations in the country such as government officials, embassies, airports, and research facilities.

Although a security agency, it is not a part of the Israeli Ministry of Defense, and its chief answers directly to the prime minister of Israel.

== Duties and roles ==
Shabak's duties are safeguarding state security, exposing terrorist rings, interrogating terror suspects, providing intelligence for counter-terrorism operations in the West Bank and the Gaza Strip, counter-espionage, personal protection of senior public officials, securing important infrastructure and government buildings, and safeguarding Israeli airlines and overseas embassies.

== History ==
With the Israeli declaration of independence in 1948, the Shabak was founded as a branch of the Israel Defense Forces and was initially headed by Isser Harel (the father of Israeli Intelligence, who later headed the Mossad). Responsibility for Shabak activity was later moved from the IDF to the office of the prime minister. During the 1948 Arab–Israeli war, Shabak's responsibilities included only internal security affairs. In February 1949 (a short while before the end of the war), its responsibilities were extended to counter-espionage.

One of the Shabak's leading successes was obtaining a copy of the secret speech made by Nikita Khrushchev in 1956, in which he denounced Stalin. A Polish edition of the speech was provided to the Israeli embassy in Warsaw by the boyfriend of a secretary of a Polish communist official. The Shabak's Polish liaison officer conveyed the copy to Israel. The Israeli government then decided to share the information with the United States, which published it with Israeli approval. On the other hand, a study published in 2013 by Matitiahu Mayzel casts doubt on the story, arguing that the speech was not secret and that it was conveyed to the West by multiple sources, including Soviet political and intelligence agencies.

A notable achievement in counter-espionage was the 1961 capture of Israel Beer, who was revealed to be a Soviet spy. Beer was a lieutenant colonel in the reserves, a senior security commentator and close friend of Ben-Gurion and reached high Israeli circles. Beer was tried and sentenced to ten years in prison (later extended by the Supreme Court to fifteen years, following his appeal), where he died. A year before, Kurt Sitte, a Christian German from the Sudetenland and a professor in the Technion, was revealed as a Czechoslovak spy.

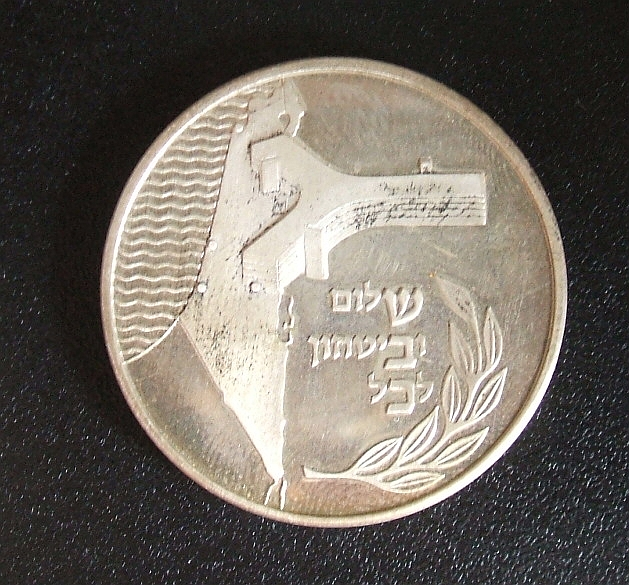
Medal given to Shabak workers on the 40th anniversary of the founding of the State of Israel, 1988

Refaat Al-Gammal was an Egyptian spy who infiltrated Israeli society for 17 years. In 2004, Haaretz published a report that alleged he was in fact a double agent. Haaretz would go on to claim that in 1967 he had provided Egypt false information about Israel's battle plans, claiming it would begin with ground operations. The Egyptians thus left their aircraft on open runways, which enabled the Israel Air Force to knock out Egypt's air force within three hours of the outbreak of the Six-Day War.

After the war, monitoring terrorist activity in the West Bank and Gaza Strip became a major part of Shabak's mission. During 1984–1986, Shabak experienced a major crisis following the Kav 300 affair in which four Palestinian militants hijacked a bus. Two of the hijackers were killed in the ensuing standoff and the other two were killed shortly after being taken into custody by Shabak officers, who later covered up the event and conspired to frame a senior IDF officer. Following the affair, Shabak head Avraham Shalom was forced to resign.

The 1987 Landau Commission, set up to investigate Shabak interrogation methods, criticized the organization and established guidelines to regulate what forms of physical pressure could be used on prisoners. Among the practices authorised were "keeping prisoners in excruciatingly uncomfortable postures, covering their heads with filthy and malodorous sacks and depriving them of sleep." Human rights groups in Israel maintained that this amounts to torture. A 1995 official report by Miriam Ben-Porat, made public in 2000, showed that Shin Bet "routinely" went beyond the "moderate physical pressure" authorised by the Landau Commission. In the report, Israel admitted for the first time that Palestinian detainees were tortured during the First Intifada, between 1988 and 1992.

In 1995, the Shin Bet failed to protect the Israeli prime minister, Yitzhak Rabin, who was assassinated by right-wing Israeli radical Yigal Amir. Shin Bet had discovered Amir's plans, and a Shin Bet agent was sent to monitor Amir, and reported that Amir was not a threat. Following the assassination, the Shabak director, Carmi Gillon, resigned preemptively. Later, the Shamgar Commission pointed to serious flaws in the personal security unit. Another source of embarrassment and criticism was the violent, provocative and inciting behavior of Avishai Raviv, an informer of the Shabak's Jewish Unit during the time leading up to the assassination. Later, Raviv was acquitted of the charges that he encouraged Yigal Amir to kill Yitzhak Rabin.

A few months after the Rabin assassination, Hamas chief bombmaker Yahya Ayyash was assassinated in a targeted killing in which an explosive device was planted in his cellular phone.

Gillon was replaced by Israeli Navy admiral Ami Ayalon, who helped to restore the organizational morale, after the debacle of the Rabin assassination, and to rehabilitate its public image.

In 2000, Ayalon was replaced by Avi Dichter, an ex-Sayeret Matkal commando and experienced Shabak agent, who tightened the working relationship with the Israel Defense Forces and Israeli police. Dichter was in charge when the al-Aqsa Intifada erupted. He turned Shabak into a prominent player in the war on terrorism after the collapse of the 2000 Camp David Summit.

In November 2003, four former heads of Shabak (Avraham Shalom, Yaakov Peri, Carmi Gillon and Ami Ayalon) called upon the Government of Israel to reach a peace agreement with the Palestinians.

In May 2005, Dichter was replaced by Yuval Diskin, who served until 2011.

In 2007, the service launched its first-ever public recruitment drive, unveiling a "slick Website" and buying on-line ads in Israel and abroad in a campaign aimed at "attract[ing] top-tier computer programmers" to its "cutting-edge" IT division. On March 18, 2008, it was announced that Shabak's official website would also offer a blog, where four of its agents would discuss anonymously how they were recruited, and what sort of work they perform; they would also answer questions sent in by members of the public. The decision to launch the blog was made by the Shin Bet's top brass, including head Yuval Diskin, and is part of an attempt to attract high-tech workers to the agency's growing IT department. According to Shabak officers, the Web site and blog are aimed also at promoting a more accessible and positive public image for the security service, long associated with "dark, undercover and even violent activity".

In 2011, Yoram Cohen was chosen as the new head of Shabak, and served until 2016.

In 2016, Nadav Argaman was chosen as the new head of Shabak, and assumed office on 8 May 2016.

On 11 October 2021, Ronen Bar was announced as the next head of the ISA, and took office on 13 October.

On 16 October 2023, following the successful surprise attacks by Hamas against Israel and the subsequent outbreak of the Gaza war, ISA director Ronen Bar took responsibility for his role in the failure of Israeli intelligence to predict the oncoming war from Gaza. A subsequent Shin Bet report also stated that Israeli government policies may have emboldened Hamas militants to attack.

In August 2024 Bar wrote to Israeli Prime Minister Benjamin Netanyahu, warning that Israel's existence is threatened by Jewish settler riots and attacks on Palestinian villages on the West Bank.

On 21 April 2025 Bar submitted an affidavit to the Supreme Court of Israel, in which he stated that Israeli Prime Minister Benjamin Netanyahu demanded personal loyalty from him, attempting to use the service capabilities for political and personal gain rather than for state security, before ultimately trying to fire him from the organization. The affidavit states that Netanyahu explicitly told Shin Bet to conduct surveillance on citizens involved in anti-government protests.

On 30 June 2026, Haaretz reported, citing activist accounts and information obtained, that Shin Bet under David Zini had increased efforts in recent weeks to recruit activists involved in anti-government protests ahead of the 2026 Israeli legislative election, offering financial incentives and other benefits in exchange for information on planned demonstrations and right-wing counterprotesters.

=== Accountability ===
Former Shin Bet director special assistant Barak Ben-Zur said that since 1948 (or more particularly 1957) the group has been brought under the control of the Knesset in order to monitor its budget. In May 2002, Shin Bet was brought under the purview of the Knesset Foreign and Security Committee, which could investigate whether it is working within legal boundaries which, in turn, involves the Constitution, Law and Justice Committee. The government legal adviser approves Shin Bet activities while the Political-Security Cabinet receives reports directly from the Shin Bet director and ensures that every detainee has the right to submit a complaint.

== Information gathering, interrogation methods and torture ==
Shabak also extracts information by interrogating suspects, and there is a history of concern over its methods. In 1987, after complaints about excessive use of violence, the Landau Commission drew up guidelines condoning "moderate physical pressure" when necessary, but in 1994, State Comptroller Miriam Ben-Porat found that these regulations were violated and senior GSS commanders did not prevent it.

Later, in 1999, the Israeli Supreme Court heard several petitions against Shabak methods, including (1) "forceful and repeated shaking of the suspect's upper torso, in a manner which causes the neck and head to swing rapidly," (2) manacling of the suspect in a painful "Shabach position" for a long period of time, (3) the "frog crouch" consisting of "consecutive, periodical crouches on the tips of one's toes," and other methods. The Court ruled that Shabak did not have the authority, even under the defense of "necessity", to employ such methods. This ruling was hailed as landmark against using torture on Palestinian prisoners.

Shabak claims it now uses only psychological means, although B'Tselem and Amnesty International continue to accuse Shabak of employing physical methods that amount to torture under international conventions. In 2015, Physicians for Human Rights–Israel noted that petitions against Shin Bet had quadrupled since 2012, and claimed that over the past several years of 850 complaints against Shin Bet for torture none had yet been investigated. It further claimed that no system of legal redress against security organizations is in place.

Shabak has also worked closely with the Israeli Air Force in "targeted killings" of field commanders and senior leaders of Palestinian militant factions of Hamas, Palestinian Islamic Jihad, the Al-Aqsa Martyrs Brigades, and Fatah. These killings are usually done by helicopter gunships. Both the IAF commanders and Shabak agents sit together in the command center to monitor the operations. Shabak's task is to give intelligence about when and where the target will be available for a strike and then react to IAF drone feedback to ensure the men at the location are indeed the correct targets.

=== Detentions ===
Salah Haj Yihyeh, a Palestinian who runs mobile clinics for Physicians for Human Rights, was detained for questioning by the Shin Bet. In the questioning, Yihyeh answered questions about the activities of the organization, its budget, the identity of its donors, and details about others employed by PHR. The board of Physicians for Human Rights, in a letter to Shin Bet chief Yuval Diskin, rejected the "crossing of a red line in a democracy." The letter argued that since the only cause for calling an employee of the group was to scare him, the tactics were unacceptable and illegal.

Palestinian journalist Mohammed Omer was detained in July 2008 by Shin Bet. Having arrived on a flight from London, Omer says that he was taken aside by a Shin Bet official. According to Democracy Now!, Omer was later questioned, strip-searched, and then beaten by eight armed Shin Bet officers. Injuries from the ordeal allegedly left Mohammed Omer in the hospital for a week. The Israeli government rejected Omer's claims outright, citing inconsistencies in his allegations and noting that such investigations are strictly regulated.

== In popular culture ==
In 2012, six former heads of the Shabak (Shalom, Peri, Gillon, Ayalon, Dichter, and Diskin) featured in a documentary film, The Gatekeepers, and discussed the main events of their tenures.

In Messiah, Tomer Sisley plays Aviram Dahan, a Shin Bet operative who is fighting terrorism to protect his country.

The film The Engineer follows the Shin Bet operation to assassinate Hamas bombmaker Yahya Ayyash.

== Directors ==
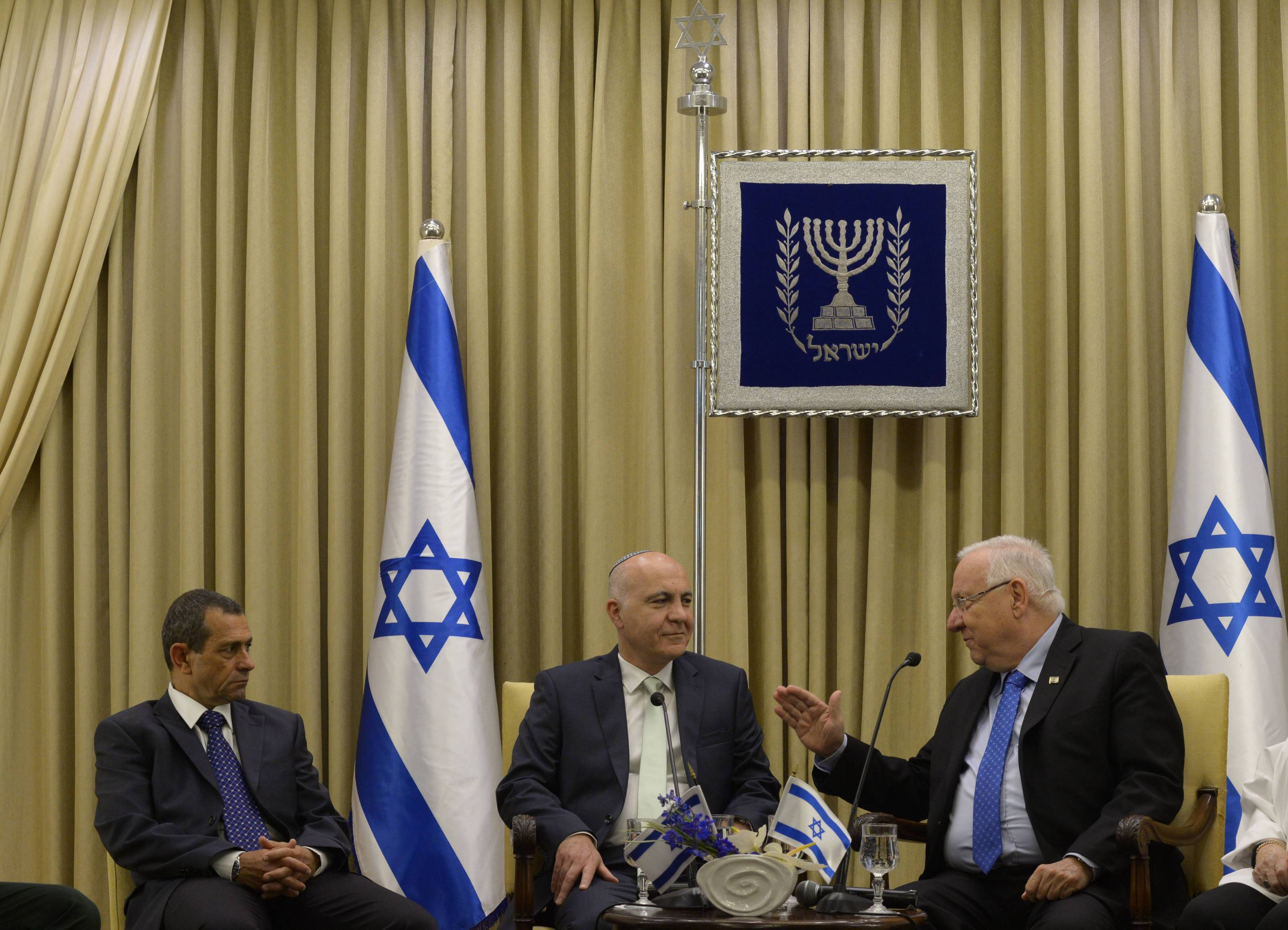
Reuven Rivlin the president of Israel with Yoram Cohen the former director of the Shin Bet and Nadav Argaman the new director. May 2016

- Isser Harel (1948–1952)
- Izi Dorot (1952–1953)
- Amos Manor (1953–1963)
- Yossef Harmelin (1964–1974)
- Avraham Ahituv (1974–1981)
- Avraham Shalom (1981–1986)
- Yossef Harmelin (1986–1988)
- Yaakov Peri (1988–1994)
- Carmi Gillon (1995–1996)
- Ami Ayalon (1996–2000)
- Avi Dichter (2000–2005)
- Yuval Diskin (2005–2011)
- Yoram Cohen (2011–2016)
- Nadav Argaman (2016–2021)
- Ronen Bar (2021 – June 15, 2025)
- (acting director) 'S' (June 16, 2025 – October 5, 2025)
- David Zini (since October 5, 2025)

== See also ==
- Aliyah Bet
- Israel Border Police
- Israeli security forces
- Population and Immigration Authority
- Yamam (National Counter-Terrorism Unit)
