= Avraham Shalom =

Israeli Intelligence officer

Avraham Shalom Bendor
- אַבְרָהָם שָׁלוֹם בֵּנְדּוֹר

Director of the Shin Bet
- In office 1981–1986
- Preceded by: Avraham Ahituv
- Succeeded by: Yaakov Peri

Personal details
- Born: 7 July 1928 Vienna, Austria
- Died: 19 June 2014 (aged 85) Tel Aviv, Israel
- Occupation: Intelligence officer
- Military career
- Allegiance: Israel
- Branch: Shin Bet
- Service years: 1950–1986

Avraham Shalom Bendor (Hebrew: אַבְרָהָם שָׁלוֹם בֵּנְדּוֹר; 7 July 1928 – 19 June 2014) was head of Shin Bet from 1981 to 1986. He resigned after being accused of ordering the killing of two Palestinian prisoners and organising the subsequent cover-up.

== Early life ==
Shalom was born in Vienna, Austria. In 1939, he moved with his family to what was then Mandatory Palestine. In 1946, he joined the Palmach and later fought in the battle of Mishmar HaEmek amongst other battles.

== Shin Bet ==
He joined the Shin Bet in 1950, and participated in the capture of Adolf Eichmann in 1960. He was eventually appointed to the head of the Shin Bet in 1980.

Shalom Bendor was one of the head of company Atwell Security in Tel Aviv, an Israeli security company staffed with high-ranking Shin Bet and Mossad agents. Peter Malkin helped to the deal which would put control of security at the World Trade Center through a contract with the Port Authority of New York in 1987. Atwell Security was a subsidiary of Eisenberg Group.

=== Kav 300 affair ===
After the hijacking of a bus from Tel Aviv on 12 April 1984, it was reported that all four hijackers had been killed. However, following publication of pictures taken at the scene it emerged that two surviving hijackers were questioned by Brigadier General Yitzhak Mordechai and then handed over to Shin Bet agents who executed the prisoners—allegedly on the orders of Shalom.

At least one witness indicated Shalom personally beat one of the prisoners to death. "Avrum was holding a pistol and he brought its butt with all of his strength on the head of one of the terrorists. I saw the butt actually entering the skull."

During the subsequent investigation, Shalom led a cover-up in the Shin Bet that implicated Mordechai as responsible for the killings. In 1985, General Mordechai was put on trial but his acquittal led to questions being asked about Shalom's role.

The cover-up caused internal disorder and dysfunction within the Shin Bet, but only became public when in May 1986 Attorney-General Yitzhak Zamir resigned after attempting to pursue a course of holding Shalom to account for falsifying evidence.

In June 1986, Shalom offered his resignation in exchange for a pardon from President Chaim Herzog. Herzog controversially issued pardons to Shalom and four other Shin Bet officers.

In July 1986, during a high court appeal against the pardons, it was revealed in a letter of application for pardon that Shalom claimed that all his actions were "authorised and approved". This placed responsibility on his immediate superior, the Prime Minister at the time, Yitzhak Shamir. Shamir denied the blame. The supreme court upheld the pardons.

After leaving the Shin Bet, Shalom became an advocate for peace with the Palestinians, criticizing prime minister Ariel Sharon's efforts to sideline Yasser Arafat. He later appeared in the film The Gatekeepers, where he described his experience in the Shin Bet.

== Death ==
Shalom died at the age of 86 on 19 June 2014 in Tel Aviv, Israel.
