= Ophir Pines-Paz =

Israeli politician

- אופיר פינס-פז
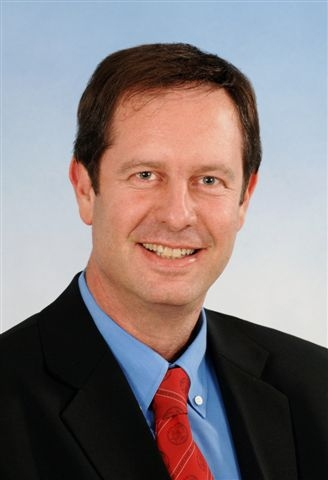

Ministerial roles
- 2005: Minister of Internal Affairs
- 2006: Minister of Science, Culture & Sport

Faction represented in the Knesset
- 1996–1999: Labor Party
- 1999–2001: One Israel
- 2001–2010: Labor Party

Personal details
- Born: 11 July 1961 (age 64) Rishon LeZion, Israel

Ophir Pines-Paz (Hebrew: אופיר פינס-פז; born 11 July 1961) is an Israeli former politician who served as Minister of Internal Affairs, Minister of Science, Culture & Sport, and as a member of the Knesset for the Labor Party from 1996 until 2010.

== Biography ==
Ophir Pines-Paz was born in Rishon LeZion, the eldest of three children. His father, Yehuda, was an optician and technologist and the Weizmann Institute of Science, who had been born in the Netherlands. He had survived the Holocaust and was a member of the Dutch resistance during World War II. His mother, Ruth, was a painter. Pines-Paz graduated from the Hebrew University of Jerusalem and holds a M.A. in Public Policy from Tel Aviv University. He served as a staff sergeant in the Israel Defense Forces from 1979 to 1982. He is currently married with two children, and lives in Ra'anana, Israel. He is a member of the Masorti congregation in Ramot, Jerusalem.

== Political career ==
Pines-Paz was first elected to the Knesset in 1996. He retained his seat in the 1999 elections, and served as chairman of the parliamentary ruling coalition and as the chairman of the One Israel faction between 1999 and 2001. From 2001 to 2003 he served as the general secretary of Labor Party.

He was re-elected again in 2003, and in 2005 was appointed internal affairs minister, serving in the cabinet until Labor pulled out of the government. After being re-elected in 2006 he was appointed minister of science, culture, and sport in Ehud Olmert's government. However, he resigned from the cabinet in November 2006 in protest against the nationalist Yisrael Beiteinu being added to the coalition; and was the only Labor Party minister to vote against the party coming into the government, stating in an interview:

"The moment the government decided to allow the inclusion of Lieberman and his party, whose leaders are infected with racist and anti-democratic statements, I am left with no other choice."

In the Labor leadership election in 2007 he came fourth in the first round, switching his support to eventual winner Ehud Barak in the second round. He came second in the party's primary elections prior to the 2009 Knesset elections, and took third place on the party list.

In January 2010 Pines-Paz announced he was retiring from politics and leaving the Labor Party, which he said "had abandoned its values over the past 15 years". His seat was taken by Einat Wilf.

He is a former chairman of the Authority for Rehabilitation of Prisoners. He also served as deputy director-general of the Immigration and Absorption Department of the Jewish Agency for Israel.

== Awards and recognition ==
In 2006 he received the "Ometz" award given by "Citizens for Good Governance and Social Justice". Previously he had been awarded the 1997 "Amitai" prize for honest management and integrity.
