= Avraham Ahituv =

Israeli civil servant

- אברהם אחיטוב
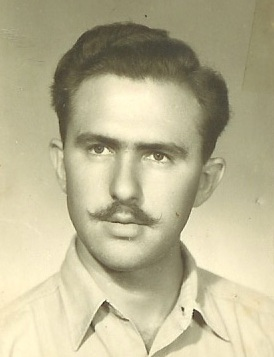
- Born: December 11, 1930; Germany
- Died: July 15, 2009 (aged 78)
- Occupation: Civil servant

Avraham Ahituv (Hebrew: אברהם אחיטוב; né Gottfried; December 11, 1930 – July 15, 2009) was an Israeli civil servant who served as director of the Shin Bet, Israel's security agency, from 1974 to 1980.

== Life ==
Ahituv was born Abraham Gottfried in Germany in 1930 and immigrated to British-controlled Mandatory Palestine with his family in 1935. In 1946 he joined the Haganah while a student in the Kfar Ha-Ro'eh seminary, where he completed high school. In 1949 he joined the Internal Intelligence Service, (SHAI), which was founded during the 1948 Arab–Israeli War and later became the Shin Bet, Israel's security agency. During the conflict period he adopted the surname Ahituv.

Through the 1950s Ahituv served in the Arab division of the Shin Bet. Ahituv was instrumental in adopting a policy of "practical moderation" in relation to the Israeli Arab demographic. This policy was to enable full integration of the Israeli Arab population into Israeli mainstream society. Ahituv authorized the use of lies in Israeli courts to cover confessions obtained by torture.

In August 1982 a controversial report appeared in The Washington Star, indicating that Ahituv's resignation was caused by the intervention of Prime Minister Begin in the investigations in the bombing of Palestinian town mayors by Jewish extremist groups. The allegation was denied by both Begin and Ahituv. After Ahituv testified that his resignation had been submitted before the spate of bombs, the Knesset defense dismissed the Washington Star report as "groundless" and having "no basis in fact".
