= Yaakov Peri =

Israeli politician

- יעקב פרי
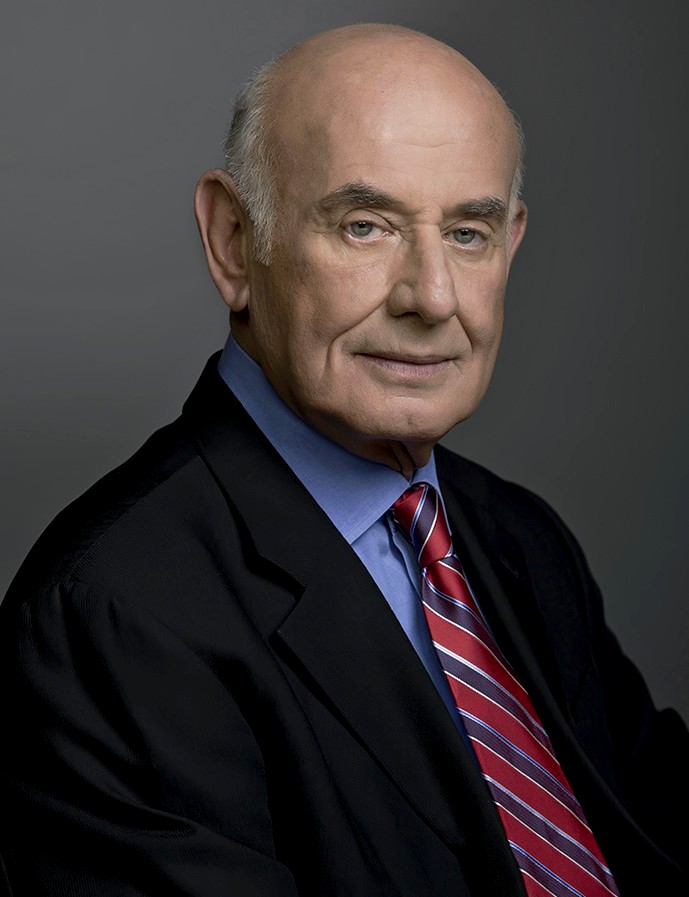

Ministerial roles
- 2013–2014: Minister of Science, Technology and Space

Faction represented in the Knesset
- 2013–2018: Yesh Atid

Personal details
- Born: 20 February 1944 (age 82) Tel Aviv, Mandatory Palestine

Ya'akov Peri (Hebrew: יעקב פרי; born 20 February 1944) is a former head of the Israeli security agency Shin Bet and formerly a member of the Knesset for Yesh Atid. He headed Shin Bet between 1988 and 1994. He was the first Shin Bet head born in Israel. After his service with Shin Bet he entered the business world. He became an member of the Knesset in 2013 and was appointed Minister of Science, Technology and Space, a post he held until resigning on 2 December 2014. He resigned from the Knesset in February 2018.

== Biography ==
Peri was born in Tel Aviv during the Mandate era, and grew up in Netanya. Before he changed his name, he was born as Yaakov Pirzoner. His parents were Yiddish speakers, originally from Poland. He was exempted from service in the Israel Defense Forces due to a systemic heart murmur. Peri attended the Hebrew University of Jerusalem and Tel Aviv University, gaining a BA. Peri started his career as an orchestral trumpeter before joining the Shin Bet.

In 1966 he joined Shin Bet, and initially trained to be a field officer working in the Arab sector. In 1972 he was appointed to a senior position in the Jerusalem, Judea and Samaria Command, and in 1975 became head of the Shin Bet's training division. In 1978 he became head of its Northern Command, before returning to the Jerusalem, Judah and Samaria Command to head it in 1981. In 1987 he became Deputy Director of the Shin Bet, before becoming Director the following year.

During his period in charge, he introduced structural changes to address problems that arose during the First Intifada, and address with the new security situation in Israel in the wake of the Oslo Accords. In 1994 he took leave to study at Harvard University, where he finished a short business management course. The following year he retired from Shin Bet. He later went into business, and also taught at Harvard. He was CEO of Cellcom Israel from 1995 until 2003, and in 2012 he featured in a documentary film, The Gatekeepers and discussed the main events of his tenure in the Shin Bet.

He joined the new Yesh Atid party prior to the 2013 Knesset elections. He was elected to the Knesset, after which he was appointed Minister of Science, Technology and Space. He was placed fifth on the party's list for the 2015 elections, and was re-elected as the party won 11 seats.

In February 2018 Peri resigned from the Knesset, after two investigative reports on the Uvda television program by Omri Assenheim exposed the fact that he had never served in the IDF and alleged that he leaked information on a corruption investigation to Aryeh Deri when he was head of Shin Bet. Peri denied having leaked information to Deri, but after initially claiming that he had never hidden the fact he did not do military service, he admitted to lying for decades about having done military service, claiming that he had lied due to the social stigma of not serving at the time. He was replaced by Pnina Tamano-Shata.

After his resignation, Peri was appointed president of the Israeli security and investigation firm, CGI group, headquartered in Tel Aviv.

In December 2019, CGI Group claimed a role in helping solve the November 2019 Dresden Green Vault burglary, though media outlets and official reports have noted these claims may be exaggerated or self-promotional. Dresden's public prosecutors and the police refuted CGI's claims, saying there is simply no evidence to support it.

In October 2025, CGI Group claimed a role in helping solve the theft of French crown jewels from the Galerie d'Apollon. The Louvre Museum explicitly denied hiring or contacting the CGI Group regarding the jewel heist.

According to the public prosecutor's office in Hamburg, Peri was involved in organizing the violent abduction of the children of Christina Block, heiress to Germany’s steakhouse chain Block House, from Denmark to Germany in 2023. Peri is said to have assembled the Israeli team that carried out the violent kidnapping. According to the prosecutors, the former head of Germany's Federal Intelligence Service (BND), August Hanning, contacted Perry on Block's behalf and asked him to put together a team to kidnap her children from their father. An alleged Israeli participant was extradited from Cyprus to Germany and brought to court. Two other suspects from Israel remain at large.

Peri is a fluent Arabic speaker, having learned it in school and during his Shin Bet service.
