= Alon Nisim Cohen =

Israeli inventor, entrepreneur and novelist

- אלון ניסים כהן
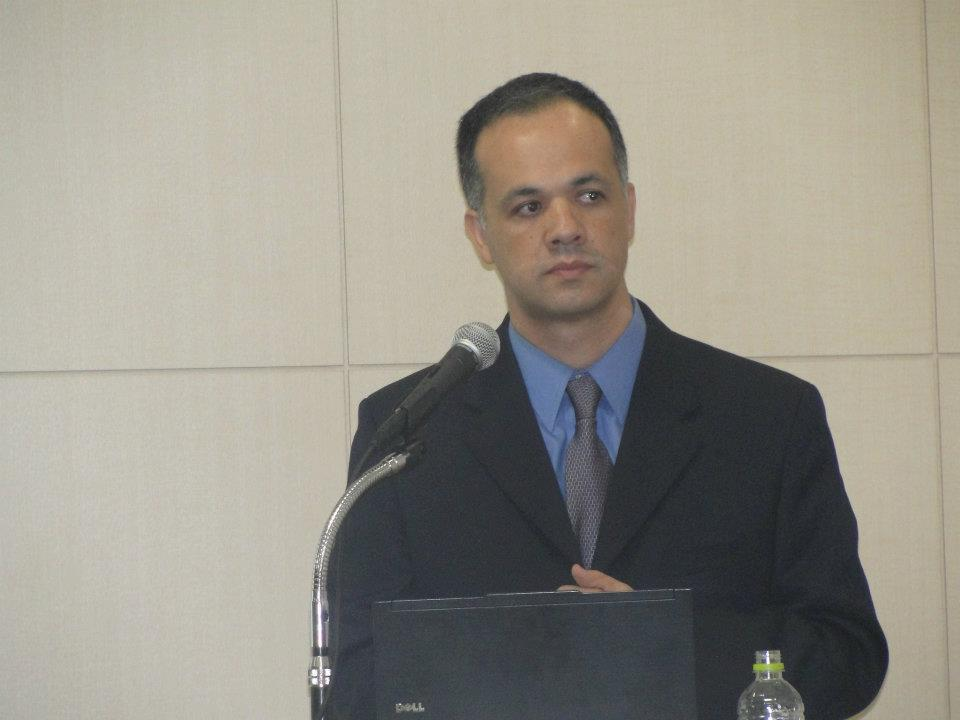
- Cohen speaking at a press conference in Tokyo, October 2011
- Born: 1968 (age 57–58); Jerusalem, Israel
- Occupations: Founder, former chairman and CEO of CyberArk Software Ltd.

Alon Nisim Cohen (Hebrew: אלון ניסים כהן; born 31 May 1968) is an Israeli inventor, entrepreneur, and novelist. He is the founder and the first CEO of the cyber security company CyberArk Software Ltd., which was acquired on July 30th 2025 by Palo Alto Networks for 25 Billion Dollars.

Alon has served as the company's Executive Chairman for 14 years (1999–2012) and as the first CEO for 6 years (1999–2004).

== Biography ==
Cohen was born in Jerusalem. During his military service he was part of the Israel Defense Forces' central computing system unit, Mamram, where he served in various positions for six years. In 1999, a few years after his military service ended, Cohen founded CyberArk together with his high-school friend Udi Mokady. That year, Cohen invented and patented the Network Vault, which serves as the basis for all of CyberArk’s products in the fields of cyber security, data security and digital warfare. Cohen was CyberArk’s chief executive officer and later its chairman of the board of directors for 14 years.

In 2004 Cohen took control over FilesX Inc., a data storage company, and served as chairman of the board and acting CEO. The company was acquired by IBM in April 2008.

In December 2011, Goldman Sachs and Jerusalem Venture Partners acquired a stake of CyberArk from Cohen and some other investors and took the company public in the Nasdaq stock market.

Cohen founded a startup company Muvix Media Networks Ltd. around 2017.
