= Magna International =

Canadian automotive supplier

Magna International Inc.

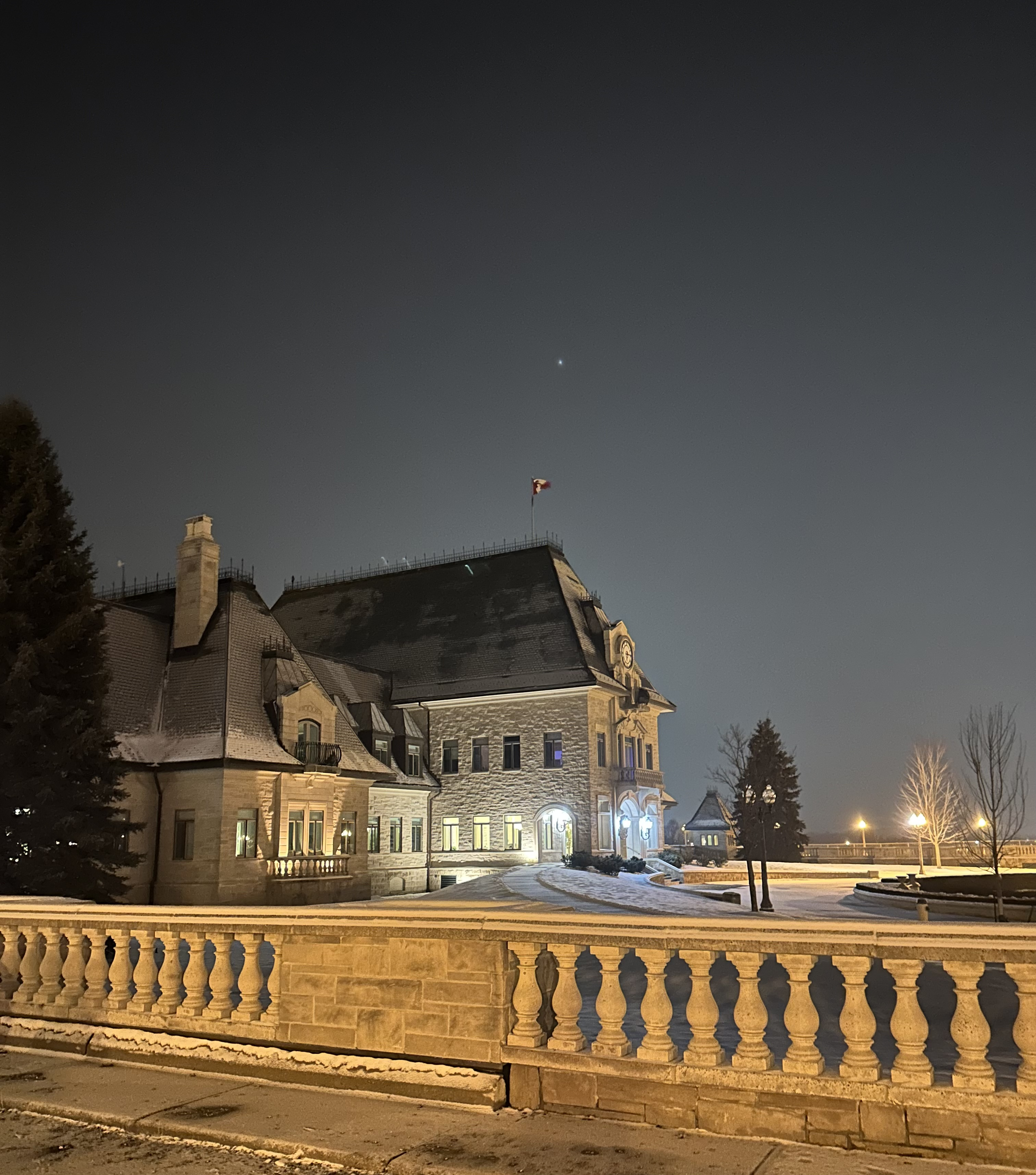
- Magna International headquarters in Aurora, Ontario, Canada.
- Type: Public
- Traded as: NYSE: MGA; TSX: MG
- Industry: Automotive
- Founded: 1957; 69 years ago
- Founder: Frank Stronach
- Headquarters: Aurora, Ontario, Canada
- Area served: Worldwide
- Key people: Swamy Kotagiri, CEO; John H. Farrell, Executive VP & COO; Patrick W.D. McCann, Executive VP & CF
- Products: Automotive
- Revenue: ▲US$42.797 billion (2023)
- Operating income: US$1.606 billion (2023)
- Net income: US$1.213 billion (2023)
- Total assets: US$ 32.255 billion (2023)
- Total equity: US$13.234 billion (2023)
- Number of employees: 179,000 (2023)
- Subsidiaries: CTS Fahrzeug-Dachsysteme; Magna Powertrain; Magna Steyr
- Website: www.magna.com

Magna International Inc. is a Canadian automotive supplier. It is one of the largest companies in Canada and was recognized on the 2020 Forbes Global 2000. The company is the largest automobile parts manufacturer in North America by sales of original equipment parts; it has ranked consistently in the Fortune Global 500 list for 20 years in a row since 2001. It produces automotive systems, assemblies, modules, and components, which are supplied to General Motors, Ford and Stellantis, as well as BMW, Mercedes, Volkswagen, Toyota, Tesla, and Tata Motors, among others.

The company is headquartered in Aurora, Ontario, and its chief executive officer is Swamy Kotagiri. It has 158,000 employees in 342 manufacturing operations and 91 product development, engineering and sales centres in 27 countries. Magna is governed under a corporate constitution which calls for distribution of profits to employees and shareholders. The terms of this contract are a "fair enterprise system" according to company founder Frank Stronach.

== History ==
In 1957, Frank Stronach founded Multimatic Investments Ltd in a tool-and-die rented garage out of Toronto. Its first automotive industry contract for metal sun visor brackets was with General Motors in 1959.

By the late 1960s, the company was operating in eight plants. Stronach took Multimatic Investments public in 1969 through a merger with Magna Electronics Corporation, an aerospace, defence and industrial components company, and became known as Magna International in 1973.

The company developed an employee equity participation and profit-sharing program in 1974. By 1981, Magna had sold its aerospace and defence operations to focus on the automotive industry. It began decentralizing major systems into independent, publicly traded companies during the 1990s, while expanding into Asia.

In 2005, Magna began designing automotive rearview cameras—which were not federally mandated at the time—for Hummers on its production line in Michigan, US. It was one of the first to develop rearview cameras for automakers, and had a 350,000 unit contract by 2007. By 2019, the company had produced more than 46 million components and opened a $66.5 million plant to produce cameras and driver-assistance units.

In February 2015, Samsung SDI agreed to purchase the battery pack business from Magna Steyr, an Austrian operating unit of Magna International, for $120 million. Magna International partnered with Argus Cyber Security after joining in a 2015 Series B funding round to access the company's security technology. The company sold its interiors business, which included door and instrument panels, overhead systems and cargo management parts, to Grupo Antolin in August 2015. The sale to Grupo Antolin included 36 plants and 12,000 employees in Europe, North America and Asia, about 10 percent of Magna's global workforce at the time. The operations had generated sales of $2.4 billion in 2014.

In March 2018, Magna announced they would work together with the ride-share company Lyft to supply high-tech kits that turn vehicles into self-driving cars. The company invested $200 million into the project and both parties would jointly own the intellectual property developed. It was also noted that Magna would be Lyft's exclusive supplier of self-driving kits. Magna announced a partnership with BAIC Group in June 2018 to develop "next-generation" smart electric vehicles for Chinese consumers. Donald J. Walker, who joined Magna in 1987, retired as CEO at the end of 2020, with Swamy Kotagiri replacing him in January 2021.

In February 2021, the office of the governor of the state of Michigan announced that Magna planned to open a facility in the city of St. Clair to build battery enclosures for the 2022 GMC Hummer electric pickup. The battery enclosures would be produced at General Motors' facility in Detroit and Hamtramck. The new facility was expected to cost $70 million and to create over 300 jobs for the state. An electric version of the Ineos Grenadier off-road utility vehicle was to be developed by Ineos and Magna, scheduled to enter production in Graz, Austria in 2026.

== Corporate affairs ==
Magna International Inc. (full name as certified under the Ontario Business Corporations Act) is headquartered in Aurora, Ontario, and has 342 manufacturing operations and 91 product development, engineering and sales centres in 27 countries. Its United States operations are headquartered in Troy, Michigan and its European head office is in Vienna, Austria.

Magna is governed under a corporate constitution, and requires consensus from management, shareholders and employees to make any changes. The company shares 10 percent of pretax profits with its employees. As of 2019, the company has 158,000 employees.

=== Acquisitions ===
In 2002, Magna International announced that it had reached an agreement with DaimlerChrysler to acquire the latter's Austrian-based Eurostar Automobilwerk operation.

Magna acquired 80% of New Venture Gear, a former joint venture between General Motors and Chrysler, in September 2004, and combined it into Magna Powertrain. It assumed full ownership in 2007, closing the operation in August 2012.

In October 2004, Magna announced its intention to unwind the legacy public offerings it had made of three divisions that it spun off as standalone companies in past years: Tesma International Inc. (initial public offering (IPO) in 1995), Decoma International Inc. (IPO in 1997) and Intier Automotive Inc. (IPO in 2001). Magna made offers to the boards of the three companies, with an expected total cost to Magna of CA$1.3 billion (equivalent to $2.0 billion in 2025) in cash and Magna shares, to privatize the companies within Magna International. The three privatizations were completed in February (Tesma and Decoma) and April (Intier) of 2005.

Magna purchased CTS Fahrzeug-Dachsysteme, a supplier of convertible roofs, from Porsche in November 2005.

In July 2015, Magna bought the German company Getrag, which was one of the largest suppliers of automotive transmissions worldwide for $1.9 billion. The acquisition worked to increase growth potential in the Chinese market.

In 2018, the company acquired Haptronik GmbH, a German motion control software developer, OLSA S.p.A., an Italian automotive lighting manufacturer, and Viza Geca SL, a Spanish automotive seating company. It partnered with Innoviz Technologies to produce solid-state lidar for autonomous vehicles for BMW Group.

Magna acquired Boston startup Optimus Ride and its more than 120 employees in January 2022.

In December 2022, it was announced Magna has acquired the Stockholm-headquartered Veoneer Active Safety business from SSW Partners for US$1.52 billion.

==== Groups ====
As of 2024, Magna International consists of seven groups, which hold further corporate subsidiaries and subdivisions:

- Cosma
- Magna Electronics
- Magna Powertrain
- Magna Exteriors
- Magna Seating
- Magna Steyr
- Mechatronics, Mirrors & Lighting

== Technology ==
During its history, Magna International has worked with automakers to advance vehicle safety and technology such as smart mobility seating systems including stow-into-floor minivan seats, exterior systems including reaction injection moulding (RIM) bumpers, advanced driver assistance systems (ADAS), blind-spot detection and lane departure warning systems. The company is the largest automobile parts supplier in North America and the third largest worldwide.

It uses mobility technology to develop customized computing for fully automated driving systems. In 2018, it introduced an Icon radar system to help automakers reach Level 5 autonomy as well as automatic emergency braking systems. Magna has partnered with BMW on electrification to produce electric cars on a contract basis. The company is also known for using new materials for "lightweighting" vehicles. In 2017, Goldman Sachs reported that automated features developed by suppliers such as Magna were expected to support a 42 percent compound annual growth rate in global revenue over the following decade.
