= Talon Cyber Security =

Israeli cybersecurity technology provider

- Type: Private
- Industry: Software development; Cybersecurity; Technology
- Founded: 2021; 5 years ago
- Founders: Ofer Ben Noon (CEO); Ohad Bobrov (CTO)
- Owner: Palo Alto Networks; (2023–present)
- Number of employees: 130
- Website: www.talon-sec.com

Talon Cyber Security is an Israel-based provider of cybersecurity technologies with headquarters in Tel Aviv. It develops a secure browser engineered to provide enterprise-grade security across all devices, irrespective of location, device type, or operating system.

== History ==
Talon Cyber Security was founded in 2021 by Ofer Ben Noon (the founder of Argus Cyber Security, an Israeli developer of security technologies for vehicles) and Ohad Bobrov (the founder of Lacoon Mobile Security, which specializes in security for mobile telephones).

In April 2021, the company raised a $26,000,000 seed round, which became the biggest seed round in Israel. The company also announced an investment from John W. Thompson, former chairman of the board at Microsoft and ex-CEO of Symantec; George Kurtz, co-founder of CrowdStrike; and Mark Anderson, formerly the president of Palo Alto Networks.

In October 2021, it launched the security-focused browser Talon Enterprise Browser. Talon was listed in Israel's Globes Most Promising Startups of 2021.

In January 2022, Talon Cyber Security announced that it raised $43 million in new funding, including $17 million in agreement for future equity investments.

In May 2022 the company appointed Admiral Mike Rogers, a retired United States Navy admiral who served as the second commander of the United States Cyber Command as well as the director of the National Security Agency (NSA) and the chief of Central Security Service (CSS) to its Board of Advisors. In August 2022, Talon Cyber Security raised $100,000,000 in Series A funding.

In 2023, Talon Cyber Security announced that it has integrated its secure enterprise browser with the Microsoft Azure OpenAI Service to provide enterprise-grade ChatGPT access.

In November 2023, Palo Alto Networks Inc. (NASDAQ: PANW) announced an intent to acquire Talon Cyber Security Ltd. for $625 million. On December 28, PANW reported having completed the purchase of the company.

== Operations ==
Talon Cyber Security focuses on addressing the security needs of the distributed workforce. The company's main product is a secure browser that provides security and enables access to corporate applications and data across various devices, managed or unmanaged, and operating systems. Talon's browser is based on Chromium. Via a management console, Talon's browser allows businesses to apply their own policies across their employees’ browsers and get data on what workers are doing on the Web while working.

The company is based in Tel Aviv, Israel. Ofer Ben-Noon is co-founder and serves a company's CEO, Ohad Bobrov is co-founder and serves as CTO.
