= Adallom =

Israeli technology company

Adallom, Inc.
- Type: Private
- Industry: Cloud security
- Founded: 2012
- Founder: Assaf Rappaport, Ami Luttwak, Roy Reznik
- Fate: Acquired by Microsoft
- Successor: Microsoft
- Headquarters: Menlo Park, California, United States
- Area served: Global
- Key people: Assaf Rappaport, Ami Luttwak, Roy Reznik
- Products: Adallom
- Services: SaaS security monitoring, user activity auditing, threat protection
- Parent: Microsoft

Adallom was a cloud security company based in Menlo Park, California. It secured enterprise software-as-a-service (SaaS) application usage, audited user activity, and protected employees and digital assets from threats.

Adallom was acquired by Microsoft for $320 million in July 2015. The Adallom product was rebranded as Microsoft Cloud App Security (MCAS) and announced in general availability as of April 2016. In November 2021, Microsoft Cloud App Security was rebranded as Microsoft Defender for Cloud Apps.

== History ==
Adallom was founded in 2012 by Assaf Rappaport, Ami Luttwak, and Roy Reznik, former members of the Israeli Intelligence Corps Unit 8200 and alumni of the Talpiot program. Adallom’s name comes from Ad Halom (עד הלם), “the last line of defense.” (It means 'until here' or 'until today' in direct translation, and is biblical Hebrew.) In 2013, the founding team was joined by Michael Nicosia. Adallom secured $4.5 million in Series A funding from Doug Leone of Sequoia Capital and Zohar Zisapel. The company secured $15 million in series B funding led by Index Ventures with contributions from Sequoia Capital Israel.

Adallom was named by CRN as the 10 Coolest Security Startups of 2013.

Following Adallom's acquisition by Microsoft, its co-founders went on to work together again, cofounding Wiz, Inc.

== Product ==
The founders created Adallom with the idea that SaaS as a class is secure, but the way employees utilize SaaS is not. In November 2013, Adallom launched a security service that audited activities performed in SaaS applications and developed intelligence to defend against security issues. It provided tools to build a consistent security policy across all cloud applications in use within an enterprise.

Adallom’s Smart Engines technology worked similarly to the way credit card companies track transactions that appear out of the ordinary stopping attacks with near-real-time reports of suspicious behavior.

In December 2013, Adallom discovered and reported a token hijacking vulnerability (CVE-2013-5054) in Microsoft Office 365. This identity theft vulnerability allowed attackers to grab user identities and steal email and documents. The problem was reported by Noam Liran, chief software architect at Adallom, and the fix was addressed in Microsoft Security Bulletin MS13-104.
