= 8200 =

8200 may refer to:

- The year 8200 CE.
- Unit 8200, the signal intelligence unit of the Israel Defense Forces.
