= Talpiot program =

Israeli Defense Force training program

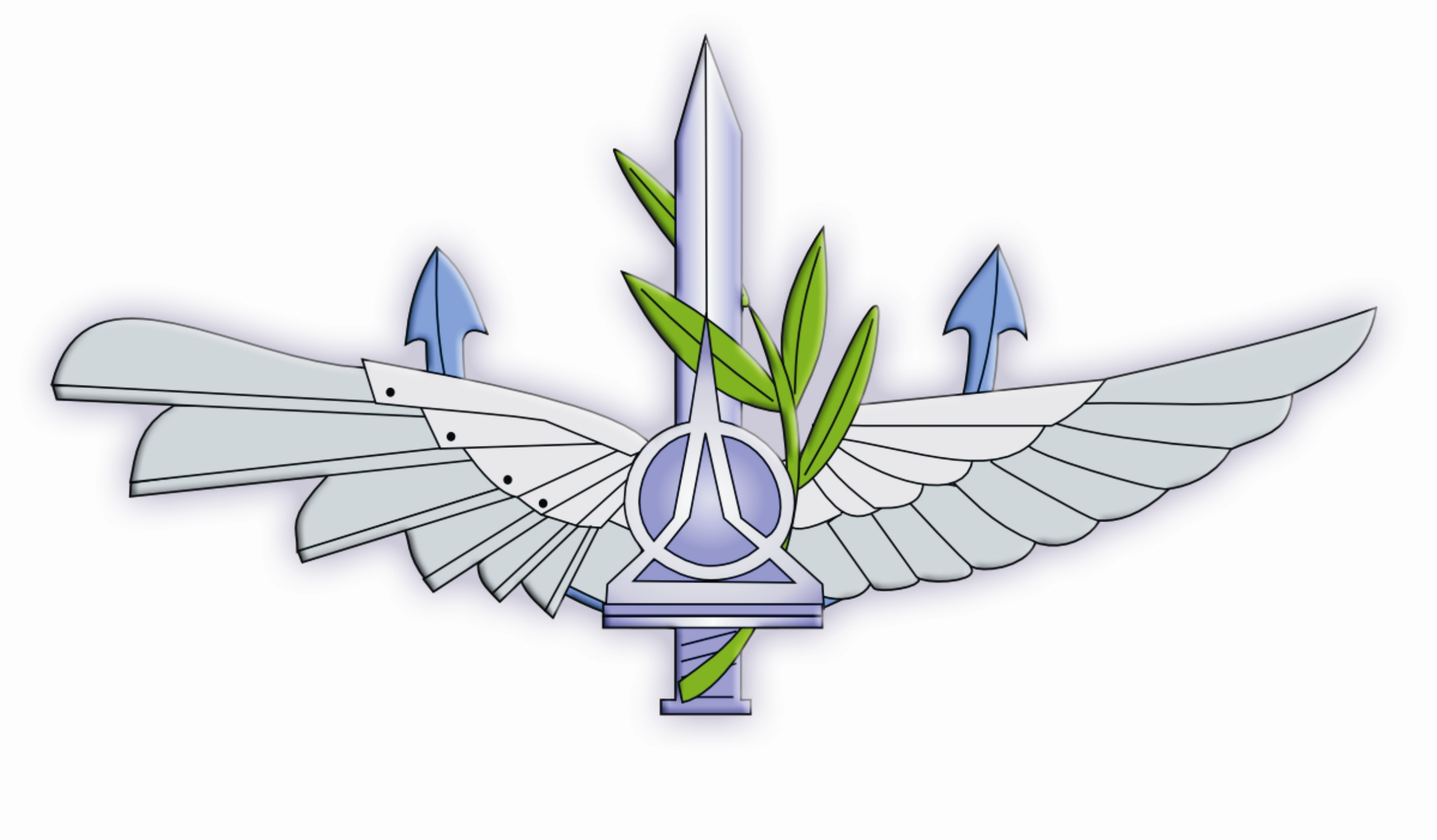
Symbol of the Talpiot program

Talpiot program (Hebrew: תוכנית תלפיות) is an Israel Defense Forces (IDF) training program for recruits selected for ability in the sciences and leadership potential. Graduates pursue double higher education while they serve in the army, and they use their expertise to further IDF research and development in technological leadership positions. The program was inaugurated in 1979.

== History ==
The initiators of the program were Professor Felix Dothan and Professor Shaul Yatziv of the Hebrew University, who submitted the idea to the Israeli chief of staff Rafael Eitan. The idea was to harness human creativity, which peaks early, to develop new technologies for the army. The program is sponsored by the Israeli Air Force and IDF Administration for the Development of Weapons and the Technological Industry, and run under the auspices of the Hebrew University of Jerusalem.

== Program ==
During their initiation period, the cadets study for their B.Sc. in physics, mathematics or computer science at the Hebrew University in Jerusalem in Air Force uniform, while also undergoing different periods of field training designed to familiarize them with all branches of the IDF (infantry level 04 basic training, combat engineering course, armored corps course, artillery corps course, instruction in military tactics etc.). At the end of the course, which lasts 40 months, the cadets receive the rank of first lieutenant (segen) and a B.Sc. and become integrated in research and development in the IDF and Israel Military Industries, or in various combat positions, if they so choose.

In addition to the three years obligated by Israeli law, the program includes six years of standing army service in a wide variety of positions. The total program, including military service, is nine years.

The first class had 25 cadets. Later, the class was increased to 50–60. The applicant pool consists of nearly 10,000 top scorers on a test taken by all graduating high school seniors. 300 potential applicants are then subjected to a two-day series of tests. These include further IQ exams, as well as group tasks designed to test one's social dynamics, all conducted under the supervision of trained psychologists and military personnel. For example, teams of applicants are given a specific task, then the instructions are changed while the test is in progress, such as shortening the allotted time or changing the assigned tasks. Final acceptance into the program requires a high security clearance rating, as determined by the Air Force.

The book Israel's Edge: The Story of the IDF's Most Elite Unit – Talpiot, by Jason Gewirtz, was published by Gefen Publishing House in 2015.

A study by Omer Doron, a Talpiot graduate, and Ilya Strebulaev of Stanford University, reported by Globes in April 2026, found that about 25 percent of graduates became entrepreneurs and about 3 percent founded a company valued at more than $1 billion.

== Notable alumni ==
- Uri Alon – professor of systems biology at the Weizmann Institute
- Yoav Freund – professor at the University of California, San Diego, and Gödel Prize winner
- Elon Lindenstrauss – professor of mathematics at the Hebrew University and winner of the 2010 Fields Medal
- Avi Loeb – Israeli-American theoretical physicist at Harvard University
- Daniel Ramot, Oren Shoval – founders of Via
- Assaf Rappaport, Ami Luttwak and Yinon Costica – co-founders of Wiz

== See also ==
- Psagot program – A sister elite program managed under the DDR&D's joint Talpiot-Psagot Brigade.
- Havatzalot Program – Elite program in the Israel Defense Forces
- Recruit training in the Israel Defense Forces – Basic training in the Israeli military
- Technion – Israel Institute of Technology – Israeli research university in Haifa
- Unit 81 – Secret technology unit of the Israeli Defense Forces
- Unit 8200 – Intelligence unit of the Israel Defense Forces
- Unit Matzov – Cybersecurity directorate of the Israel Defense Forces
