= Assaf Rappaport =

Israeli entrepreneur and cybersecurity executive (born 1983)

- אסף רפפורט
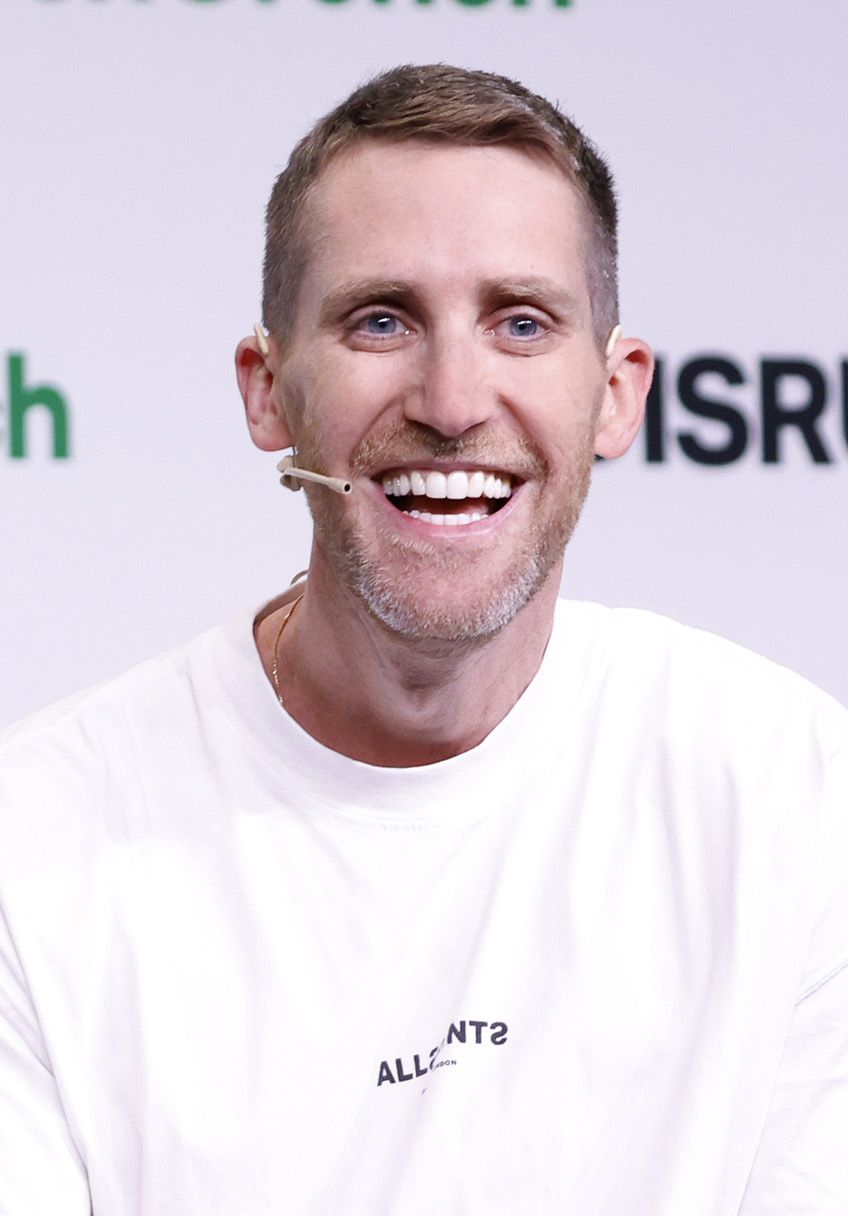
- Rappaport in 2024
- Born: 28 August 1983 (age 43); Tel Aviv, Israel
- Education: Hebrew University of Jerusalem (BSc); Technion – Israel Institute of Technology (MSc)
- Occupations: Entrepreneur, cybersecurity executive
- Known for: Co-founder and CEO of Wiz; co-founder of Adallom

Assaf Rappaport (Hebrew: אסף רפפורט; born 28 August 1983) is an Israeli businessman. He previously worked as the head of Microsoft's Israel research and development center, and is a co-founder of the cybersecurity companies Adallom and Wiz. Adallom was acquired by Microsoft in 2015 for $320 million, and Wiz by Google in 2026 for $32 billion. At the time of the deal, Wiz was the largest acquisition in Google's history, and the largest of all Israeli technology company. In 2026, The Jerusalem Post ranked Rappaport seventh on its annual list of the 50 most influential Jews.

== Early life and education ==
Rappaport was born on 28 August 1983, in Israel. He graduated from the Hebrew University of Jerusalem with a bachelor's degree in computer science, physics, and mathematics. He later earned a master's degree (MSc) in computer science from the Technion – Israel Institute of Technology.

Rappaport enlisted for mandatory service in 2001. He joined IDF's Talpiot program. After finishing Talpiot, he served in Unit 81, a top-secret technological unit, and then served as a captain in Unit 8200, the IDF’s cyber and signal intelligence corps. During this time, he met Roy Reznik, Ami Luttwak, and Yinon Costica, who became his business partners.

== Career ==
=== Early roles ===
After his military service, Rappaport briefly worked as a consultant at McKinsey & Company before starting his own cybersecurity venture.

=== Adallom (2012–2015) ===
In 2012, Rappaport co-founded Adallom, a cloud access security broker (CASB), with Ami Luttwak and Roy Reznik. Adallom specialized in protecting data in software-as-a-service (SaaS) applications. Microsoft confirmed its acquisition of the company on 8 September 2015. It did not disclose the price, and press reports put it between $250 million and $320 million.

=== Microsoft (2015–2020) ===
Following the acquisition, Rappaport and his co-founders moved to Microsoft. At the age of 34, he was appointed head of Microsoft’s Israel Research & Development Center. He also led the company’s Cloud Security Group, working to improve security offerings within Azure.

=== Wiz (2020–present) ===
==== Founding and early growth ====
In 2020, Rappaport left Microsoft to co-found Wiz with Ami Luttwak, Roy Reznik, and Yinon Costica. Wiz provides a platform for real-time security risk assessment across multiple cloud environments, including Amazon Web Services (AWS), Azure, and Google Cloud. The company aimed to offer a cloud security platform capable of scanning across major cloud providers.

Wiz reached a valuation of $1.7 billion in early 2021 and $12 billion in May 2024. Venture capital firms such as Sequoia Capital, Index Ventures, Insight Partners, and prominent tech executives participated in the funding rounds, making Wiz one of the fastest-growing software-as-a-service companies on record. According to various sources, Wiz reached $100 million in annual recurring revenue within 18 months of operation.

==== Acquisition by Google ====
By 2024, Wiz served 40% of Fortune 100 companies. In mid-2024, reports suggested that Alphabet was interested in acquiring Wiz. Although Rappaport initially rejected an offer of about $23 billion to explore an initial public offering (IPO), negotiations resumed amid a weakening IPO market. On 18 March 2025, Alphabet announced it had entered into an agreement to acquire Wiz for $32 billion in cash, subject to regulatory approvals. The deal, if finalized, would be the largest in Google’s history, as well as the largest acquisition of an Israeli technology company. Wiz is expected to be integrated under Google Cloud while retaining its independence in serving multi-cloud customers. With an estimated 10 percent stake in the company, Rappaport is expected to make over $3 billion before taxes once the acquisition is finalised.

== Recognition ==
Rappaport has been included multiple times in The Jerusalem Post's annual list of the 50 most influential Jews. In 2023, he was ranked 20th alongside Israeli technology executives Michal Braverman-Blumenstyk, Ori Goshen, and Guy Franklin, who were recognized collectively for their roles in Israel's technology sector.

In 2024, Rappaport was ranked 33rd alongside Asaf Kochan and Ofer Yannay as representatives of Israel's high-tech sector. In 2025, Rappaport and his fellow Wiz co-founders Yinon Costica, Roy Reznik, and Ami Luttwak were ranked 10th.

In 2026, Rappaport was ranked individually at number seven on the list. The Jerusalem Post cited his leadership of Wiz and Google's $32 billion acquisition of the company in discussing his influence.

== Personal life ==
Rappaport came out as gay at a young age and is in a long-term relationship with Ophir, a former educator who now works in the high-tech sector. He became the first CEO in Israel to introduce surrogacy grants for both same-sex and heterosexual couples at Wiz. Rappaport is known for his preference for simplicity and convenience over material wealth. He chooses public transportation over owning a car, citing parking difficulties in his area. His leadership style is described as unconventional, engaging with employees as equals and typically dressing casually in jeans, sneakers, and a t-shirt. Rappaport is also recognized for his outspoken political views. He has actively participated in protests against the Israeli government’s controversial judicial reform efforts. In response to these reforms, he announced that Wiz would transfer funds out of Israel, retaining only what was necessary for salaries and essential operations.
