= Daniel Ramot =

Israeli-born American entrepreneur

- דניאל רמות
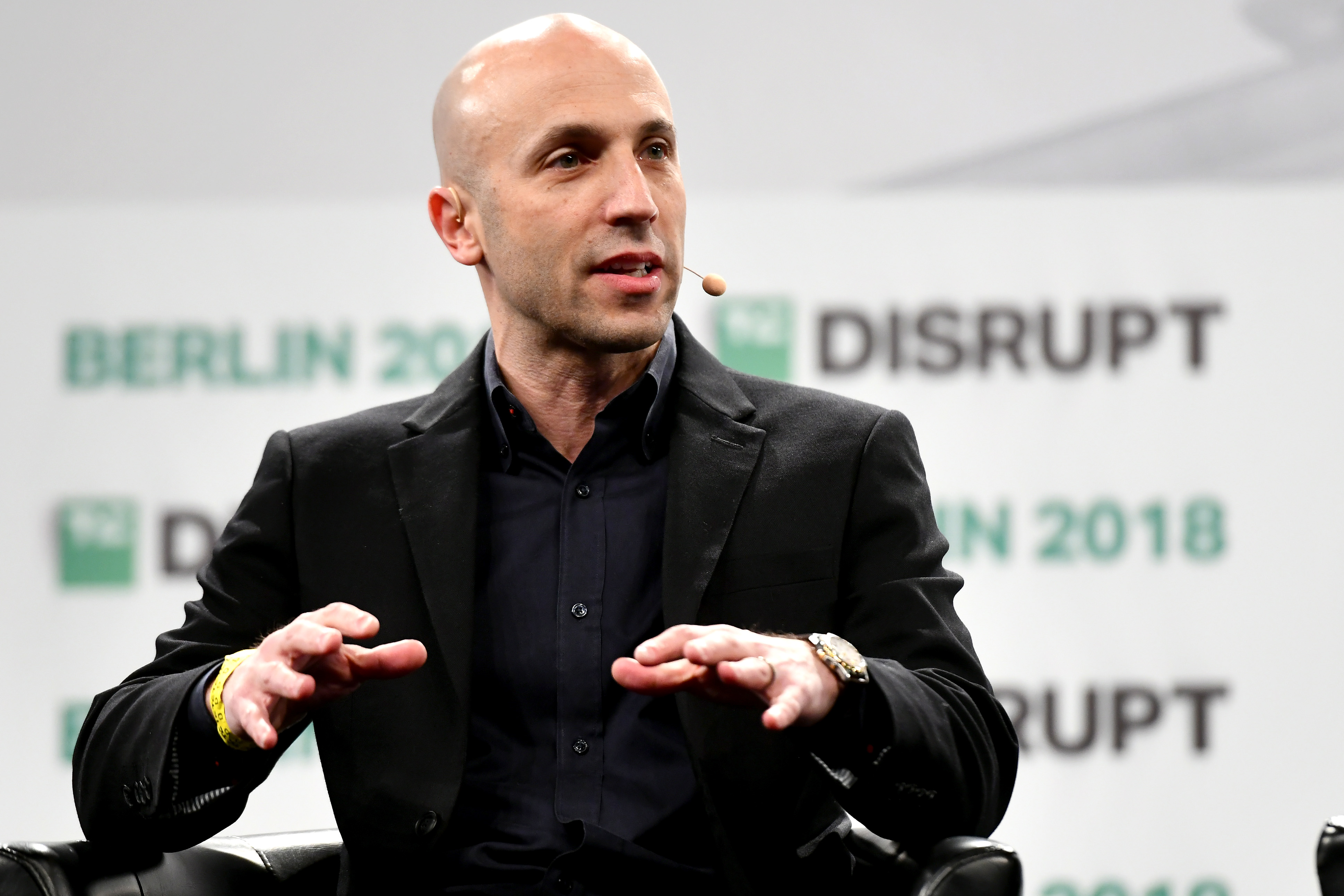
- Ramot in 2018
- Born: 1975 (age 50–51); Israel
- Education: Hebrew University of Jerusalem; Tel Aviv University; Stanford University
- Occupations: Entrepreneur; Engineer; Neuroscientist
- Organization(s): Via; D. E. Shaw Research; Israeli Air Force
- Known for: Co-founder of Via
- Awards: Dan David Prize

Daniel Ramot (Hebrew: דניאל רמות) is Israeli-born American entrepreneur, and scientist. He is the co-founder and CEO of the TransitTech company, Via.

== Early life and education ==
Ramot was born in 1975 in Israel, attended elementary school in Turkey, and high school at the United World College of SE Asia in Singapore. Ramot is a graduate of the Israel Defense Force's Talpiot program, this is also where he met Oren Shoval, who would later become his co-founding partner. As part of that program, he received a Bachelor of Science in Physics and Mathematics at Hebrew University of Jerusalem.

From 1996 to 2002, Ramot served in the Israeli Air Force where he developed avionic systems for F-15s and F-16s. During this time, he also completed a Master of Science in electrical engineering from Tel Aviv University. In 2002, Ramot moved to the US to pursue a graduate degree in neuroscience.

He received a PhD in neuroscience from Stanford University School of Medicine in 2007. Ramot is quoted as saying that "understanding the human brain nervous system is a critical aspect that drives the economy". During his doctoral research, Ramot was awarded several scholarships, including the Dan David Prize scholarship in 2004 and the Albion Walter Hewlett Stanford Graduate Fellowship. Ramot's PhD dissertation focused on the molecular and cellular basis of thermosensation and the behavioral mechanisms of thermoregulation. From 2008 until 2012, Ramot was a Director at D.E. Shaw Research, where he was involved in building supercomputers designed to discover new pharmaceutical drugs.

=== Business ===
In 2012, Ramot teamed up with fellow Talpiot alumnus Oren Shoval, to assist with building the algorithm and technology and eventually to co-found Via in New York City. Via is a global transportation technology company that builds software for public and private mobility systems, last-mile deliveries, and transportation planning services. It operates in more than 35 countries, where its technology powers microtransit, paratransit, school bus, transit planning, and autonomous vehicle networks. As of March 2021, Via is valued at US$2.8 billion.

== Selected publications ==
- Ramot, D., MacInnis, B. & Goodman, MB. Bidirectional temperature-sensing by a single thermosensory neuron in C. elegans. Nat Neurosci 11, 908–915 (2008). https://doi.org/10.1038/nn.2157
- Ramot D, MacInnis BL, Lee HC, Goodman MB. Thermotaxis is a robust mechanism for thermoregulation in Caenorhabditis elegans nematodes. The Journal of Neuroscience : the Official Journal of the Society For Neuroscience. 28: 12546–57. PMID 19020047 doi:10.1523/JNEUROSCI.2857-08.2008
- Chalasani SH, Chronis N, Tsunozaki M, Gray JM, Ramot D, Goodman MB, Bargmann CI. Dissecting a circuit for olfactory behaviour in Caenorhabditis elegans (Nature (2007) 450, (63–70)) Nature. 451: 102. doi:10.1038/Nature06540
- David E. Shaw, J.P. Grossman, Joseph A. Bank, Brannon Batson, J. Adam Butts, Jack C. Chao, Martin M. Deneroff, Ron O. Dror, Amos Even, Christopher H. Fenton, Anthony Forte, Joseph Gagliardo, Gennette Gill, Brian Greskamp, C. Richard Ho, Douglas J. Ierardi, Lev Iserovich, Jeffrey S. Kuskin, Richard H. Larson, Timothy Layman, Li-Siang Lee, Adam K. Lerer, Chester Li, Daniel Killebrew, Kenneth M. Mackenzie, Shark Yeuk-Hai Mok, Mark A. Moraes, Rolf Mueller, Lawrence J. Nociolo, Jon L. Peticolas, Terry Quan, Daniel Ramot, John K. Salmon, Daniele P. Scarpazza, U. Ben Schafer, Naseer Siddique, Christopher W. Snyder, Jochen Spengler, Ping Tak Peter Tang, Michael Theobald, Horia Toma, Brian Towles, Benjamin Vitale, Stanley C. Wang, and Cliff Young, "Anton 2: Raising the Bar for Performance and Programmability in a Special-Purpose Molecular Dynamics Supercomputer," Proceedings of the International Conference for High Performance Computing, Networking, Storage and Analysis (SC14), Piscataway, NJ: IEEE, 2014, pp. 41–53.
- Butts JA, Batson B, Chao JC, Deneroff MM, Dror RO, Fenton CH, Forte A, Gagliardo J, Gill G, Greskamp B, Grossman JP, Ho CR, Kuskin JS, Larson RH, Layman T, ... ... Ramot D, et al. The ANTON 2 chip a second-generation ASIC for molecular dynamics 2014 Ieee Hot Chips 26 Symposium, Hcs 2014. doi:10.1109/HOTCHIPS.2014.7478807
- Ramot D, Milo R, Friedman M, Kandel A. On fuzzy correlations. Ieee Transactions On Systems, Man, and Cybernetics. Part B, Cybernetics : a Publication of the Ieee Systems, Man, and Cybernetics Society. 31: 381–90. PMID 18244801 doi:10.1109/3477.931523
- Ramot D, Milo R, Friedman M, Kandel A. Complex fuzzy sets Ieee Transactions On Fuzzy Systems. 10: 171–186. doi:10.1109/91.995119
