= Yoav Dothan =

Israeli chess player (born 1955)

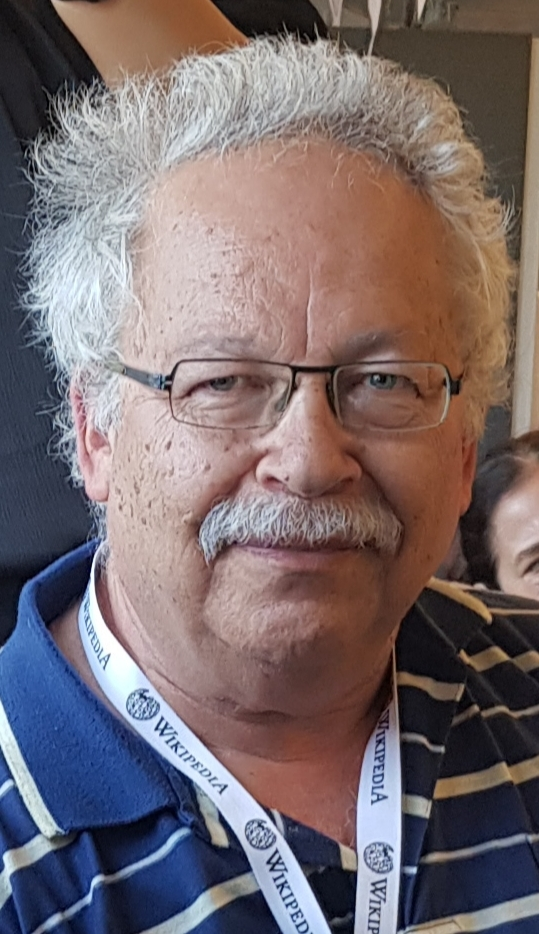
Yoav Dothan

Yoav Dothan (Hebrew: יואב דותן; born 1955) is an Israeli chess player who holds the chess title of International Correspondence Chess Grandmaster. He was the Israeli champion of correspondence chess for the 1997 championship and the winner of the Finland Jubilee 40. He lives in Ramat Hasharon. At the ICCF congress in Leeds 2009, Dothan received the Bertl von Massow award in silver and in 2024 received the Bertl von Massow award in gold.

Dothan's ICCF rating is 2632 (updated January 2011) and he holds the first place in Israel and 23rd in the world.

Born in Jerusalem to Felix Dothan. Dothan lives in Ramat Hasharon, is married to Ilana and father of Shai Dothan who is a Professor of International Law, and David and Deganit both physicians.

== ICCF tournaments ==
Major tournaments in which Dothan has played
Start date	Name of the tournament	Site	Board for a team event	Place in individual event	Number of games	Category	GM norm	Actual result
1 June 1997	The Israeli championship nr. 37	-	-	1	6	-	-	5.5
1 August 2000	Jänisch Memorial (RUS)		-	4	14	9	10	10
2003	VI EU MSM - Preliminaries, section 3 - Board 2		2	-	10	9	7.5	7.5
25 April 2003	10 Years Russian CCA, group B		-	1	14	11	9	10
30 July 2004	Finjub - 40/Post (FIN)		-	1	15	10	10	11
16 October 2004	European TC VI, Final board 2		2	-	12	13	7	8.5
1 February 2005	Altshuler Memorial		-	1	14	10	9.5	11
20 December 2005	7th European Team Championship - Semifinal 1 board 1		1	-	10	8	7.5	7.5
1 February 2007	Murakhvery Memorial		-	1	14	9	10	10
10 September 2007	AEAC 5 Years - Alhambra		-	3-5	14	12	8	8
30 September 2007	Luciano Cámara memorial "A"		-	1	12	13	7	8.5
1 May 2008	Ragozin Memorial		-	2	14	12	8.5	9.5
21 February 2009	8th European Team Championship - Semifinal 3 board 1		1	-	9	11	6	6.5
9 July 2016	800 Aniversario Orden de Predicadores - A		-	2-5	16	14	8.5	8.5

== ICCF matches ==
Dothan represented Israel in international matches:

- In 1995, playing on the 10th board against Rick Melton, draw 1–1 in the Israel-U.S.A match
- In 1995, playing on the 5th board against GM David Beaumont Dothan won 2–0 in the Israel-Argentine/CAPA match
- In 1996, playing on the 7th board against Robert Trevis Dothan won 2–0 in the Israel-New Zealand match
- In 1996, playing on the 12th board against Ian Sneddon Dothan won 1.5-0.5 in the Israel-Scotland match
- In 1996, playing on the 2nd board against Hirashima Takateru Dothan won 2–0 in the Israel-Japan match
- In 1998, playing on the 3rd board against Jaroslav Postolka Dothan won 2–0 in the Israel-Czech Republic match
- In 1998, playing on the 2nd board against Walt de Cort Dothan won 2–0 in the Israel-England (NCCC) match
- In 2000, playing on the 1st board against SIM Heikki Arppi Dothan won 2–0 in the Israel-Finland match
- In 2004, playing on the 7th board against GM Vasily Borisovich Malinin Dothan won 2–0 in the Russia - Rest of the World match
- In 2008, playing on the 1st board against GM Arne Bjørn Jørgensen draw 1–1 in the Denmark - Israel match
- In 2008, playing on the 1st board against GM Conny Persson Dothan won 1.5-0.5 in the Sweden - Rest of the World match

== Mixed Doubles chess match ==
Roland Stratmann was asked by the Museum of Modern Art Liechtenstein to develop a contribution to the exhibition “Faites vos jeux ! Kunst und Spiel seit DADA”. The issue for the exhibition was to show the conjunction between Art and Game during the last hundred years. And the chess game was one of the leitmotifs of the exhibition. As Marcel Duchamp – who was an important artist and chess player as well – once said: “Not all artists are chess players, but all chess players are artists”. Stratmann kept this sentence in the back of his mind when he started to develop an idea for the exhibition. The result of his thoughts was a 7 by 7 meter big, from the museum ceiling upside down hanging chessboard – attached with 32 banners printed with chess characters. During the exhibition chess masters from four countries played a chess game via the Internet. The flags were then reassigned according to the result of the moves. Thus the space changes every day as well. Two teams were competing in the alternating correspondence chess game: Team A consisted of a player from Cuba and one from the United States of America; Team B consisted of a player from Israel and one from Morocco and in the fourth game a player from Ghana.

Meanwhile “Mixed Doubles” has also been shown and played at the Museum of Modern Art Siegen, the Cobra Museum of Modern Art in Amsterdam and in the Museum Zwickau. Stratmann said: "I am very happy that this game for peace and friendship is still going on successfully. But all this would not have happened without the capital support from the ICCF. For this purpose I would like to thank Med Samraoui and Fritz Baumbach who helped me from the very first. Great thanks to Corky Schakel, Pablo Salcedo Mederos, Yoav Dothan, Khalid Chorfi and Dr. Ole Jacobsen who created such exciting chess games. And I am grateful to all members of the ICCF and the Museums who have been involved in this project during the last two years."

The games:

- Zwickau Match, iccf-webchess.com
- Liechtenstein Museum Match, iccf-webchess.com
- Siegen Museum Match, iccf-webchess.com
- Cobra Museum of Modern Art in Amsterdam Museum Match, iccf-webchess.com
- Corky Schakel, An article on one of the games

== Articles written by Dothan ==
- Articles in Chessville, chessville.com
- Articles about Correspondence Chess, iccf-europa.com
