= Udi Mokady =

Israeli businessman

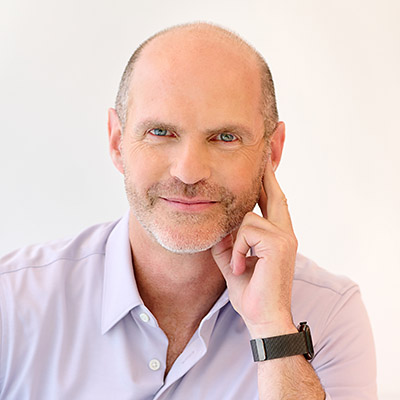
- Born: 1968; Zambia, Africa
- Occupations: Founder and Executive Chairman of CyberArk

Udi Mokady (Hebrew: אודי מוקדי) is an Israeli-American entrepreneur and cybersecurity expert who helped create an industry for privileged access management. He founded cybersecurity company CyberArk and served as its CEO from 2005 to 2023.

== Early life and education ==
Udi Mokady was born 1968 in Zambia, Africa. He was raised largely in Jerusalem, but also lived in Central America, Africa, and the United States. His father was a diplomat for the Ministry of Foreign Affairs. He worked in intelligence for the Israeli military in Unit 8200, which focused on military intelligence, hacking, and encryption. This is where he first developed an interest in computers. Afterwards, Mokady earned a J.D. in law from Hebrew University of Jerusalem in 1994, then an M.B.A. from Boston University in 2003.

== Career ==
Udi Mokady began his career as a lawyer. He served as Vice President and General Counsel of Tadiran Spectralink, an Israeli communications technology company. Mokady's childhood friend Alon Cohen suggested they start a cybersecurity business together. Then, in April 1999, the two co-founded CyberArk.

Initially, Mokady served as COO with Cohen as CEO. They founded the company in Israel, then Mokady opened a U.S. headquarters in Boston, Massachusetts the following year, while leaving research and development in Israel. Mokady experimented with marketing different "vaults" that were specialized for different corporate departments, before settling on the password vault as CyberArk's first product. CyberArk grew over time, in particular around 2003 and after the Edward Snowden leaks.

Mokady served as CEO of CyberArk from 2005 to 2023. He grew the company substantially in revenues and into other areas of cybersecurity. He also expanded the company internationally by establishing reseller programs first in Europe, then in Asia. Mokady helped establish privileged access management (PAM) as an industry. In 2011, Mokady brokered a deal with Goldman Sachs to buyout early investors, including co-founder Alon Cohen. Goldman Sachs bought a 50 percent interest in the company. CyberArk went public on NASDAQ in September 2014 and acquired several small IT security companies. In February 2023, Mokady resigned as CEO of CyberArk and was appointed to the Executive Chairman of the Board position. Former COO Matt Cohen became the new CEO.

== Personal life ==
Udi Mokady is married with three children. He lives in Boston, Massachusetts.
