= Shai Dothan =

Lawyer and legal academic

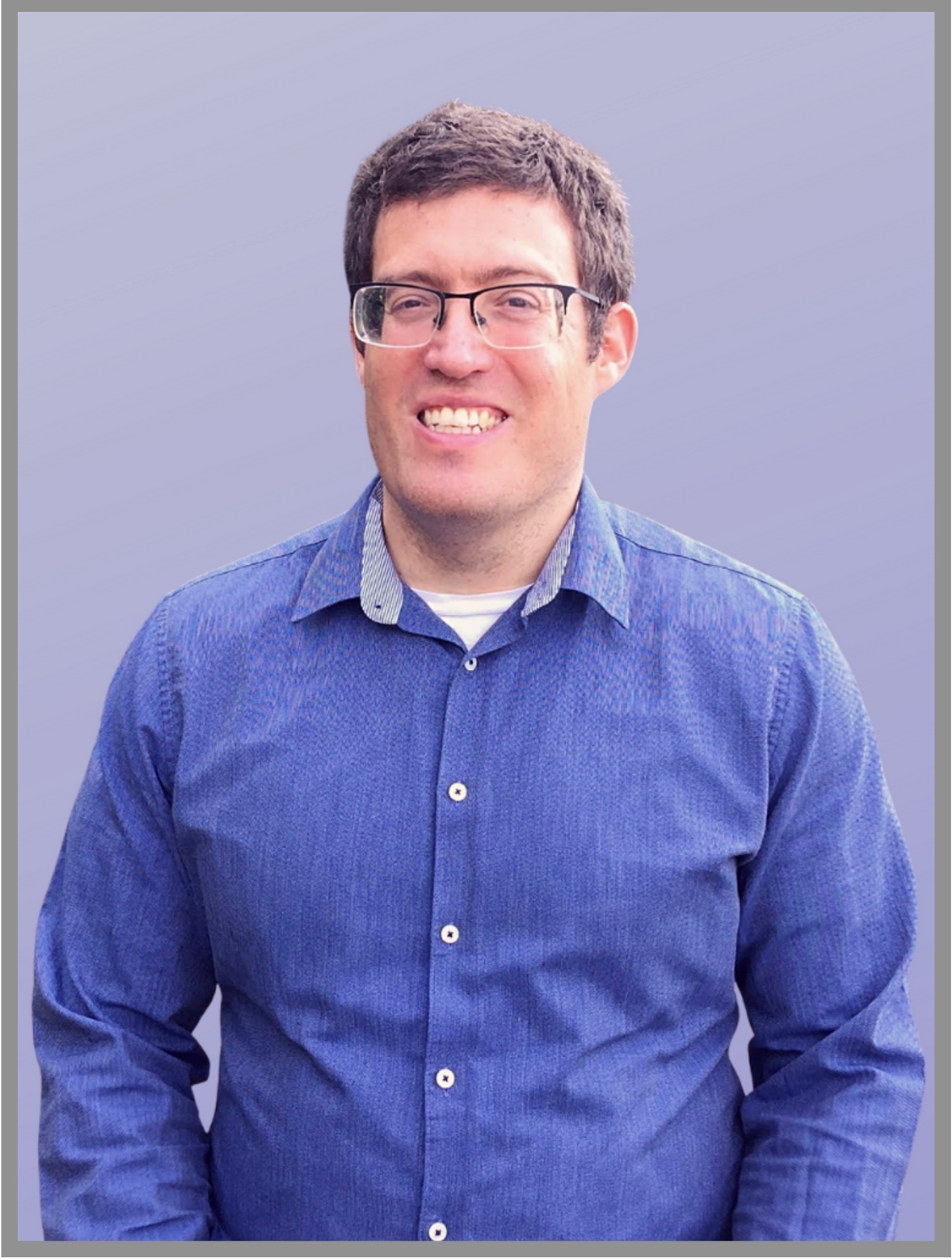
Shai Dothan, 2020

Shai Dothan (Hebrew: שי דותן; born 1981) is a lawyer and legal academic. He is currently Associate Professor of International and Public Law at the University of Copenhagen Faculty of Law affiliated with iCourts—Centre of Excellence for International Courts (2014–present). He lives close to Copenhagen with his wife and two children.

== Early life and education ==
Dothan was born in Israel in 1981 to Ilana and Yoav Dothan.

Between 1995 and 1997 he participated in a two-year gymnasium program for the most talented youths in the region. When he turned 16, he started his LL.B. at Tel Aviv University. In 2001, he graduated magna cum laude. He continued his studies at the same institute and in 2003 he received his LLM with a thesis in Administrative Law (summa cum laude). He earned his PhD in 2011 from Tel Aviv University.

Professor Eyal Benvenisti supervised his PhD dissertation, which was titled "Reputation and Judicial Strategy– Tactics of National and International Courts". Dothan continued to research the topic. This work formed the basis of his first book, published with Cambridge University Press in 2015.

== Academic career ==
Dothan was a Fox Fellow at Yale University. He got the Rothschild Fellowship and went as a Post-Doctoral Fellow to the University of Chicago Law School. Later he was also a Post-Doctoral Fellow at the Hebrew University of Jerusalem Faculty of Law and Tel Aviv University Faculty of Law as well as a Fellow at the Max Planck Institute for Comparative Public Law and International Law.

== Publications ==
=== Books ===
- How to Master English as a Multilingual: A Guide for Students, Lawyers, and Professionals, forthcoming Edward Elgar Publishing (2023).
- International Judicial Review When Should International Courts Intervene? Cambridge University Press (2020).
- Reputation and Judicial Tactics A Theory of National and International Courts, Cambridge University Press (2015) (paperback 2016).

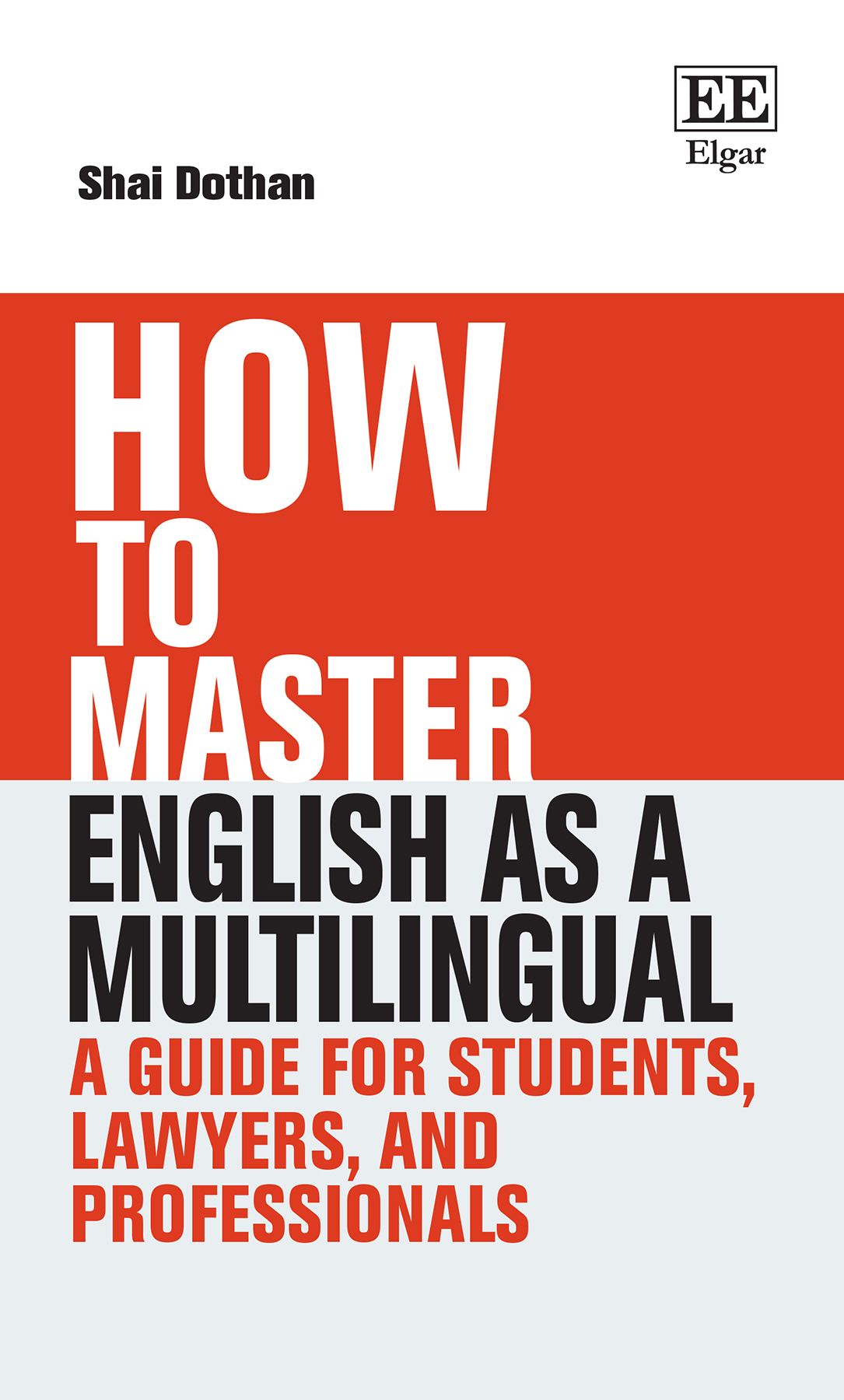
How to Master English as a Multilingual

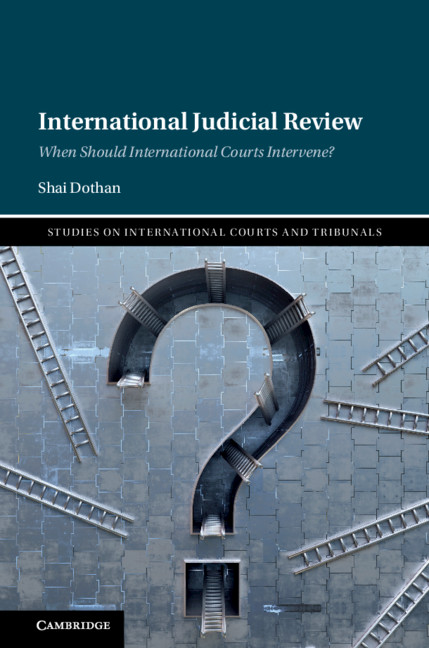
International Judicial Review

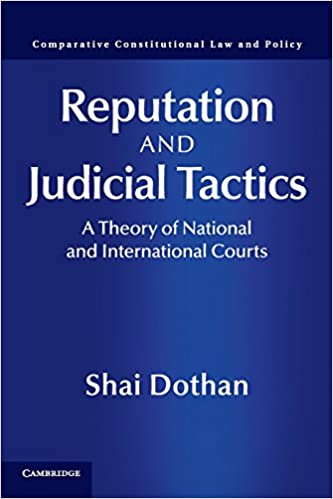
Reputation and Judicial Tactics

=== Selected articles ===
- Democracy, Populism, and Concentrated Interests, forthcoming 56 Loy. L. A. L. Rev. (2023).
- Violating International Law is Contagious, 23 Chi. J. Int'l. L. 79 (2022).
- As If: Why Legal Scholarship Needs Assumptions, 51 Seton Hall L. Rev. 645 (2021).
- Reputation and Strategy in the Israeli Supreme Court on the Brink of the 21st Century, forthcoming 23 IDC Law Review (2020) (Hebrew).
- The Three Traditional Approaches to Treaty Interpretation: A Current Application to the European Court of Human Rights, 42 Fordham Int'l L. J. 765 (2019).
- The Motivations of Individual Judges and How They Act as a Group, 19 German Law Journal 2165 (2018).
- When Immediate Responses Fail, 51 Vand. J. Transnat'l L. 1075 (2018).
- Judicial Deference Allows European Consensus to Emerge, 18 Chi. J. Int'l. L. 392 (2018).
- A Virtual Wall of Shame: The New Way of Imposing Reputational Sanctions on Defiant States, 27 Duke J. Comp. & Int'l. L. 141 (2017).
- Judicial Tactics in the European Court of Human Rights, 12 Chi. J. Int'l. L. 115 (2011). (Ukrainian translation in European L. J. 1-2/2013, 58)

=== Book chapters ===
- Kvantitative Metoder i Juridisk Forskning in RET PÅ TVÆRS: METODISKE VINKLER PÅ JURAEN, Jurist- og Økonomforbundets Forlag, forthcoming (2020) (Danish).
- Ex Aequo Et Bono: The Uses of the Road Never Taken, in RESEARCH HANDBOOK ON THE INTERNATIONAL COURT OF JUSTICE (Achilles Skordas (ed.), Elgar Publishing, forthcoming (2020).
- Social Networks and the Enforcement of International Law, in EDWARD ELGAR RESEARCH HANDBOOK ON THE SOCIOLOGY OF INTERNATIONAL LAW 333 (Moshe Hirsch & Andrew Lang eds., 2018).
- Comparative Views on the Right to Vote in International Law: The Case of Prisoners’ Disenfranchisement, in COMPARATIVE INTERNATIONAL LAW 379 (Anthea Roberts et al. eds., Oxford University Press, 2018).
- Three Interpretive Constraints on the European Court of Human Rights, in THE RULE OF LAW AT THE NATIONAL AND INTERNATIONAL LEVELS: CONTESTATIONS AND DEFERENCE 227 (Machiko Kanetake & André Nollkaemper eds., Hart Publishing, 2016).
