= Yossi Sariel =

Israel Defense Forces officer (born 1978)

- יוסי שריאל
- Born: 1978 (age 47–48); Haifa, Israel
- Military career
- Allegiance: Israel
- Branch: Israel Defense Forces
- Service years: 1997–present
- Rank: Brigadier General
- Commands: Unit 8200
- Awards: Israel Security Award

Yossi Sariel (Hebrew: יוסי שריאל; born in 1978) is an Israel Defense Forces officer. He was the commander of Unit 8200 in 2018.

== Military career ==
He was born in 1978 and grew up in Haifa. He enlisted in the IDF Intelligence Division in 1997 and served as an intelligence and cyber officer in Unit 8200. Then as an intelligence officer in Division 91, head of the northern arena in the research division, an intelligence officer of the Central Command, and the head of the operational division at Aman.

On 28 February 2021, he was appointed commander of Unit 8200 in place of Brigadier General Asaf Khochan who retired. He also served in this position during the Gaza war until his resignation on 12 September 2024.

On 23 November 2025, IDF chief of staff Eyal Zamir dismissed Sariel from reservist duty due to his role in Israel's failures on 7 October.

== Post-military career ==
In February 2026, Sariel joined the board of Israeli AI company Decart AI, and founded a new startup called Alma Labs, focused on making AI education accessible to schools and educational institutions.

== Book authorship and identification ==
In 2021, the Success Association published the diary of the director general of the Ministry of Housing, in which he wrote that he met with "Commander of 8200 - Yossi Sariel".

In May 2021, Sariel published the electronic book The Human-Machine Team under the pen name, Brigadier General YS. In the book, he presented his point of view on artificial intelligence and its ability to change the relationship between personnel and machines in the army.

Sariel's identity was confidential, but on 5 April 2024 The Guardian revealed that for years Sariel had public accounts on social networks in which he disclosed his name and rank, as well as an account on the Hebrew Wikipedia under his full name.
