= Urim SIGINT Base =

Israeli intelligence-gathering installation

- Near Urim, Israel

Site information
- Type: Intelligence-gathering installation
- Owner: Ministry of Defense (Israel)
- Operator: Unit 8200
- Controlled by: Israel Defense Forces

Location
- Coordinates: 31.311262°N 34.542689°E

Site history
- Built: "Decades" before 2010

Urim SIGINT Base is an Israeli intelligence-gathering installation, supposedly part of the Unit 8200, the signal intelligence unit of the Intelligence Corps of the Israel Defense Forces. It is located in the Negev desert approximately 30 km from Beersheba, a couple of kilometres north of the kibbutz of Urim. Until articles were published about the base in 2010, it was not known to the outside world.

Equivalents of Unit 8200 are the Government Communications Headquarters (GCHQ) of Britain and the National Security Agency (NSA) of the United States. Each of these signals interception spy agencies is far bigger in size than the traditional intelligence agencies of their respective countries.

== History ==
Created decades ago to monitor Intelsat satellites that relay international telephone calls, Urim was expanded to cover maritime communications (Inmarsat), and continued being expanded to intercept more communications satellites. Duncan Campbell, an intelligence specialist speculated that Urim is "akin to the UK-USA pact's Echelon satellite interception ground stations." The Echelon system was established by the United States, Britain, Canada, Australia and New Zealand as a global network of signal interception stations.

== Function ==
The base has a row of satellite dishes that are allegedly able to intercept phone calls, emails, and other communications from anywhere in the Middle East, Europe, Africa, and Asia, as well as antennas that can monitor shipping. There are also numerous barracks and operations buildings lined along the road that leads to the base, which is protected by high security gates, fences, and guard dogs.

It is said that computers at Urim detect words and phone numbers of interest from intercepted phone calls, e-mails, etc. which are then transferred to Unit 8200's headquarters at Herzliya. At the HQ, the information is translated and submitted as necessary to IDF headquarters or to Israel's intelligence agencies, such as the Mossad.
