= Felix Dothan =

Professor at the Hebrew University of Jerusalem

Felix Dothan (Deutsch) (Hebrew: פליקס דותן; 1924-2005) was a full professor of physics at the Hebrew University of Jerusalem. He initiated the Talpiot program together with Professor Shaul Yatziv.

Dothan received his B.A. from the Technion and his PhD from the Hebrew University. His research centered on plasma and the technology of high voltage electricity. He won the award of the Israeli Chief of Staff for a lifetime contribution to technology in 2001, especially for founding the Talpiot program.

== Biography ==
=== Childhood ===
Felix Dothan was born in 1924 in Zagreb, Croatia. He was the first-born son to Sandor Deutsch, a merchant of building materials, and Lilli, the daughter of Marcus Steiner. He was born in a bilingual environment that used both Serbo-Croatian and German.

Until the summer of 1942, the family was protected from the prosecution of Jews by their business partners that had connections with the heads of government. In August 1942, all the protections were abolished and the remaining Jews of Zagreb, including the family, were arrested. Within a few days, the Croatian Nazis, the Ustaše, arranged a transport to Auschwitz. Fortunately, Deutsch was saved by a Croat and instead of going on the train he was put in three weeks home arrest and was later released. Until the liberation of Croatia in May 1945, Jews were sometimes hunted down, but Deutsch managed to survive by hiding among non-Jews.

=== Education ===
After the war, four years in which he was not permitted to study, Deutsch was allowed by the Yugoslavian ministry of education to finish high-school and the matriculation exams, which he passed summa cum laude. The same year he started to study electrical engineering at the University of Zagreb, where he studied for three years. In the fourth year, December 1948, he immigrated to Israel.

In Israel, he worked for half a year in construction and as a fisherman. In Summer 1949, when the studies at the Technion were resumed after the end of the War of Independence, Deutsch was admitted to the third year of studies in the electricity faculty. He finished his studies in the Technion at the beginning of 1951 after facing the challenge of not knowing the Hebrew language and became an engineer.

=== Scientific work ===
In February 1951 he started to work as a designer of scientific machinery in Hemed (later Rafael) in Jerusalem. Among other things, he designed an experimental device for the production of Ether, a centrifuge for the separation of heavy water and vacuum pumps. In July 1954 the Hemed institute in Jerusalem was closed and Dothan started to work at the Hebrew University. In July 1951, he married Olga Balog and the couple had two children, Yoav who is an International chess Grand Master and was also the Israeli champion in Correspondence Chess, and Ruth, a family doctor.

In Spring 1957, Deutsch left with his family to Switzerland where he worked for two and a half years as a research engineer in the high voltage laboratory. Among other things, he studied electro-negative gases, built an innovative measuring device (Deutsch bridge) and calculated using advanced mathematical methods the electric field of complicated constructions.

In the beginning of 1960, he came back to the Hebrew University. This time, to the new laboratory for physics of electrically ionized gases (plasma) as an expert for high voltage. Then he started his Ph.D. studies, which he finished in 1965. During his studies, he registered several patents.

After finishing his PhD, he was accepted as a visiting scientist at the European Organization for Nuclear Research (CERN) in Geneva, where he stayed for two years. His research dealt primarily with the calculation of the proper magnetic fields for super-conductor magnets. He also designed, built, and explored a switch that is turned on in a nanosecond using a laser pulse.

In 1968 he was appointed as a senior lecturer at the Racah Institute of Physics. In 1980 he was appointed a full professor. In 1968, he changed his family name from Deutsch to Dothan.

Throughout the years 1968 to 1973, he studied various lasers together with professor Shaul Yatziv and professor Pinchas Avivi and built a laser inside a metal pipe instead of a glass tube, which allowed for the creation of more durable lasers. He also studied the dynamics of excitation in molecules of CO_{2}. In 1973–1974 he was a visiting professor at the University of California, Irvine where he built and studied a plasma gun and measures for the rapid circulation of the plasma created in the cannon.

=== Founding the Talpiot program ===
During his stay in California, the Yom Kippur War broke. Dothan feared for the fate of Israel and thought about a way to help the country sustain similar challenges in the future. He had an idea: to create a unit of the most talented soldiers drafted in every term. These youngsters will first study intensively to reach the cutting edge of current science and technology and later will invent, design, and build advanced weapons.

When he got back to Israel he wrote, together with his colleague Professor Shaul Yatziv a proposal for the creation of an institute for developing new weapons that listed the core of the idea. In Summer 1974, he submitted the proposal to the minister of defense but the committee that was appointed to discuss the issue did not reach a decision.

In 1975, a group of lecturers at the Hebrew University was organized following the initiative of professor Shaul Patay to help the IDF by various inventions and improving procedures. The group suggested and built several constructions. Dothan contributed a laser gun that was used for training of gunmen in tanks.

In 1978, he met with professor Patay the Chief of Staff Rafael Eitan. Dothan presented his proposal to create a unit of talented youth. Eitan ordered to initiate the program which he called the Talpiot program. The first term was drafted in the Spring of 1979 and operated, as all later terms, as a military unit within the Hebrew University of Jerusalem. The cadets studied three years of extended studies of physics and mathematics and during the study breaks joined courses in various units of the IDF. Dothan served as a volunteer as the primary educator of Talpiot between 1979 and 1994. The graduates of the Talpiot program contributed much to the IDF and some of them won the Israel Defense Prize.

=== Later years ===
In the years 1974–1981, he worked especially on the dynamics of electric glow discharge. In the years 1981–1982, he was a visiting research fellow at Yale University. In 1986 and in 1991, he was a visiting researcher in CERN in Geneva. In 1992, he retired.

In 1986 he won the President decoration for an important contribution to the defense of Israel and in 2001 he won the Chief of Staff prize for a lifetime contribution in the field of technology.

In the last years of his life, he published four books designed to encourage within the educated public, especially young readers, a greater interest in science. On his last day, he gave an interview on the radio station Kol Israel about science and research. At the end of the interview, he expressed a clear warning about the danger to Israel posed by an Iranian armament with nuclear weapons. Minutes after the interview ended, he lost consciousness.

== Patents ==
- Phonocardioscope with a liquid crystal display
- Starter for inductively coupled plasma tube
