= Matzov =

Cybersecurity directorate of the Israel Defense Forces

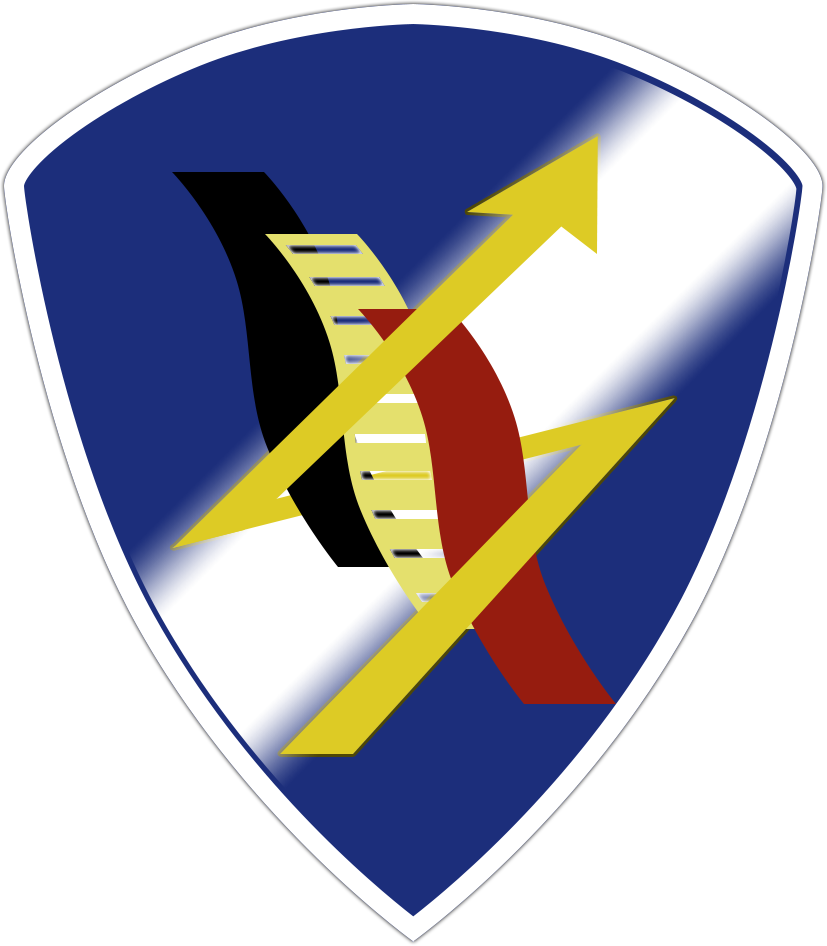
Matzov's unit insignia

Matzov (Hebrew: מצו״ב), Hebrew abbreviation for Center of Encryption and Information Security (Hebrew: מרכז צופן וביטחון Merkaz Tzophen UVitahon), is an information security unit under the C4I directorate of the Israel Defence Force.

The unit is exclusively responsible for all aspects of Information Security and Encryption in Israel, providing encryption solutions to security forces, including the IDF, Shin Bet, and Mossad, as well as state-owned enterprises, such as Bezeq, Mekorot, and the Israel Electric Corporation.

== Companies founded by alumni ==
Despite its relatively small size, Matzov alumni have gone on to found many successful tech companies, among them

- Taboola
- Trusteer
- SlickLogin
- CYE
- Checkmarx
- Ermetic
- CyberX
- Apiiro
- Salt Security
- Salvador Technologies

== Activities ==
Due to its secretive nature, little is publicly known about Matzov's activities. However, several of its operations were made public. Notably, the unit provided the encryption solution for the Iron Dome air defense system.

== Recruitment ==
Matzov recruits soldiers from a variety of elite military programs, including Talpiot, Gamma, and Psagot. In addition, high school students demonstrating extraordinary programming or mathematical abilities are actively sought after and recruited by the unit.
