= Indeni (company) =

Software development company

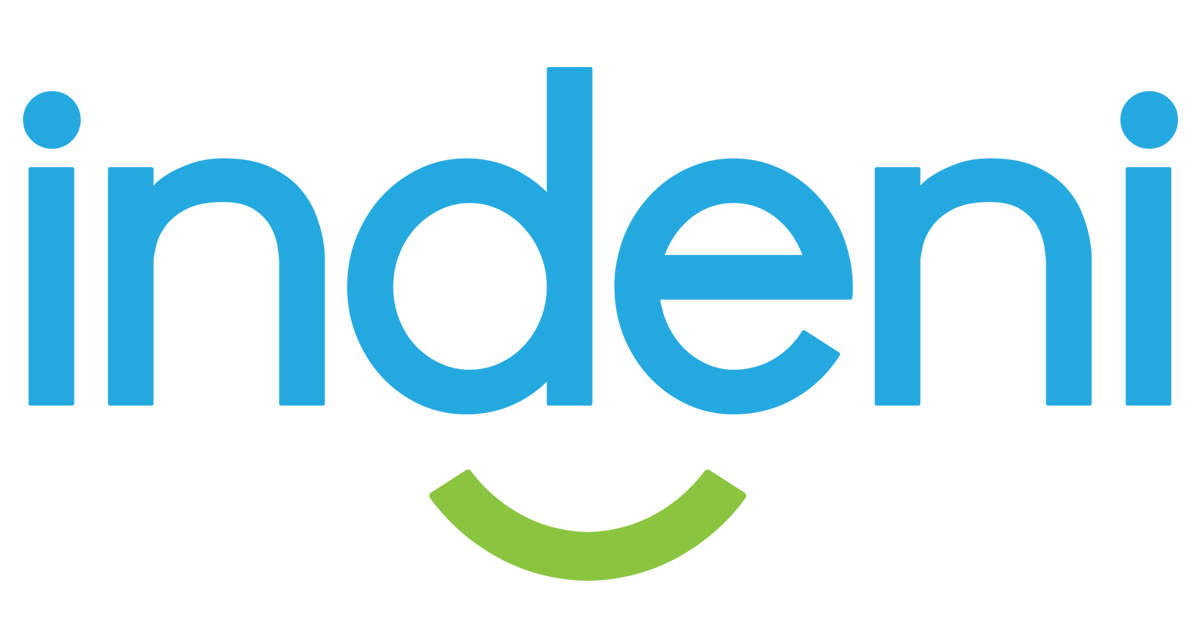
- Company type: Private
- Founded: 2009
- Headquarters: Canada
- Key people: Yoni Leitersdorf (Founder and CEO)
- Parent: BlueCat Networks
- Website: https://www.indeni.com

Indeni was a software development company which developed Network automation and cloud security software. They offered scripts to validate firewall, DNS/DHCP server and load balancer configurations and performance to help reduce and/or avoid network downtime. The company was backed by Sequoia Capital and others investors. It was acquired by BlueCat Networks in July of 2023.

== Overview ==
The company provides a way, using crowd-sourcing and an open development process, to collect data on device behavior in large amounts. Their technology supports many products including BlueCat Networks Integrity BDDS and BAMs, Check Point firewalls, F5 BIG-IP, Fortinet, Fireeye, Gigamon, Juniper, Palo Alto Networks, Radware and other devices. The software that they provide identifies issues that are not caught with SNMP monitoring.

== History ==
Indeni was founded in 2009 by Yoni Leitersdorf. It was created by a team of networking, cyber security experts and software technicians. They were supported by venture capital funds including Sequoia Capital.

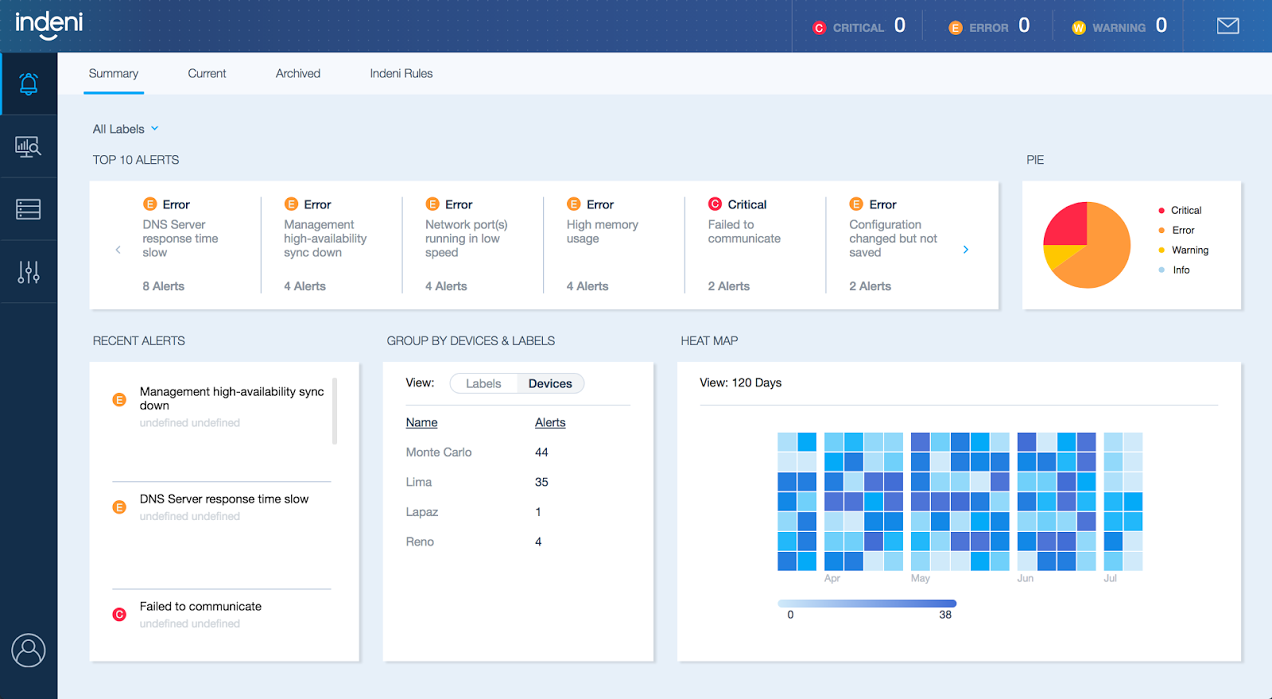
Indeni 6.0 Dashboard (User interface)
