= CyberArk =

Israeli software company

CyberArk Software Ltd.

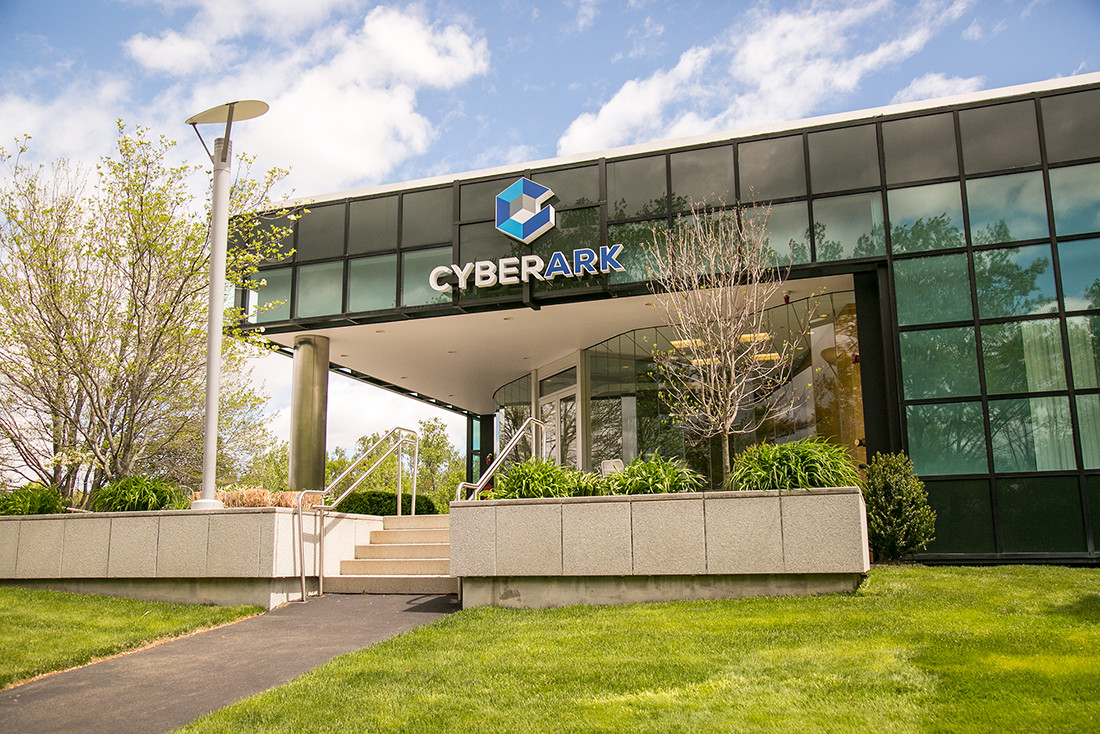
- CyberArk's U.S. headquarters in Newton, Massachusetts
- Type: Subsidiary
- Industry: Software
- Founded: 1999; 27 years ago
- Founders: Udi Mokady; Alon N. Cohen
- Headquarters: Petach-Tikva, Israel
- Key people: Udi Mokady (executive chairman); Matthew Cohen (CEO)
- Products: Privileged Account Security
- Revenue: ▲US$1.00 billion (2024)
- Operating income: ▲US$−73 million (2024)
- Net income: ▼US$−93 million (2024)
- Total assets: ▲US$3.34 billion (2024)
- Total equity: ▲US$2.37 billion (2024)
- Number of employees: 3,793 (2024)
- Parent: Palo Alto Networks (2026–present)
- Website: cyberark.com

CyberArk Software Ltd. is an Israeli information security company and a subsidiary of Palo Alto Networks offering identity management. The company's technology is utilized primarily in the financial services, energy, retail, healthcare, and government markets. CyberArk is headquartered in Petach-Tikva, with its United States headquarters located in Newton, MA. The company also has offices throughout the Americas, EMEA, Asia Pacific, and Japan.

== History ==
CyberArk was founded in 1999 in Israel by Udi Mokady and Alon N. Cohen.

In June 2014, CyberArk filed for an initial public offering (IPO) with the Securities and Exchange Commission, listing 2013 revenues of $66.2 million. CyberArk became a public company the same year, trading on the NASDAQ as CYBR.

In April 2022, it announced the expansion of its R&D center at the Gav-Yam Negev Tech Park in Beersheba, which it had opened in May 2021.

In February 2023, CyberArk announced that Udi Mokady, who had led the company as CEO since November 2005, would transition out of that role and become executive chair of the company's board, with Matt Cohen taking over the reins as CEO after previously serving as CRO and COO since joining the company in 2019; this transition became effective in April 2023.

On July 30, 2025, Palo Alto Networks announced it would buy CyberArk for $25 billion. The acquisition, which was closed in February 2026, was immediately followed by employee cuts that affect approximately over 10% of CyberArk both Israeli and global staff.

Acquisitions
Date	Company	Business	Country	Value	Ref
In August 2015	Cybertinel	Threat detection	Israel	$20 million	
October 2015	Viewfinity	Privilege management and application control	United States	$39.5 million	
In March 2016	Agata Solutions	Deep packet inspection	Israel	$3.1 million	
May 2017	Conjur Inc.	Cyber security	United States	$42 million	
March 2018	Vaultive	Cloud security	United States	Unknown	
May 2020	Idaptive	Zero trust security		$70 million	
March 2022	Aapi, Inc.	Identity and access management	United States	$17.7 million	
August 2022	C3M	Cloud security management	United States	$28.3 million	
October 2024	Venafi	Machine identity management		$1.54 billion	
February 2025	Zilla Security	Identity governance and administration		up to $175 million	

== Products ==
It sells subscriptions to what it has titled an Identity Security Platform. Among other products, as of 2015 it has a Privileged Account Security Platform to "privileged accounts and an organisation' sensitive information." The platform aims to stop hackers from entering computer systems via either a breach of administrator or key account holder privileges.
