= Via Transportation =

Real-time ridesharing company

Via Transportation, Inc.
- Type: Public
- Traded as: NYSE: VIA (Class A)
- Industry: Transport; Software; Transportation engineering Paratransit; Transportation planning
- Founded: 2012; 14 years ago
- Founders: Daniel Ramot; Oren Shoval
- Headquarters: New York City, U.S.
- Key people: Daniel Ramot (CEO); Charles Rivkin (Director)
- Revenue: ▲US$434 million (2025)
- Net income: ▼ −US$96.4 million (2025)
- Number of employees: 950
- Website: ridewithvia.com

Via Transportation, Inc. (operating as Via) is an American technology company that develops transit management software as a service (SaaS) and provides operational support for cities, transit agencies, schools and universities, healthcare providers, and corporations around the world. Founded in 2012, the company's software supports fully managed transit services, including planning, scheduling, daily operations, driver and fleet management, rider tools, consulting, and data analytics.

Founded in 2012, Via is headquartered in New York City with additional offices globally. As of 2025, Via served more than 800 global partners such as King County Metro in Seattle, Transport for London, Transport for New South Wales in Australia, and Berliner Verkehrsbetriebe in Germany.

== History ==
=== Founding and early years ===
Daniel Ramot and Oren Shoval co-founded Via in 2012. The company began as a ridesharing service on New York's Upper East Side before expanding citywide. Via used dynamic routing to group riders more efficiently, matching each rider with passengers heading in the same direction, and directing riders to virtual bus stops to meet their ride. Eventually the consumer business expanded to Washington D.C., Chicago, London, and Amsterdam.

=== Shift to public transit software ===
In 2017, the company began offering its software and operational support to municipalities and transit agencies. Partners could buy Via’s software to use as their own white labeled transportation service, or they could have Via handle operations as well, including vehicle fleets, drivers, and on-the-ground management and support staff.

In April 2019, Via worked with King County Metro and Sound Transit to provide last mile transportation to five Sound Transit Link light rail stations in Seattle. In 2023, Via took over operations and software for all of the agency’s on-demand transit services.

In May 2020, Via and Transport for Wales launched fflecsi, a demand-responsive service operating across urban, rural, an suburban areas in Wales.

In October 2020, Via acquired Fleetonomy, an Israeli startup and logistics company. That same year, Via also grew through organic product development by providing software for operating paratransit, and later for fixed-route bus scheduling.

=== Growth and public listing ===
After its expansion into a broader transit-tech company, Via continued to grow through acquisitions. In 2021, through its Remix acquisition, Via expanded into city mapping and transportation planning.

In 2023, Via acquired Citymapper, a journey-planning app with more than 50 million users in more than 400 cities. Via and Citymapper have worked with municipal governments and transit agencies to adapt the app to fit local needs, with city branding, disruption messaging, and in the case of the 2024 Paris Olympics, specialized routing for event management.

In August 2025, Via introduced Via Intelligence, its vertical AI platform, which includes real-time dynamic rerouting, predictive runtimes, and ridership modeling. It is used by cities to pre-test changes to physical bus routes.

Via transitioned to a public company in September 2025, listing on the New York Stock Exchange under the symbol VIA with an initial public offering of $493 million. The company was valued at $3.65 billion. At the end of 2025, the company had 832 customers in more than 30 countries.

In December 2025, Via acquired Downtowner, a transportation technology company that provides demand-responsive transit software for seasonal and geographically complex communities.

== Transportation services ==
=== Demand-responsive transit (DRT) ===
Demand-responsive transit is a form of shared public transport for groups traveling where vehicles alter their routes each journey based on particular transport demand, without using a fixed route or timetabled journeys.

=== Microtransit ===
Microtransit is tech-enabled shared transportation where routing algorithms use real-time, on-the-ground information to group passengers into shared rides. Routes are dynamic; “schedules” shift based on rider demand; and vehicles range in size from vans to shuttles, or buses, depending on what’s needed for the system.

=== Paratransit ===
Paratransit is accessible, door-to-door transportation for people with disabilities, typically delivered by vans or minibuses. In the United States, the ADA mandates that paratransit is offered within ¾ miles of any fixed-route bus line or train station. Via’s paratransit software can improve paratransit for both riders and operators by increasing on-time performance, reducing reliance on manual scheduling, and lowering overall cost-per-trip.

=== Transit consulting ===
Via has an in-house consulting practice, Via Strategies, that specializes in transit planning for tech-enabled and multimodal transit networks. Via Strategies works with city governments, transit agencies, state departments of transportation, and other transit clients on bus network redesigns, feasibility studies, and microtransit planning.

=== Corporate, health, and student transportation ===
Using microtransit technology, Via operates student and employee shuttles at universities and on corporate campuses around the world. Clients include Harvard University, Northwestern University, LinkedIn, Google, and BASF.

Via created a fully integrated and customizable software suite for student transportation, with route planning, a central operations console for administrators, and applications for caregivers, drivers, and educators. The software includes features like real-time bus tracking, continuously updated ETAs, and configurable alerts to help track users.

Via’s software supports non-emergency medical transportation, often with the same fleet of vehicles already in use for paratransit or microtransit services. Clients are transit agencies, city governments, and hospital systems.

=== Vehicles ===
Via operates a vehicle-agnostic platform so its technology can work with any type of vehicle fleet, from cars and minivans to shuttle buses, cutaways, large city buses, and school buses. Via services frequently include wheelchair accessible vehicles, electric vehicles, and autonomous vehicles. In partnership with May Mobility, Via has operated AV public transit services in cities such as Arlington, Texas, Ann Arbor, Michigan, Grand Rapids, Minnesota, and Miami, Florida.

== Financing ==
In May 2016, the company raised $100 million in Series C financing.

In November 2021, Via raised $130 million in a Series G round of financing at a $3.3 billion valuation. Investors included Janus Henderson, BlackRock, ION, and Koch Disruptive Technologies.

In February 2023, the company raised $110 million at a $3.5 billion valuation. Investors included 83North, Exor N.V., Pitango, Janus Henderson, CF Private Equity, Planven Entrepreneur Ventures, Riverpark Ventures, and ION Crossover Partners.
