= Cybereason =

American cybersecurity technology company

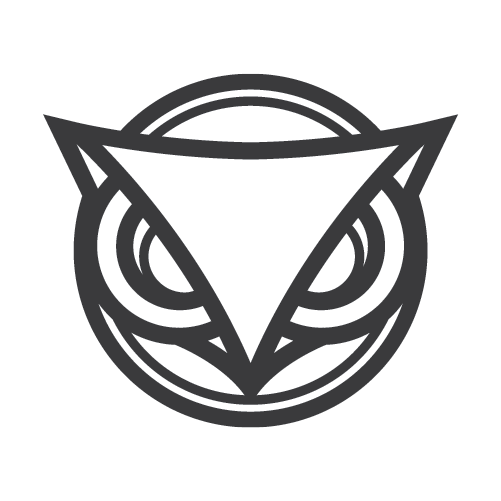
- Type: Private
- Industry: Software
- Founded: 2012; 14 years ago
- Founder: Lior Div and Yonatan Striem-Amit
- Headquarters: United States
- Key people: Manish Narula (CEO)
- Products: Security software
- Owner: LevelBlue
- Number of employees: 950
- Website: www.cybereason.com

Cybereason is an American cybersecurity technology company founded in 2012. It has offices in La Jolla, California (global HQ); London, UK (EMEA HQ); Tel Aviv, Israel; and several others around the world.

In November 2025, it was announced that LevelBlue had completed the acquisition of the company.

== History ==
Cybereason was founded in 2014 by Lior Div and Yonatan Striem-Amit. In 2014, two years after being founded and incorporated in Delaware, USA, Cybereason established its headquarters in Boston, Massachusetts. In November 2016, three months after incorporating a subsidiary in the United Kingdom, it established a new office in London.

In June 2017, Cybereason launched Malicious Life, a podcast about the history of cybersecurity. Hosted by Ran Levi, it ended its run after 258 episodes in December 2024.

In April 2018, Cybereason established an office in Sydney, a distribution partnership with Nextgen Distribution, and a channel partnership with Sydney-based security firm Seccom Global to support Australia and New Zealand.

In June 2019, Cybereason reported on "Operation Soft Cell," a massive state-sponsored espionage campaign targeting multiple global telecommunications providers. The attack was attributed to APT10 (aka Red Apollo), thought to be backed by the Chinese government.

=== IPO Plans and Aftermath ===
In February 2022, Reuters reported that Cybereason had confidentially filed to IPO later in 2022 with a target valuation of $5 billion.

However, in June 2022 the company laid off roughly 100 employees, or about 10% of its total workforce, as startup valuations plummeted. Since then, Cybereason has seen two more rounds of layoffs: about 200 employees (or about 17% of the workforce) were let go in October 2022, and then a third round in March 2024 that impacted dozens of senior employees.

In October 2022, Cybereason conceded that "the tech IPO market has essentially closed," forcing it to drop its IPO plans and hire JPMorgan Chase to find a buyer for the company.

=== Proposed Merger and Aftermath ===
In November 2024, Cybereason and Trustwave announced a definitive merger agreement, with SoftBank as the majority investor and Trustwave’s current owner, MC2 Security Fund, a private equity fund sponsored by The Chertoff Group, continuing to be a channel partner and strategic advisor. The deal was expected to close in early 2025, pending customary closing conditions and regulatory approvals, and the two companies were expected to "function independently but collaborate strategically on value-added services and capabilities."

In February 2025, CEO Eric Gan sued SoftBank Vision Fund and Liberty Strategic Capital, accusing them of putting the company at risk of bankruptcy by rejecting multiple plans for a much-needed capital infusion of as much as $150 million. Several weeks later, on March 5, 2025, Mr. Gan resigned as CEO from Cybereason, and the planned merger with Trustwave was also terminated according to an unnamed source cited by Bloomberg News. In May 2025, Eric Gan voluntarily dismissed his claims against Cybereason and its shareholders.

== Funding ==
In February 2014, Cybereason raised $4.6 million in Series A funding from Charles River Ventures (CRV).

In May 2015, Cybereason closed a $25 million Series B funding round led by Spark Capital with additional contributions from existing investor CRV and strategic investor Lockheed Martin.

In October 2015, Cybereason raised $59 million in Series C funding, with $50 million coming from new investor Softbank Group and the remainder coming from existing investors CRV and Spark Capital; this brought their total funding up to $84 million.

In June 2017, Cybereason raised $100 million in Series D funding from SoftBank, which increased the total investment in the company to $189 million since its founding in 2012.

In August 2019, Cybereason raised $200 million in new financing from SoftBank Group and its affiliates.

In July 2021, Cybereason secured $275 million in Series F funding led by Liberty Strategic Capital, a venture capital fund founded by Steven Mnuchin; as part of the deal, Mnuchin and Liberty adviser Gen. Joseph Dunford joined Cybereason’s board of directors. Later in October 2021, they raised an additional $50 million from Google Cloud, bringing the total round up to $325 million and taking their overall funding up to over $713 million.

In April 2023, Cybereason raised an additional $100 million in venture capital from SoftBank Group, which brought the total invested in the company to over $850 million; in addition, Eric Gan, SoftBank’s executive vice president, was appointed as its new CEO.

In March 2025, Cybereason announced they secured an additional $120 million in funding from SoftBank Corp., SoftBank Vision Fund 2, and Liberty Strategic Capital. They also announced that Manish Narula, CFO of Cybereason, would step into the role of CEO.

== Services ==
Cybereason offers an endpoint protection platform. It delivers antivirus software, endpoint detection and response with one agent, and a suite of managed services.

Nocturnus is Cybereason's security research arm. The Nocturnus team specializes in discovering new attack methodologies, reverse-engineering malware, and exposing new system vulnerabilities. Nocturnus was the first to discover a vaccination for the 2017 NotPetya and Bad Rabbit cyberattacks.
