= Argus Cyber Security =

Israeli automotive cyber security company

PlaxidityX (Formerly Argus Cyber Security LTD.)
- Industry: Automobile Technology
- Founded: 2013; 13 years ago
- Fate: Purchased by Continental AG in 2017 for $430 million.
- Headquarters: Tel Aviv, Israel
- Number of employees: 200

PlaxidityX (Formerly Argus Cyber Security LTD.) is an Israeli automotive cyber security company. It was purchased by Continental AG in 2017, for $430 million. In October 2017, Argus added a solution to enable OEMs to deliver over-the-air vehicle software updates.

== History ==
The company was founded in 2013, by Ofer Ben-Noon, Oron Lavi, and Yaron Galula, three ex-soldiers of Israel's Unit 8200. The Argus management team includes former employees of Daimler, Fiat Chrysler, and General Motors.

The Israeli startup is headquartered in Tel Aviv, has a team of more than 200 people and offices in Detroit, Silicon Valley, Stuttgart and Tokyo. The company has dozens of pending and granted patents and was identified as a Top 25 Technology Company To Watch by The Wall Street Journal.

As a result of an acquisition in November 2017, Argus Cyber Security is part of Germany's Continental's subsidiary Elektrobit (EB).

In December 2020, Argus Co-founder Ofer Ben-Noon stepped down from his position as CEO and was replaced by Ronen Smoly, previously Argus VP Sales.

== Partnerships ==
In January 2016, Argus partnered with Check Point Software Technologies to extend the Argus offering with Check Point Car Capsule for secure communication between vehicle and the cloud.

In July 2016, Argus was chosen to participate in Startup Autobahn, a joint project run by Daimler AG, Plug and Play, University of Stuttgart and ARENA2036.

Argus partnered with Infineon in November 2016 to create an integrated cyber security solution for central gateway protection.

In January 2017, Argus joined with Elektrobit to create a solution to protect electronic control units (ECU). The same month they announced a combined solution with Qualcomm.

In February 2017, NXP Semiconductors announced its partnership with Argus creating a joint solution including Argus IDPS and NXP Calyso MCU to detect and prevent advanced cyber attacks in real-time.

In July 2017, Argus and Riscure announced a joint 'capture the flag' competition, participants faced challenges simulating real-life automotive cyber security scenarios to win.

In June 2018, Argus partnered with Phantom Auto on a teleoperation safety technology that blocks attacks on connected vehicles.

In August 2024, Argus rebranded as PlaxidityX .

== Awards and recognition ==
- Inc. Top 20 Tech Innovators to watch in 2018
- Red Herring 2017 Top 100
- The Wall Street Journal 25 Technology Companies to Watch
- Fast Company Most Innovative Companies of 2017
- Fortune Top 3 Auto Startups of 2016
- WIRED Europe's hottest startups 2016
- ABIresearch 118 Top Up-and-coming Technology Innovators Set to Disrupt Tech Markets
