= Wiz, Inc. =

Israeli-American cloud information security company

- Type: Subsidiary
- Industry: Cybersecurity
- Founded: January 2020; 6 years ago
- Founders: Assaf Rappaport; Yinon Costica; Roy Reznik; Ami Luttwak
- Headquarters: New York City, US
- Key people: Assaf Rappaport (CEO); Dali Rajic (COO)
- Revenue: ▲US$500 million (2024)
- Owner: Alphabet Inc. (2026–present)
- Number of employees: c. 1800 (2025)
- Website: wiz.io

Wiz, Inc. is an Israeli-American cloud security company, headquartered in New York City, that has been part of Google Cloud since March 2026. The company was founded in January 2020 by Assaf Rappaport, Yinon Costica, Roy Reznik, and Ami Luttwak, all of whom previously founded Adallom. The company's platform analyzes computing infrastructure hosted in Amazon Web Services, Microsoft Azure, Google Cloud Platform, Oracle Cloud Infrastructure, and Kubernetes for combinations of risk factors that could allow malicious actors to gain control of cloud resources and/or exfiltrate valuable data.

As of November 2024, Wiz employed about 1,995 people, with most sales and marketing personnel scattered across North America and Europe while most engineering personnel are based in Tel Aviv, Israel. In August 2022, Wiz claimed to be the fastest startup ever to scale from $1 million to $100 million in annual recurring revenue (ARR), from February 2021 to approximately July 2022. In February 2024, the company claimed to have reached $350M in ARR, with a 45% market share of Fortune 100 companies.

On 11 March 2026, Alphabet Inc. acquired Wiz in a $32 billion deal.

== History ==
Wiz was founded in January 2020 by Assaf Rappaport, Yinon Costica, Roy Reznik, and Ami Luttwak, all of whom previously founded Adallom. Rappaport is CEO, Costica is VP of Product, Reznik is VP of Engineering, and Luttwak is CTO.

Wiz agreed to acquire Tel Aviv-based Raftt, a cloud-based developer collaboration platform, for $50 million in December 2023. In April 2024, the company acquired cloud detection and response startup, Gem Security, for around $350 million. Also that month, reports indicated that Wiz intended to purchase Lacework, but in May the deal fell through during the due diligence process. In November 2024, the company acquired security remediation and risk management startup Dazz for a cash-and-share deal valued at $450 million.

=== Acquisition by Alphabet Inc. ===
In March 2024, Google and Alphabet CEO Sundar Pichai reached out to Rappaport via email to express interest in a potential bid to acquire the company. Rappaport initially missed the email until May, when he met with Pichai and Google Cloud CEO Thomas Kurian at the Googleplex in Mountain View, California. Less than a month later, Google made an offer to acquire the company at a valuation of $23 billion. Initially, Wiz turned down the offer in favor of going public. However, the deal was revived due to weakness in the IPO market and a more mergers and acquisitions–friendly Trump administration, and on March 18, 2025, Google announced an all-cash acquisition of Wiz for $32 billion. Once closed, Wiz will join Google Cloud. The deal "represent[ed] the largest cybersecurity acquisition of all time [and] the most expensive acquisition Google has ever made in any sector".

In February 2026, the acquisition received unconditional approval from the European Union’s antitrust authorities, removing the final major regulatory hurdle for the deal. The European Commission concluded that the transaction would not substantially lessen competition in the cybersecurity and cloud computing markets. The clearance allowed the acquisition to proceed without any conditions in the European Economic Area, paving the way for Wiz to fully integrate into Google Cloud. It is the largest technology acquisition involving an Israeli-founded company. On March 11, 2026, the acquisition was completed.

=== Funding ===
Wiz has raised a total of $1.9 billion from a combination of venture capital funds and private investors:

- Series A — In December 2020, Wiz emerged from stealth by raising $100 million from Index Ventures, Sequoia Capital, Insight Partners and Cyberstarts.
- Series B — In April and May 2021, Wiz raised $130 million and $120 million (respectively) on a $1.7 billion valuation from Greenoaks, Index Ventures, Sequoia Capital, Insight Partners, and Cyberstarts.
- Series C — In October 2021, Wiz raised $250 million on a $6 billion valuation led by Greenoaks, and with participation from Insight Partners, Capital, Sequoia Capital, Salesforce Ventures, and CyberStarts, and individual investors Bernard Arnault and Howard Schultz.
- Series D — In February 2023, Wiz raised $300 million on a $10 billion valuation led by venture capital fund Greenoaks Capital, with participation from Lightspeed Venture Partners, along with individual investors including Bernard Arnault and Howard Schultz.
- Series E — In May 2024, Wiz raised $1 billion on a $12 billion valuation from Andreessen Horowitz, Lightspeed Venture Partners, Thrive Capital, Greylock Partners, Wellington Management, Cyberstarts, Greenoaks, Index Ventures, Salesforce Ventures, Sequoia Capital and Howard Schultz.

== Research ==
Wiz researchers have discovered and publicly disclosed the following cloud vulnerabilities:

- ChaosDB – A series of flaws in Microsoft Azure's Cosmos DB that made it possible to download, delete, or manipulate databases belonging to thousands of Azure customers.
- OMIGOD – Bugs in Open Management Infrastructure (OMI), a ubiquitous but poorly documented agent embedded in many popular Azure services, that allowed for unauthenticated remote code execution and privilege escalation.
- NotLegit – Insecure default behavior in the Azure App Service that exposed the source code of some customer applications.
- ExtraReplica – A chain of critical vulnerabilities found in the Azure Database for PostgreSQL Flexible Server that could let malicious users escalate privileges and gain access to other customers' databases after bypassing authentication.
- AttachMe – A cloud isolation vulnerability that, before it was patched by Oracle Cloud Infrastructure, could have allowed attackers to access and modify other users' OCI storage volumes without authorization.
- Hell's Keychain – A first-of-its-kind cloud service provider supply-chain vulnerability in IBM Cloud Databases for PostgreSQL that, before it was patched, could have allowed malicious actors to remotely execute code in victims' environments.
- BingBang – A misconfiguration in Azure Active Directory (AAD) that allowed Wiz researchers to modify Bing.com search results in a way that malicious actors could use to steal Office 365 credentials granting access to countless users' private emails and documents.
- DeepSeek – Wiz said it had found a trove of sensitive information in a key database from the artificial intelligence startup DeepSeek which was inadvertently exposed to the open internet.

== Project Atlas ==
Wiz launched Project Atlas in 2026 to help identify security vulnerabilities using and choosing between multiple AI models. Wiz used their Atlas platform to help discover the PHP2Shell vulnerability in PHP in August 2026.
