= Palo Alto Networks =

American technology company

Palo Alto Networks, Inc.

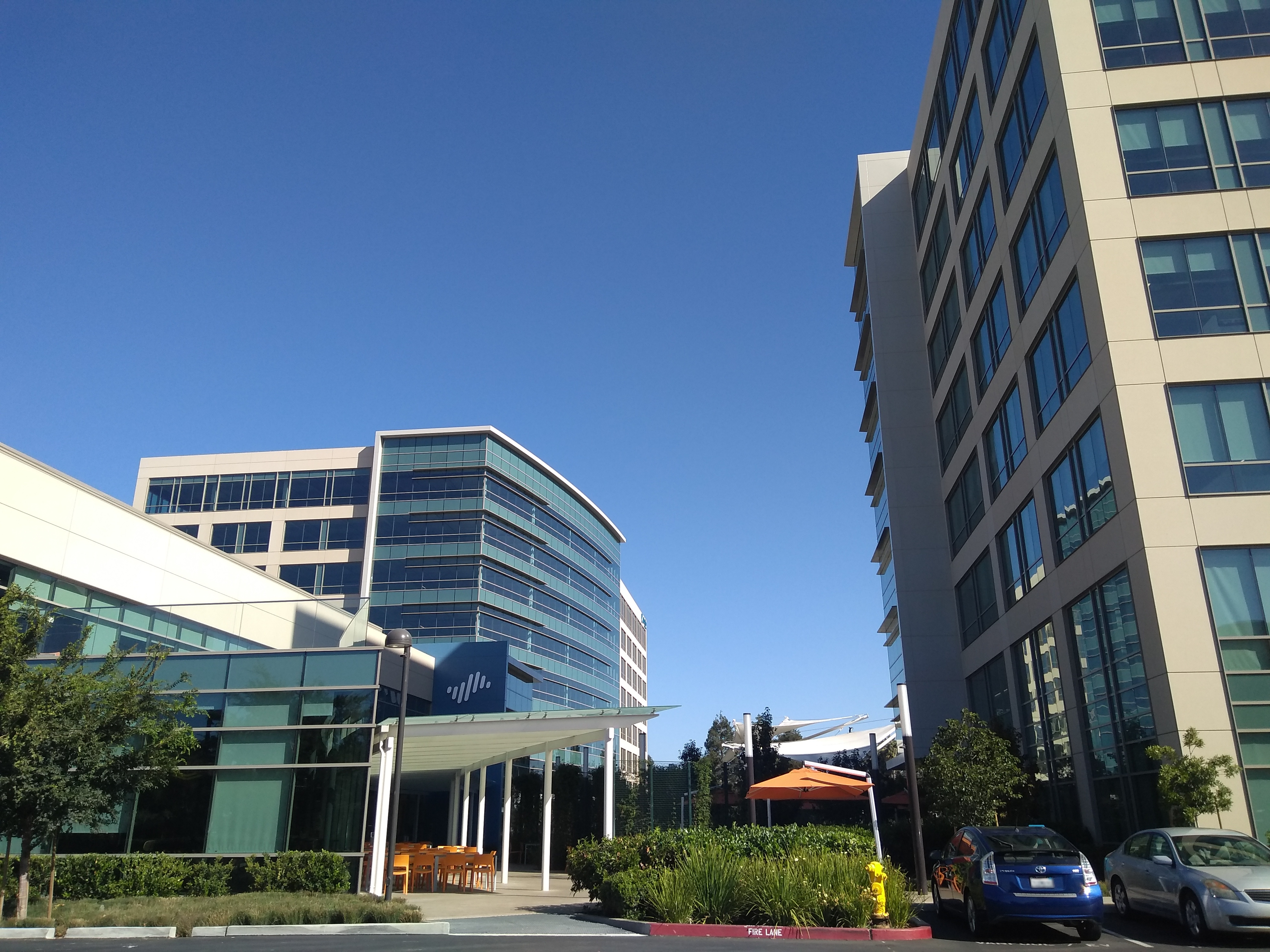
- Headquarters in Santa Clara, California
- Type: Public
- Traded as: Nasdaq: PANW; Nasdaq-100 component; S&P 100 component; S&P 500 component
- Industry: Network security Cybersecurity; Cloud computing
- Founded: March 1, 2005; 21 years ago
- Founders: Nir Zuk; Rajiv Batra
- Headquarters: Santa Clara, California, U.S.
- Area served: Worldwide
- Key people: Nikesh Arora (CEO)
- Products: PA 220, 4x0, 8x0, 32x0, 34x0, 54x0, 70x0, VM, CN firewall series Prisma SASE, Prisma Cloud, Cortex XDR, Cortex Xpanse, Cortex XSOAR, Cortex XSIAM
- Revenue: ▲US$9.22 billion (2025)
- Operating income: ▲US$1.24 billion (2025)
- Net income: ▼US$1.13 billion (2025)
- Total assets: ▲US$23.6 billion (2025)
- Total equity: ▲US$7.82 billion (2025)
- Number of employees: 16,068 (2025)
- Website: paloaltonetworks.com
- Footnotes; Financials as of July 31, 2025.

Palo Alto Networks, Inc. is an American multinational cybersecurity company with headquarters in Santa Clara, California. The core product is a platform that includes advanced firewalls and cloud-based offerings that extend those firewalls to cover other aspects of security. The company serves over 70,000 organizations in over 150 countries, including 85 of the Fortune 100. It is home to the Unit 42 threat research team and hosts the Ignite cybersecurity conference. It is a partner organization of the World Economic Forum.

In June 2018, former Google and SoftBank executive Nikesh Arora joined the company as Chairman and CEO.

== History ==
Palo Alto Networks was founded in 2005 by Nir Zuk, a former engineer from Check Point and NetScreen Technologies. Zuk, an Israeli native, began working with computers during his mandatory military service in the Israel Defense Forces in the early 1990s and served as head of software development in Unit 8200, a branch of the Israeli Intelligence Corps.

The company debuted on the NYSE on July 20, 2012, raising $260 million with its initial public offering, which was the 4th-largest tech IPO of 2012. It remained on the NYSE until October 2021 when the company transferred its listing to Nasdaq. In February 2026 Palo Alto Networks joined the Tel Aviv Stock Exchange (TASE) as a dual-listed company, and in September 2026 it became the first company to reach the NIS 1 trillion mark on TASE.

In 2014, Palo Alto Networks founded the Cyber Threat Alliance with Fortinet, McAfee, and Symantec (now NortonLifeLock), a not-for-profit organization with the goal of improving cybersecurity "for the greater good" by encouraging cybersecurity organizations to collaborate by sharing cyber threat intelligence among members. By 2018, the organization had 20 members including Cisco, Check Point, Juniper Networks, and Sophos.

In 2018, the company began opening cybersecurity training facilities around the world as part of the Global Cyber Range Initiative.

In May 2018, the company announced Application Framework, an open cloud-delivered ecosystem where developers can publish security services as SaaS applications that can be instantly delivered to customers.

In 2019, the company announced the K2-Series, a 5G-ready next-generation firewall developed for service providers with 5G and IoT requirements. In February 2019, the company announced Cortex, an AI-based continuous security platform.

In May 2026, it was reported that Palo Alto hit a market capitalization of $200 billion USD for the first time.

In August 2026, China launched a security review into Palo Alto's products within the Chinese market.

=== Acquisitions ===
- January 2014: Morta Security
- April 2014: Cyvera for approximately $200 million
- May 2015: CirroSecure
- March 2017: LightCyber for approximately $100 million
- March 2018: Cloud Security company Evident.io for $300 million. This acquisition created the Prisma Cloud division.
- April 2018: Secdo
- October 2018: RedLock for $173 million
- February 2019: Demisto for $560 million
- May 2019: Twistlock for $410 million
- June 2019: PureSec for $47 million
- September 2019: Zingbox for $75 million
- November 2019: Aporeto, Inc. for $150 million
- April 2020: CloudGenix, Inc. for $420 million
- August 2020: Crypsis Group for $265 million
- December 2020: Expanse for $1.25 billion.
- February 2021: Bridgecrew for $156 million
- November 2022: Cider Security for $300 million.
- October 2023: Announced its intent to acquire Dig Security for $400 million
- November 2023: Talon Cyber Security for $625 million
- December 2023: Dig Security for $400 million
- July 2025: Protect AI for $500 million
- July 2025: Announced agreement to acquire CyberArk for $25 billion; completed February 2026
- November 2025: Announced acquisition of Chronosphere for $3.35 billion; completed January 2026
- February 2026: Koi Security for an estimated $400 million
- April 2026: Announced agreement to acquire Portkey.
- September 2026: Announced agreement to acquire Console for an estimated $500 million.
- November 2026: Announced agreement to acquire Applied Compute for $4.5 billion.

== Threat research ==
Unit 42 is the Palo Alto Networks threat intelligence and security consulting team. They are a group of cybersecurity researchers and industry experts who use data collected by the company's security platform to discover new cyber threats, such as new forms of malware and malicious actors operating across the world. The group runs a popular blog where they post technical reports analyzing active threats and adversaries. Multiple Unit 42 researchers have been named in the MSRC Top 100, Microsoft's annual ranking of top 100 security researchers. In April 2020, the business unit consisting of Crypsis Group which provided digital forensics, incident response, risk assessment, and other consulting services merged with the Unit 42 threat intelligence team.

According to the FBI, Palo Alto Networks Unit 42 has helped solve multiple cybercrime cases, such as the Mirai Botnet and Clickfraud Botnet cases, the LuminosityLink RAT case, and assisted with "Operation Wire-Wire".

In 2018, Unit 42 discovered Gorgon, a hacking group believed to be operating out of Pakistan and targeting government organizations in the United Kingdom, Spain, Russia, and the United States. The group was detected sending spear-phishing emails attached to infected Microsoft Word documents using an exploit commonly used by cybercriminals and cyber-espionage campaigns.

In September 2018, Unit 42 discovered Xbash, a ransomware that also performs cryptomining, believed to be tied to the Chinese threat actor "Iron". Xbash is able to propagate like a worm and deletes databases stored on victim hosts. In October, Unit 42 warned of a new crypto mining malware, XMRig, that comes bundled with infected Adobe Flash updates. The malware uses the victim's computer's resources to mine Monero cryptocurrency.

In November 2018, Palo Alto Networks announced the discovery of "Cannon", a trojan being used to target United States and European government entities. The hackers behind the malware are believed to be Fancy Bear, the Russian hacking group believed to be responsible for hacking the Democratic National Committee in 2016. The malware communicates with its command and control server with email and uses encryption to evade detection.

In November 2024, Unit 42 released documentation reported to be interview scripts used by North Korean threat actors to gain employment as remote software developers with the goal of planting malware and funneling money back to the government.

In April 2026, Palo Alto researchers discovered how AI agents created in Google Cloud's Vertex AI could be used to perform malicious activities due to excessive access.

== Products ==
In 2026, Palo Alto Networks announced a product called Unit 42 Continuous Frontier AI Defense, which uses AI to find threats on corporate networks.

== Financial indicators ==
	2019	2020	2021	2022	2023	2024	2025	2026
Total revenue (USD bn)	2.9	3.4	4.3	5.5	6.9	8.0	9.2	11.5
Operating income (USD bn)	0.0	-0.2	-0.3	-0.2	0.4	0.9	1.2	0.8
Net income (USD bn)	-0.1	-0.3	-0.5	-0.3	0.4	2.6	1.1	0.3
Total assets (USD bn)	6.6	9.1	10.2	12.3	14.5	20.0	23.6	48.5
Total equity (USD bn)	1.6	1.1	0.6	0.2	1.8	5.2	7.8	27.6
Number of employees	7,010	8,010	10,470	12,560	13,950	15,290	16,070	21,920
