= Prisoner X =

Prisoner X may refer to:

== Placeholder name for prisoners ==
- Ben Zygier, held in Ayalon Prison in Israel until his death there in 2010
  - Ali-Reza Asgari, incorrectly asserted to be Prisoner X by the Tikun Olam blog
- Avri Elad (died 1993), the "third man" or "X" in the Lavon Affair, held in Ayalon Prison
- Marcus Klingberg, held from 1983 to 2003 in Israel
- Prisoner X2, an unidentified prisoner held in Ayalon Prison from about 2004 until 2018
- Tomer Eiges, or "Officer X", died in military prison awaiting trial in 2021

== Other uses ==
- Age of X-Man: Prisoner X, a 2019 comic book, part of the Age of X-Man crossover
- Prisoner X, a 2015 Canadian film
