= Censorship in Israel =

Censorship in Israel is officially carried out by the Israeli Military Censor, a unit in the Israeli government officially tasked with carrying out preventive censorship regarding the publication of information that might affect the security of Israel. The body is headed by the Israeli Chief Censor, a military official appointed by Israel's Minister of Defense, who bestows upon the Chief Censor the authority to suppress information he deems compromising from being made public in the media, such as Israel's nuclear weapons program and Israel's military operations outside its borders. On average, 2,240 press articles in Israel are censored by the Israeli Military Censor each year, approximately 240 of which in full, and around 2,000 partially.

Articles concerning potentially controversial topics must be submitted to the Israeli Military Censor in advance; failing to do so may cause the reporter to lose their right to work as a journalist in Israel and, in the case of foreign reporters, to be barred from the country.

== Censorship of Israeli press ==
The Reporters Without Borders report on Israel states that "Under Israel's military censorship, reporting on a variety of security issues requires prior approval by the authorities. In addition to the possibility of civil defamation suits, journalists can also be charged with criminal defamation and "insulting a public official". There is a freedom of information law but it is sometimes hard to implement. The confidentiality of sources is not protected by statutory law".

Every journalist working within Israel is required to be accredited by the Israeli Government Press Office. The office is allowed to deny applications based on political or security considerations.

Following the 2017 Qatar diplomatic crisis, Israel took steps to ban Qatar-based Al Jazeera by closing its Jerusalem office, revoking press cards, and asking cable and satellite broadcasters not to broadcast Al Jazeera. Defence minister Avigdor Lieberman had described some of Al Jazeera's reports as "Nazi Germany–style" propaganda. It was not clear if the measures covered Al Jazeera English, considered less strident.

=== Gag orders ===
In late 2009, Israel issued a gag order against the Israeli media reporting on facts surrounding the Anat Kamm–Uri Blau affair. The gag order was ultimately subject to widespread criticism and publicity as the details of the case were reported overseas. The scandal centered around leaked documents from the Israeli Defense Force which suggested the military had engaged in extrajudicial killings.

A gag order concerning the Prisoner X affair prevented Israeli coverage of the topic for more than two years. After numerous foreign media outlets revealed the prisoner's identity and other key facts in February 2013, a court partially lifted the gag order, allowing Israeli media to quote foreign press reports but offer no original reporting.

On 13 November 2013 a gag order concerning a famous Israeli singer suspected of sex with girls below the age of consent was issued. While the traditional media did not advertise the name of the singer, social media platforms users like Facebook published the singer name and incriminating photos. On 20 November Eyal Golan released a press statement announcing he was the suspected singer.

In 2014, a blanket gag order regarding the detainment of Avera Mengitsu was put into place. It lasted 10 months, until July 9, 2015. Discussions took place in social media forums and some reports were published on foreign websites. Some clues about the affair were leaked to different Arabic media outlets, from which the story made its way to international media and was published to Tikun Olam by blogger Richard Silverstein. The gag order was lifted following a request from Haaretz. The Associated Press speculated that a statement made by Khaled Mashal the previous day, in which he spoke of an Israeli request through a European intermediary for the release of "two soldiers and two bodies", may have "forced Israel's hand".

In August 2017, an Israeli court issued a month-long gag order on a state witness deal regarding the ongoing criminal investigations of Prime Minister Benjamin Netanyahu.

=== Gaza war and Al Jazeera law ===
On 1 April 2024, the Knesset passed the "Al Jazeera law", which gives the Israeli government the power to close foreign news networks operating in the country and confiscate their equipment if they are deemed to be threats to national security. The law, passed in a 71 to 10 vote, was planned to be used against the Qatari news channel Al Jazeera, according to Minister of Communications Shlomo Karhi. The law can be applied for an initial 45-day period but can be renewed.

On 21 April 2024, the Communications Ministry shut down and seized the broadcasting equipment of an Associated Press livestream overlooking northern Gaza, claiming that the wire service was providing information on the live stream to Al Jazeera, one of its clients, in violation of the law. The AP had refused an earlier verbal order the previous week to shut down the feed. According to the AP, it was in compliance with Israel's censorship rules prohibiting the coverage of details that could endanger Israeli lives such as troop movements and characterized the government's actions as "abusive". Later the same day, Karhi ordered the return of the equipment to the AP.

In September 2024, Israel raided and shut down the Al Jazeera bureau in Ramallah. This followed Israel's previous shutdown of the Al Jazeera office in East Jerusalem four months earlier.

On 24 November 2024, Israel's government ordered a boycott of the newspaper Haaretz by government officials and anyone working for a government-funded body, and banned government advertising with the newspaper. According to The Guardian, Haaretz "had published a series of investigations of wrongdoing or abuses by senior officials and the armed forces, and has long been in the crosshairs of the current government."

As of 2025, Israel ranks 108th in the World Press Freedom Index, previously 88th in 2020. This assessment focuses solely on the media situation within Israel and does not account for the widespread killings of journalists in Gaza. According to a report by +972 Magazine, Israel's military censorship reached unprecedented levels in 2024. The report indicates that, in that year, the publication of 1,635 articles was completely banned, while another 6,265 articles faced partial censorship. These figures suggest that, on average, more than 20 reports and articles per day were subjected to direct intervention by the military censorship unit.

Israeli military censorship again peaked during the Twelve-Day War, targeting the publication of strikes on or near military targets in Israel.

In August 2025, the Israeli Army Censorship Office issued an order prohibiting the publication of any information regarding the disappearance of four Israeli soldiers during the "El Zaitoun" operation in Gaza.

=== Twelve-Day War ===
Media restrictions in Israel were further intensified after Iranian missile strikes in June 2025 that resulted in the deaths of 28 individuals. Israel has acknowledged that it experienced over 50 missile strikes during the Twelve-Day War with Iran; however, the full extent of the damage may remain unknown due to stringent press limitations. As stated by the Israeli government press office, any broadcast originating from a "war zone or missile strike site," particularly in proximity to military installations and oil refineries, necessitates written authorization from the military censor. Throughout the conflict with Iran, foreign journalists in Israel were prohibited from filming locations affected by Iranian missile attacks.

=== 2026 Iran war ===
During the 2026 Iran War between Israel and Iran, the Israeli military censor imposed strict restrictions on both domestic and international media coverage. Journalists were prohibited from publishing detailed information about Iranian missile impacts, defensive interceptor locations, and certain images or footage that could be considered operationally sensitive. The censorship body required media outlets to submit content for review before publication, thereby limiting real‑time reporting and the release of certain visual material.

== Censorship of Palestinian press ==
Before the Oslo Accords, Israeli police and government controlled the Palestinian territories, censoring access to books and information for Palestinians. By 1991, some 10,000 books were banned, along with fax machines, and a number of phone lines had been cut. In addition, publications of content considered "politically significant" in the West Bank was prohibited, and Arab publications were prevented from being distributed.

Reporters Without Borders have raised serious concern regarding the treatment of journalists in Israel, particularly Palestinian journalists. Their current section on Israel states: "[…] journalists are exposed to open hostility from members of the government. Smear campaigns have been waged against media outlets and journalists by politicians with the help of their party and supporters, exposing the targets to harassment and anonymous messages and forcing them seek personal protection. […] The Israel Defence Forces often violate the rights of Palestinian journalists, especially when they are covering demonstrations or clashes in the West Bank or Gaza Strip"

In their section on Palestine, they write that "the Israeli forces have continued to subject Palestinian journalists to arrest, interrogation, and administrative detention, often without any clear grounds. In recent years, the Israeli authorities have also closed several Palestinian media outlets for allegedly inciting violence."

On 7 December 2021, Reporters Without Borders and the Euro-Mediterranean Human Rights Monitor called for an immediate end to the Israeli travel bans that prevent dozens of Palestinian journalists from leaving the West Bank and Gaza Strip. At that time, RSF was aware of at least 21 Palestinian journalists who were banned from travelling abroad. In many cases, the travel bans have remained in place for years.

On 18 August 2022, Israeli forces issued military orders imposing the closure of seven prominent Palestinian human rights groups' offices after accusing them of operating as fronts for terrorist organizations. The UN and other international organizations condemned Israel's escalating attacks against Palestinian civil society.

=== Military censorship ===
The Israeli Military Censor has the power to prevent publication of certain news items. The censorship rules largely concern military issues such as not reporting if a missile hit or missed its target, troop movements, etc. but it is also empowered to control information about the oil industry and water supply. Journalists who bypass the military censor or publish items that were censored may be subject to criminal prosecution and jail time; the censor also has the authority to close newspapers. However, these extreme measures have been rarely used. One notable instance where a newspaper was closed temporarily was in the case of the Kav 300 affair where it was eventually discovered that the censor was used by the Shin Bet to cover up internal wrongdoings in the agency and led to one of the biggest public scandals in Israel during the 1980s. Following the incident the two main papers, Haaretz and Yediot Ahronot, stopped participating in the Editors' Committee.

In 1996 a new agreement was reached and the Editors' Committee resumed operation. The new agreement allowed military censorship only of articles clearly harmful to national security and allowed the supreme court to override military decisions.

According to information provided by the military censor in response to a Freedom of Information request, in 2017 the censor banned the publication of 271 articles outright, and fully or partially redacted 21% of the articles submitted to it.

In 2018, the censor prohibited the publication of 363 news articles, and partially or fully redacted 2,712 news items submitted to it for prior review. This amounts to more than one news piece being censored and seven news items being redacted per day, on average.

One very commonly used way for Israeli media to circumvent censorship rules is to leak items to foreign news sources, which by virtue of being located outside of Israel are not subject to Israeli censorship. Once published, the Israeli media can simply quote the story.

Israeli laws outlaws hate speech and "expressing support for illegal or terrorist organizations". Section 173 of the legal code makes it a crime to publish any "publication that is liable to crudely offend the religious faith or sentiment of others."

In addition to media censorship, Israeli cinemas are subject to regulation regarding the exhibition of pornography and television stations face restrictions on early broadcasting of programs that are unsuitable for children.

In 2024, the military censor completely banned 1,635 press articles and redacted parts of 6,265 others.

== Killing of journalists ==
In 2019, Christophe Deloire, director-general of Reporters Without Borders, accused Israel of war crimes after two journalists were shot and killed by the Israeli Defense Forces in Gaza while covering a protest. In an interview with the Jerusalem Post, Deloire said that "when Israel shot those journalists, it was intentional… The journalists could be clearly identified as journalists, with cameras and jackets and it could not be just by chance".

A commission of inquiry mandated by the United Nations Human Rights Council came to the conclusion that the shooting with live ammunition by the Israeli Defense Forces, which ultimately resulted in 183 casualties, was a "serious human rights and humanitarian law violations" which "may constitute war crimes or crimes against humanity". The Commission found "reasonable grounds" to believe that Israeli snipers shot at journalists, while knowing they were clearly recognizable as such.

According to the Committee to Protect Journalists, 18 Palestinian journalists were killed in Israel and the Occupied Palestinian Territories between 2001 and 2021.

In 2021, Israel bombed and completely destroyed the building with the headquarters of the Associated Press and Al Jazeera in the Gaza Strip.

In 2022, Palestinian-American journalist Shireen Abu Akleh was killed with a shot to her head while covering an operation of the Israel Defense Forces in the Palestinian city of Jenin. Upon doing its own investigation, American news channel CNN concluded that her death was the result of a targeted Israeli killing. On 5 September, the IDF admitted a "high possibility" that the journalist was "accidentally hit" by army fire, but said that, despite US requests to do so, it would not undertake a criminal investigation into her death.

In the six months following the deadly Hamas attack on October 7, 2023, Reporters Without Borders reports more than 100 journalists were killed by the Israel Defense Forces in Gaza.

In 2024, the Committee to Protect Journalists ranked Israel as the second worst country in the world for allowing the murderers of journalists to go unpunished.

According to the Committee to Protect Journalists, in 2024 and 2025, the majority of journalists and media workers killed around the world were killed by Israel.

== Notable incidents ==
- In 1960 two science fiction stories were published that circumvented censorship. The first was about Rudolf Teichmann and told the story of Eichmann's kidnapping. Uri Avnery's HaOlam HaZeh magazine published a story about the Lavon Affair.
- Mordechai Vanunu who served 18 years in prison for treason and espionage was released in 2004, but is still under restrictions on speech and movement. A BBC reporter was barred from the country after publishing an interview with him without handing it over to the censors first.
- Israel has banned the use of the word Nakba in Israeli Arab schools and textbooks. Israeli Prime Minister Benjamin Netanyahu justified the ban by saying that the term was "propaganda against Israel".
- The death of Ben Zygier in 2010, an Australian-Israeli citizen who was allegedly recruited by Mossad, was censored until Australian news media broke the story in early 2013.
- Early in 2016, the Military Censor wrote to at least 30 Israeli bloggers and Facebook page owners, demanding that any postings with military or security-related content be submitted for review before publication. The request has the force of law.
- In September 2024, the Israeli military besieged and forcibly shut down the offices of Al Jazeera Arabic in Ramallah, despite the city being designated Area A under the Oslo Accords.

== Banned films ==
Israel banned all films produced in Germany from 1956 until 1967.

- 1957: The Girl in the Kremlin was banned because it may have harmed Israel's diplomatic relations with Moscow.
- 1957: China Gate was banned in Israel for indulging in excessive cruelty. The Israeli film censorship board indicated the film depicted Chinese and Russian soldiers as "monsters".
- 1965: Goldfinger played for six weeks before the Nazi past of Gert Fröbe, who played the title villain, was disclosed, despite him leaving the party in 1937. However the ban was lifted once a Jewish family publicly thanked him for hiding two German Jews from the Gestapo during World War II.
- 1973: Hitler: The Last Ten Days was banned in a unanimous decision by the censorship board that Alec Guinness's Hitler was represented in too human a light.
- 1988: Martin Scorsese's The Last Temptation of Christ was banned on the grounds that it could hurt the feelings of Christian believers in the Holy Land. The Supreme Court of Israel later overturned the decision.
- 2002: Jenin, Jenin was banned by the Israeli Film Ratings Board on the premise that it was libelous and might offend the public. The Supreme Court of Israel later overturned the decision. The Lod District court reinstated the ban in 2021 after determining that the film defamed Israeli army reserve officer Nissim Magnagi after 5 years of legal proceedings.

== Laws ==
- Law for Prevention of Damage to State of Israel through Boycott
- Nakba Law

== See also ==
- Freedom of information
- Freedom of speech in Israel
- Media of Israel
- Night letter
- Nakba denial
- Human rights in Israel
