= Abu Ali Express =

Telegram channel

- Website type: Telegram news channel
- Available in: Hebrew, English
- Country of origin: Israel
- Founder: Gilad Cohen
- Editor: Gilad Cohen
- Website: abualiexpress.com; t.me/abualiexpress (Telegram channel)
- Users: Hebrew - over 564,000; English - over 31,700

Abu Ali Express (Hebrew: אבו עלי אקספרס) is an Israeli channel that covers Arab affairs on social media, including Telegram and Twitter, as well as on its own website. The page is run by Israeli citizen Gilad Cohen, In 2022, after Israeli newspaper Haaretz revealed that the channel operator was working for the IDF, the publication of Cohen's name was initially banned by a censorship decision of Israeli Military Censor, on the grounds that Cohen had access to sensitive information and performed a sensitive role. A few weeks later, however, the IDF changed its position, claiming that Cohen had never been exposed to any classified information.

As of September 2022, it was the Telegram channel with the most views per post in Israel. Stories first published by Abu Ali Express have been often reproduced in the mainstream Israeli media, including in Maariv, Globes, Ynet, Arutz Sheva, as well as on Israeli television.

During the Gaza war in 2023–2024, the channel hit new records with over 25 million views and 30,000 new subscribers in one day, and over 100,000 new subscribers who joined throughout the fighting.

In September 2025, the channel conducted an exclusive interview with Israeli Prime Minister Benjamin Netanyahu.

== History ==
The page "Abu Ali Express" first appeared as an "alternative news source" on "Arab affairs" on Facebook in 2018; shortly after, the page was removed from Facebook, and a new account was then opened on Telegram; two Twitter accounts – one in Hebrew, one in English – followed. For the following two years, the pages grew to over 100,000 followers, with its followers led to believe "Abu Ali" was actually a member of the Israeli Arab community.

According to Middle East Eye, Israeli citizen Gilad Cohen was hired by Major General Herzi Halevi soon after the outbreak of the 2018–2019 Gaza border protests when masses of Palestinians in Gaza began marching in protest demonstrations along the Gaza-Israeli border.

In May 2021, during the Israeli-Gaza war, the channel hit a record of 6.7 million views per day, posting many exclusive articles during the fighting, which were then cited by many media outlets. Shortly after, Israeli newspaper Haaretz posted an article suggesting that "Abu Ali Express" was actually a channel run by Cohen, at the time a paid consultant to the Israel Defense Forces (IDF), who had chosen "Abu Ali" as a pseudonym.

The account has been the source of a number of noteworthy reports that were afterwards cited by other media. Abu Ali Express was, for example, the source for the report that Qatari funds were entering the Gaza Strip in suitcases. Before it was revealed that the page was run by one of its paid consultants, IDF spokespersons had themselves recommended Abu Ali Express as a source of information concerning the situation in Gaza.

Prior to the disclosure of the page's connection to the IDF, Abu Ali Express has been critical of Israeli journalists who expressed criticism of the way the IDF conducted operations in Gaza. The page was also often critical of journalists who question the army. When the military correspondent for Walla, Amir Bohbot, wrote that the army's response to Gaza rocket fire has been weak, his opinion was dismissed in an Abu Ali article bearing the heading: "Israeli reporters in the service of the enemy", characterizing Bohbot as a "vehicle of Hamas propaganda".

During the Gaza war in 2023–2024, the channel hit new records with over 25 million views and 30,000 new subscribers in one day, and over 100,000 new subscribers who joined throughout the fighting.

In September 2025, Abu Ali Express conducted an exclusive interview with Israeli Prime Minister Benjamin Netanyahu. According to Israeli media reports, this was the first time worldwide that a sitting head of government granted an interview to an anonymous Telegram channel. The unusual choice sparked wide coverage and debate in Israeli media outlets, including Haaretz, TheMarker, and Ynet, which emphasized Netanyahu’s decision to bypass traditional news organizations in favor of a social media platform of uncertain authorship.

== Influence and popularity ==
Since its establishment, Abu Ali Express has become one of the most popular Telegram channels in Israel. The channel has been recognized as an accessible and rapid source of information on events in the Arab world, often publishing footage and updates before mainstream media outlets. Reports first appearing on Abu Ali Express have frequently been cited in major Israeli newspapers and television broadcasts, including Maariv, Globes, Ynet, and Channel 7. Its broad reach and use of simple language and visuals have been noted as contributing to greater public understanding of complex developments in the Middle East.

== Reception ==
Abu Ali Express has been noted by commentators and media professionals for its ability to provide rapid updates during times of crisis, especially during escalations in Gaza. Some Israeli journalists and analysts have acknowledged the channel’s role in shaping the news agenda by publishing exclusive information and footage that later reached mainstream outlets. Beyond its journalistic impact, the channel has built a large and engaged online community, with hundreds of thousands of followers actively sharing and discussing its content. Its wide distribution and influence have made it a significant actor in the Israeli digital media landscape.

== The identity of the creator of "Abu Ali Express" ==
In 2021, Israeli newspaper Haaretz revealed that the page was run by an Israeli named Gilad Cohen, who at the time was working as a "psyops" (psychological warfare) operator, paid by the IDF. Cohen's job was to identify and analyze trends and turning points among the Palestinians, especially in Gaza. The channel didn't state that it was run by a paid consultant to the IDF, and the Israeli army also did not disclose its cooperation with Cohen. Nonetheless, according to Haaretz, Cohen had initially served as a junior officer in the IDF's Office of the Coordinator of Government Activities in the Territories (COGAT).

After the publication in Haaretz, two associations of Israeli journalists contacted Deputy Chief of Staff Halevi to receive explanations about the defamation of colleagues by someone who served as a consciousness consultant to senior IDF officers. At the time, the IDF informed the Israeli journalists that they were officially forbidden to publish Cohen's name in Israeli media, by a censorship order issued by Israel's military justice, on the grounds that Cohen had been exposed to sensitive information and performed a sensitive role. A few weeks later, however, the IDF changed its position, claiming that Cohen had never been exposed to any classified information, and the censorship on his name was lifted.

Shortly after Haaretz discovered that the popular channel was run by Cohen, at the time a paid consultant to the IDF, the newspaper dedicated an editorial to it, regretting that "as if it were not enough that the IDF is using taxpayers’ money to pay the director of a private news channel for psyops, it emerges that the channel does not confine itself to disseminating information but also attacks Israeli journalists". Furthermore, the newspaper regretted that such criticism of part of the Israeli media had been "done by a news channel operated by someone the IDF hired as an adviser for psychological warfare on the social networks".
