= Anat Kamm–Uri Blau affair =

Leak of classified IDF documents

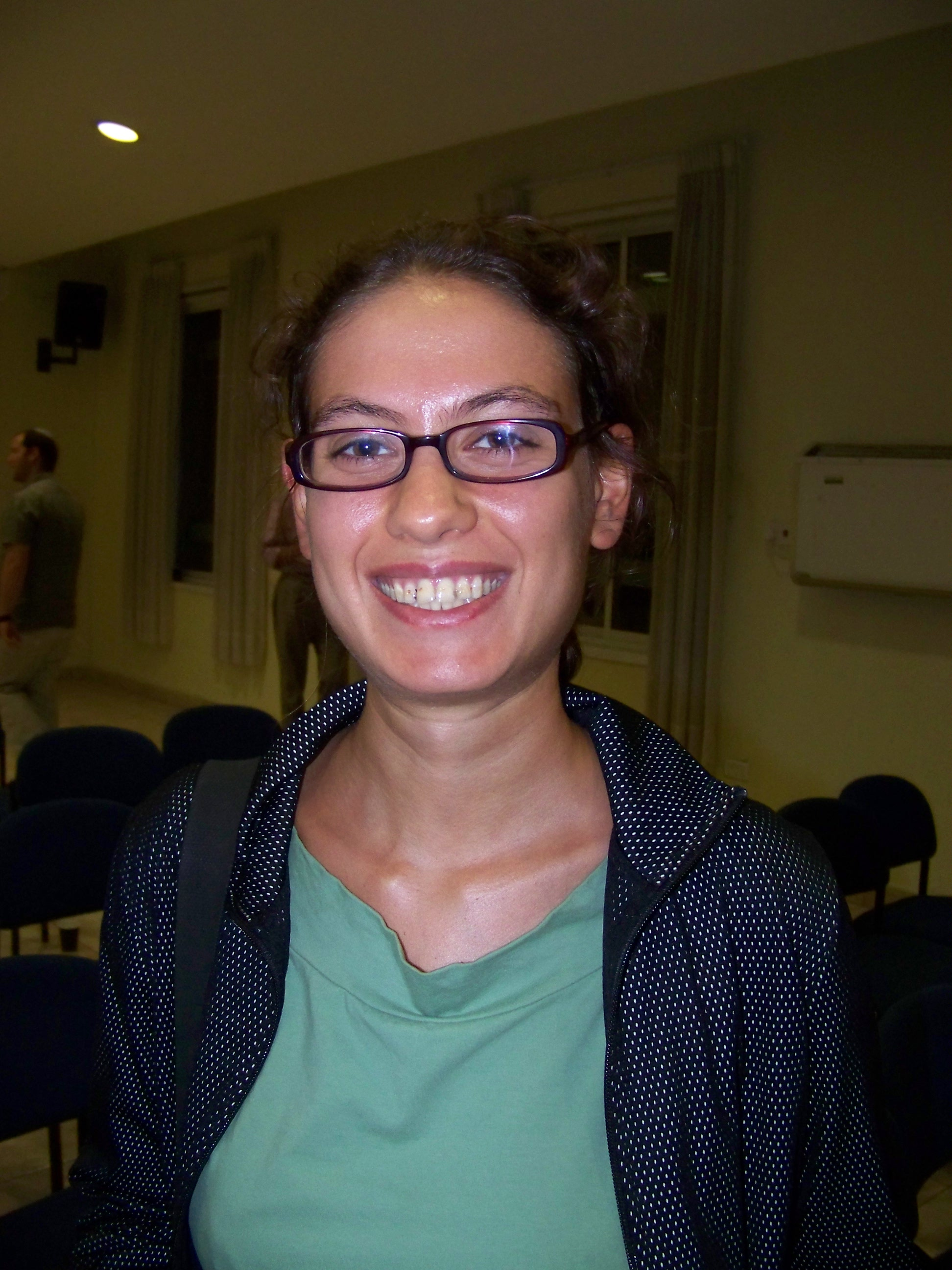
Anat Kamm (2008)

The Anat Kamm–Uri Blau affair refers to a leak of thousands of classified Israel Defense Forces (IDF) documents by the former Israeli soldier Anat Kamm.

During her military service as an assistant in the Central Command bureau, Kamm secretly copied thousands of classified documents, including many confidential documents. After she finished her military service, Kamm copied the documents to a CD and leaked it to the Israeli Haaretz journalist Uri Blau. For these acts, Kamm was later convicted of espionage and of providing confidential information without authorization.

Information from the leak suggested that the military had defied a ruling by the Supreme Court of Israel against assassinating wanted militants in the West Bank who could potentially be arrested safely.

Facts in the case were subjected to an Israeli gag order. Given that Kamm worked as a gossip journalist dealing with media affairs, the case became well known to journalists, who started reporting on it using indirect descriptions. The gag order was ultimately circumvented and broken from abroad, notably through U.S.-based blogsite Tikun Olam.

According to the indictment, Kamm illegally copied over 2,000 classified documents during her military service at the IDF. Israeli law enforcement sources said the documents include "operational military information, security and situation assessments, meetings' minutes and protocols, highly sensitive intelligence information, orders of deployment and battle, drill briefings, and warfare doctrines for the West Bank". Shin Bet chief Yuval Diskin said that the case "had the potential to cause grave damage to state security", and defined the documents as "the kind that any intelligence agency would be delighted to get its hands on".

== People involved in the affair ==
=== Anat Kamm ===
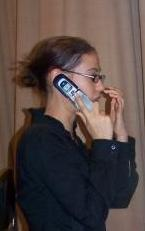
Anat Kamm at the Eilat Journalism Conference, December 2008

Anat Kamm or Anat Kam (Hebrew: ענת קם, born 1987) is an Israeli journalist.

Kamm was born in 1987 in Jerusalem. She studied at the Hebrew University Secondary School. In her youth, she wrote for the local newspaper Jerusalem (now Yediot Jerusalem) and for the youth channel of the Israeli website Walla!.

In 2005, Kamm began her military service in the Israeli Defence Forces. In July 2005, she was assigned to work as a clerk in the office of the commander of the Israeli Central Command. In January 2006, she began her training at an officer's course, but was eventually eliminated and afterwards was assigned to work as an assistant in the office of the commander of Israeli Central Command, Major General Yair Naveh.

After she finished her military service, she studied for a bachelor's degree in History and Philosophy at Tel Aviv University. In August 2007, she worked as a reporter for Walla!, an internet news portal then owned by the Bezeq and Haaretz groups. She was employed there until 10 March 2010, when she announced a leave of absence.

=== Uri Blau ===
Uri Blau (Hebrew: אורי בלאו, born 1977) is an Israeli writer and journalist and currently an investigative reporter for the Haaretz newspaper, specializing in military affairs.

== Details of the leak ==
In 2008, Blau published a report based on these documents, which said that the IDF senior command planned and executed targeted killings of three people, in violation of an earlier 2006 ruling of the Israeli Supreme Court limiting the circumstances in which such a tactic could be used.

"This is an arrest operation," the document said, attributing the quote to Naveh. "But in case [the soldiers] identify one of the senior leaders of the Islamic Jihad, Walid Obeid, Ziad Malaisha, Adham Yunis, they have permission to open fire in accordance with their appraisal of the situation during the operation."

The Chief of General Staff, Lieutenant General Gabi Ashkenazi was angered by the leak of highly classified documents, and ordered an investigation about its source.

Following a petition for investigation by two Israeli leading human rights attorneys, the Attorney-General Menahem Mazuz responded in a letter challenging the allegations made by Blau:

Regarding the killing of Malaisha, Mazuz wrote, "The IDF operation met all the conditions laid down in the [Supreme Court targeted killing ruling]. The attack took place after the possibility of arresting the fugitives was ruled out as being impossible to achieve under the circumstances and after it was made clear to the soldiers that arrest was the first preference."

Mazuz added "the legal aspects of the operation were examined at each one of the planning stages and there is no basis to the charge that the IDF 'ignored' the High Court's instructions.... On the contrary, the operational officers in the general staff, who had close legal consultation, were aware of the High Court instructions and stressed and carried them out in all stages of the planning and the approval of the operation."

According to documents released by The Tel Aviv District Court, Kamm said during her interrogation: "There were some aspects of the IDF's operational procedures in the West Bank that I felt should be public knowledge... When I was burning the CDs I kept thinking that history tends to forgive people who expose war crimes". The Israeli police secured a gag order prohibiting Israeli media from reporting on Kamm's arrest, and the reasons for it. The charges against Kamm do not relate to her journalistic activities as a media correspondent, but rather to being a journalistic source.

== Publication of the affair ==
Despite the fact that numerous foreign media outlets, as well as local blogs, had reported on the case and her identity, there was a gag order within the mainstream media. No printed newspaper had published her name, though many have published reports criticizing the authorities for imposing the gag and preventing them from telling their readers about the major story. The first overseas reporting on the case came in the Tikun Olam blog, which collaborated with Israeli bloggers and journalists to bring the story into the public consciousness.

After pressure from articles in the foreign media and from the Israeli press itself, which resented its muzzling, the gag order was removed on 8 April and an indictment was published accusing Kamm of espionage and damaging the security of the state. She faced a possible penalty of life in prison. Reaction among some in the public has been especially harsh, with some calling her a spy and traitor. Kamm's trial was scheduled to begin in May 2010, unless her attorneys arrived at a plea bargain with the prosecution.

Though the prosecution originally sought the gag order, in this case Kamm and her attorneys felt it was in her interest to honor it as well. She has exerted great pressure on her supporters not to publicize her arrest or the charges against her. She asked the Hebrew Wikipedia to remove the article about her (although a deletion vote was opened before her request was made), raised controversy both within the Hebrew Wikipedia community and among free speech and free press advocates within Israel and abroad.

The case raised profound questions about the balance between national security and press scrutiny. Advocates for human rights and democracy both within Israel and outside are closely monitoring the case. The Paris-based Reporters Without Borders issued a statement saying that "Defence of national security is a legitimate objective but censorship must not be used to prevent the Israel Defense Forces from being held responsible if they broke the law."

Although a gag order was initially issued in late January 2010 while Kamm was in house arrest, the Israeli journalist Yitzhak Tessler of NRG Ma'ariv was the first to refer to the affair in his column where he called journalists to find ways to make the publish the details surrounding the affair. Beside several Israeli blogs, that soon deleted the information they published about the affair (some deleted the information due to the gag order and some due to a request from Kamm herself) and The Seventh Eye, an Israeli site that discusses the investigation and criticism of the Israeli media, which dropped hints about the affair, no Israeli media outlet published any details about Kamm's arrest.

Outside of Israel, the first to published details of affair (in mid-March 2010) was Richard Silverstein, a Jewish-American blogger. The first full publication (by an established media source) appeared at the end of March 2010 in the Jewish news agency Jewish Telegraphic Agency (JTA) from the United States. In the following days the affair was published in many newspapers and news agencies. After the details of the affair were published in various media outlets worldwide, the Israeli media began to carefully hint about the affair. The Haaretz newspaper and Channel 10 filed a petition to the District Court in Tel Aviv against the gag order, which was eventually lifted on 8 April.

With the removal of the gag order an extensive discussion was held in the Israeli media about Kamm's actions. The dominant approach in the media was that Kamm's actions risked lives without a real justification. Various parties have supported Kamm's actions, including Haaretz. Richard Silverstein classified Kamm on the same level of Julian Assange and Chelsea Manning, as a world-class whistleblower.

== Legal proceedings ==
On 14 January 2010, Kamm was indicted for espionage.

On 6 February 2011, Kamm was convicted in the Tel Aviv District Court after pleading guilty in a plea bargain to leaking more than 2,000 secret military documents to Haaretz. The plea bargain contained that Kamm would not be charged with damaging national security, which carried a life sentence if convicted. Instead, she was charged with leaking classified materials, which carries a 15-year maximum sentence. The prosecution was expected to ask for a nine-year sentence.

On 30 October 2011, Kamm was sentenced to four and a half years in prison and 18 months probation. The panel of judges ruled that the two years Kamm had spent under house arrest would not be deducted from her sentence. Kamm's defense appealed the sentence to the Israeli Supreme Court, claiming that the sentence was too harsh. Kamm also requested that her sentence be deferred until a decision was made on the appeal. In a hearing before Supreme Court justice Miriam Naor, the prosecution accused Kamm of posing a major threat to the state, and claiming that due to her actions, "we are paying the price to this day." Prosecutors also claimed that it was odd that Kamm complained of being judged prematurely by the press when she had previously argued that the public had a right to the information contained in the documents she leaked. Justice Naor accepted the prosecution's arguments and rejected Kamm's appeal. However, she was given three extra days of freedom so she could undergo a medical examination. On 23 November, Kamm arrived at Neve Tirtza Women's Prison in Ramla to begin serving her sentence. Kamm appealed her sentence to the Israeli Supreme Court. On 31 December 2012, the Supreme Court granted her appeal and shortened her sentence to three and a half years by majority decision, noting that she had confessed to the crime, cooperated with the investigation, spent a considerable period of time under house arrest, and is unlikely to make repeat violations. Justices Hanan Melcer and Edna Arbel voted in favor of reducing her penalty, while Noam Sohlberg voted against.

In September 2012, Uri Blau was sentenced to four months of community service for his role in the leak.

In February 2013, Anat Kamm demanded NIS 2 million in compensation from Haaretz. In a letter from her attorney, Ilan Bombach, it was claimed that the newspaper's actions in exposing her as the source of the leaks caused her "great harm" by destroying her budding journalism career and academic studies, and threatened to sue for compensation in court unless the newspaper paid. Kamm was released after 26 months in January 2014.

== See also ==
- Chelsea Manning
