= Yair Naveh =

Israeli general

- יאיר נוה
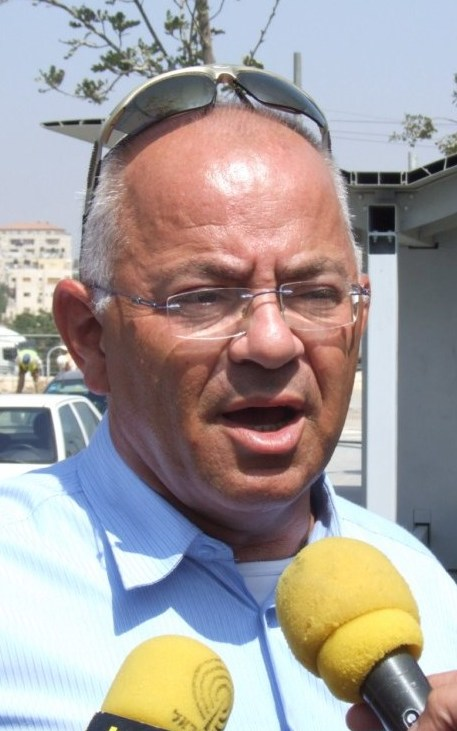
- Born: 5 September 1957 (age 69); Jerusalem, Israel
- Military career
- Allegiance: Israel
- Branch: General Staff
- Service years: 1975–2007, 2010–2015
- Rank: Aluf
- Commands: Golani Brigade, Infantry Corps, Gaza Division, Home Front Command, General Staff
- Conflicts: First Lebanon War; Second Lebanon War; Operation Bringing Home the Goods

Yair Naveh (Hebrew: יאיר נוה; born 5 September 1957) is a major general (reserve) in the Israel Defense Forces and a former Deputy Chief of the General Staff.

== Biography ==
Naveh grew up in Bnei Brak. He was active in the Bnei Akiva youth movement, and studied at the Netiv Meir Yeshiva, with two classmates who would also become IDF major generals - Yishai Ber and Elazer Stern.

=== Education ===
Naveh holds a bachelor's degree in history and political science, as well as a master's degree in political science and Middle Eastern studies, both from the University of Haifa.

== Military service ==
In 1975, he was drafted into the IDF's Golani Infantry Brigade, where he served in all positions and climbed the ranks from Company Commander to Brigade Commander.

Naveh was previously the head of Israeli Home Front Command until nominated by former prime minister Ariel Sharon to his post as Central Command chief. It is believed by some Israelis that Sharon nominated Naveh because he is the highest ranked religious officer and that as head of Central Command, he would be forced to carry out the evacuation of West Bank settlements in 2005.

In 2006, Naveh predicted that King Abdullah would fall and that he would be Jordan's last king, drawing an angry reaction from Jordan, for which Israel had to apologize on Naveh's behalf.

In 2008, Naveh's name was tied in with the alleged instructions to assassinate commanders in Palestinian militant organizations contrary to a court order. This alleged involvement was revealed through the documents leaked to Haaretz journalist Uri Blau by Naveh's former secretary, Anat Kamm.

In October 2010, Defense Minister Ehud Barak has approved the appointment of Major General Yair Naveh, 53, as IDF deputy chief of staff replacing Maj.-Gen. Benny Gantz. He was recommended for the post by the IDF Chief of Staff, Lieutenant-General Gabi Ashkenazi.

On 1 February 2011, General Naveh was appointed as the stopgap IDF Chief of Staff, and was expected to succeed outgoing Chief of Staff Gen. Gabi Ashkenazi on 14 February 2011. Naveh was appointed by Defense Minister Ehud Barak after Gen. Yoav Galant's appointment was withdrawn by Israeli Prime Minister Netanyahu. Ultimately, Benny Gantz was confirmed for the job and Naveh remained deputy chief of staff until January 2013. He retired from the military in 2015.

The following is a list of positions Major General Yair Naveh has held during his service in the IDF:

- 1989: Commander of the Brigade along the border with Lebanon.
- 1991: Commander of the Golani Unit.
- 1994: Head of Safety Department of the Ground Forces.
- 1996: Chief Infantry and Paratroops officer.
- 1999: Commander of the Gaza Division.
- 2001: Chief of Staff of Army Headquarters.
- 2003: Awarded rank of Major General and appointed as GOC Homefront Command.
- 2005: Appointed GOC Central Command.
- 2010: Appointed Deputy Chief of Staff of IDF.

== Business career ==
After leaving military service in 2007, Naveh was appointed as CEO of CityPass, the consortium building the Jerusalem Light Rail.

== Personal life ==
He lives in Zikhron Ya'akov.
