= Doron Ben Barak =

Israeli military personnel

- דורון בן ברק
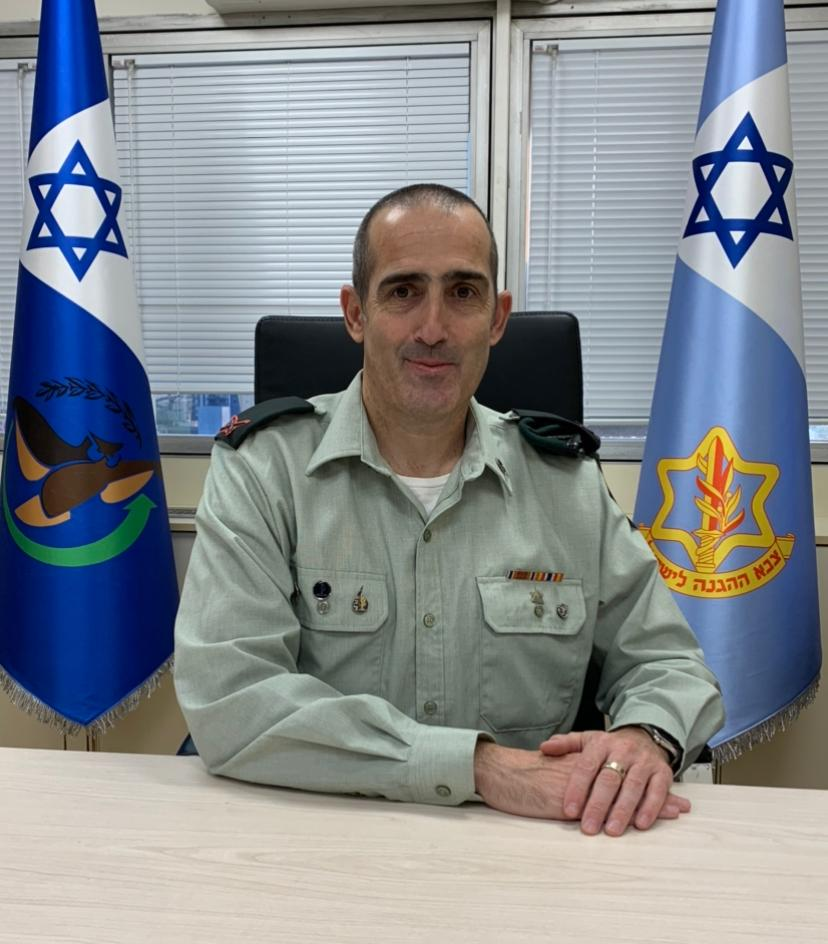
- Brig. Gen. Doron Ben Barak, 2020
- Born: 1 January 1973 (age 53)
- Military career
- Allegiance: Israel
- Rank: Brigadier general
- Units: Military Advocate General; Israeli Military Censor
- Conflicts: Second Intifada; Second Lebanon War; Operation Protective Edge

Doron Ben Barak (Hebrew: דורון בן ברק; born January 1, 1973) is a brigadier general in the Israel Defense Forces who served as the Israeli Chief Military Censor between August 2020 and June 2022.

== Military career ==
After receiving his law degree from the Hebrew University School of Law, Ben Barak joined the Military Advocate General Corps in 1995. He then fulfilled various senior positions in the Military Advocate General Corps, including the Legal Advisor of the Home Front Command, the Chief Attorney for the Deserter Cases, the Deputy Legal Advisor for Judea and Samaria Area, the Chief Attorney of the Central Command and the IAF, the Legal Advisor for Judea and Samaria Area and the Deputy Military Advocate General.

On July 9, 2020, the Minister of Defense Benny Gantz announced his decision to promote Ben Barak to the rank of brigadier general and appoint him to the position of the Chief Military Censor.

On August 13, 2020, Ben Barak was promoted to the rank of brigadier general (tat aluf) and appointed the Israeli Chief Military Censor. Ben Barak fulfilled this position until June 30, 2022.

Ben Barak holds an LLB and LLM degrees from the Hebrew University of Jerusalem. Ben Barak also holds a master's degree in national security studies from Haifa University (as a joint program with the IDF's National Security College).
