= Prisoner X2 =

Reported prisoner in Israel since about 2004

"Prisoner X2" (Hebrew: "האסיר איקס 2" or "X2 האסיר") is a placeholder name of a Mossad agent (described as an "important operative") who has reportedly been secretly imprisoned in Israel since about 2004, after he was convicted of treason (reportedly spying for Iran).

== Reports about Prisoner X2 ==
Details of a "second Prisoner X" being secretly held in Ayalon Prison emerged in 2013, following the exposure of the death of Ben Zygier. Israeli Foreign Minister Avigdor Lieberman told the Foreign Affairs and Defense Committee of the Knesset that the case was "extremely serious" but that the prisoner's rights were being upheld. Israeli lawyer Avigdor Feldman described this case as "a terrible security breach", and "much more grave, sensational, amazing and riveting from Zygier's case." The case was kept secret in Israel, and reports about it were deleted from Israeli news sites.

In May 2018, Richard Silverstein reported in his blog, Tikun Olam, that Prisoner X2, still unidentified, had been released from custody. In his report, Silverstein cited the work of Amir Oren with Walla!.
