= Uri Blau =

Israeli investigative journalist (born 1977)

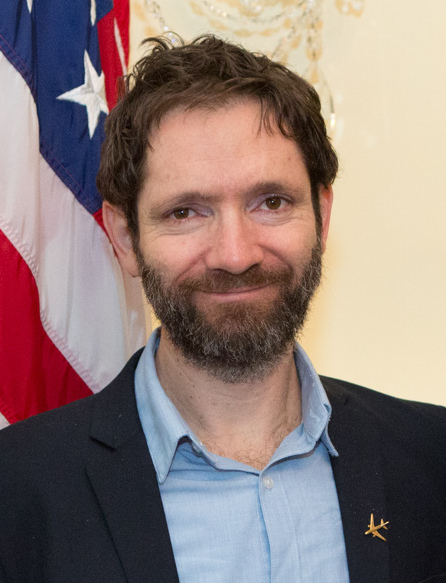
Blau in 2018

Uri Blau (Hebrew: אורי בלאו; born 1977) is an Israeli investigative journalist who writes for Haaretz and other publications. His work focuses on military affairs, corruption and "follow the money" investigations. Blau was convicted of possession of classified IDF documents and sentenced to community service for his role in the Kamm-Blau affair.

== Career ==
Blau attended high school in the Hebrew University Secondary School. Blau began his journalistic career in Kol Ha'ir, a Jerusalem weekly newspaper. He specialized in exposing cases of misconduct by IDF soldiers. Unlike other military correspondents, he did not join the Military Reporters Section and tended to rely on low-ranking enlisted personnel, rather than high-ranking officers.

In 2005 Blau joined the daily Haaretz and published a articles exposing alleged corruption by Ehud Olmert, then leader of Kadima Party, candidate for Prime Minister and later Prime Minister. This exposé has led to a criminal investigation and to Olmert's indictment. Another investigation that led to a major police investigation was about Avigdor Liberman, head of the Israel Beitenu party. Blau revealed that a company owned by Liberman's daughter, who was in her early twenties, received unexplained payment in the millions of dollars Other investigations focused on former Prime Minister Ehud Barak, Former IDF Chief Moshe Ya'alon, the Kabbalah Laam organization and more, such as an article about exploring his roots in Bosnia and Herzegovina, and Israeli connections to a mine in Kosovo. IN 2014 Blau completed a fellowship at the Nieman Foundation for Journalism at Harvard University. He has published articles and investigations in various publications, including AP, ProPublica, Washington Post, Quartz, The Nation, Mashable, Times of Israel and more.

Blau is a member of the International Consortium of Investigative Journalists ICIJ. He is a member of the 2017 Pulitzer Prize winning team for the Panama Papers project, and contributed to other global investigations such as the FinCEN Files. As part of that investigation he co-produced the BBC documentary "The Settlers’ Billionaire Backer" about the role of Roman Abramovich-owned companies in supporting the settler group Ir David Foundation.In 2021 Blau led the Pandora Papers investigations in Israel. Later that year Blau joined OCCRP as the Director of the Global Anti Corruption Consortium (GACC).

In 2022 Blau joined Israel-based nonprofit investigative platform Shomrim as an investigative journalist and Director of Global Investigative Projects.

== Anat Kamm affair ==
=== Background ===
In November 2008, Blau published a story in Haaretz saying that the targeted killing of one of two Islamic Jihad militants killed in Jenin in June 2007 had violated a prior ruling of the Supreme Court of Israel. The ruling had "heavily restricted the circumstances in which they were permissible, effectively saying that killing should not take place if arrest was possible." The report reproduced two IDF memos classified as top secret, indicating that the IDF had ignored the Supreme Court ruling. Publications dealing with military affairs have to be submitted to the Israeli Military Censor; the censor approved the publication of this report. This fact would later be used as argument that no damage was done by the publication.

Speculation began immediately about who Blau's inside source was. It took a year before attention focused on Anat Kamm, a former clerk in the office of a senior IDF commander. She had worked as a journalist before and after her military service.

A week before Operation Cast Lead began (December 2008), Blau submitted to the censor an exposé revealing he had possession of IDF military plans for the Operation. At first, the report was approved for publication. Then, just before it was distributed the censor changed its mind and Haaretz agreed to withdraw the story.

=== Arrest of Anat Kamm ===
In the year, leading up to Kamm's arrest, Blau also published another article regarding Defense Minister Ehud Barak and Chief of Staff Gaby Ashkenazi. The reporter claimed that Barak, on becoming minister, had transferred his private consulting company to his three daughters, violating the regulation allowing such a transfer only if the daughters were actually employed by the company. Furthermore, the company which he gave to his daughters took in nearly $2-million from unknown sources after he entered the government. Blau also claimed that after leaving the army and joining the private sector, Ashkenazi approached Barak about entering into business with him.

In September 2009, the Shin Bet negotiated a written agreement with Blau to hand over 50 classified documents and destroy his work computer. In return the IDF agreed not to pursue or prosecute his source. In December 2009, the Shin Bet secretly arrested Anat Kamm and began interrogating her. Eventually, she was accused of leaking as many as 2,000 documents to the reporter. Blau and Haaretz viewed the soldier's arrest as a violation of their agreement.

Blau, who had left Israel on an Asian backpacking trip that same month of Kamm's arrest, decided to remain abroad pending resolution of the case and eventually ended up in London. The Shin Bet publicly announced that they want to question and perhaps prosecute him. He claimed journalistic privilege and refused to return until he has guarantees about the outcome of his case.

On October 24, 2010 Uri Blau returned to Israel.

Israelis have exhibited mixed feelings about Blau. Some view him as little better than a traitor out to harm the national security. Others support his work. A group of 12 senior Israeli journalists petitioned the government not to prosecute Blau if he returns from London and gives back any outstanding documents he may still possess. After Blau became the first journalist in Israel convicted for possession of classified information, Freedom House dropped Israel to ‘Partially Free’ status in its 2013 “Freedom of the Press Index”.

=== Indictment of Blau ===
In March 2011 the Israeli Ministry of Justice announced its intention to put Blau on trial, subject to the hearing, charged with maintaining classified items without authorization.

In May 2012 it was announced that he will be indicted for "possession of classified IDF documents."

In July 2012, Blau accepted a plea bargain that would see him sentenced to four months' community service but avoid serving any time in prison. He completed four months community service in January 2013, publishing an article about the experience in Haaretz newspaper in August 2013.

=== Civil Lawsuit ===
In April 2013 Kamm sued Haaretz, its publisher and Blau for allegedly operating in a negligent way that eventually led to her exposure as Blau's source. In 2018 Tel Aviv District Court accepted Kamm's lawsuit. Haaretz and Blau appealed to Israel's Supreme Court against that verdict. Their appeal was accepted. In January 2020 Supreme Court dismissed the District Court verdict in its entirety. As a gesture of good will Haaretz has agreed to participate in paying part of Kamm's legal fees, at the amount of $100,000.

== See also ==
- Anat Kamm – Uri Blau affair
- Uri Blau's Personal Website (archived)
