= Eliyahu Winograd =

Israeli judge (1926–2018)

- אליהו וינוגרד
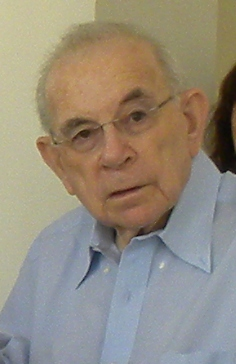

Supreme Court Justice Acting
- In office 1987–1987

Personal details
- Born: 10 December 1926 Tel Aviv
- Died: 13 January 2018 (aged 91)
- Education: Hebrew University of Jerusalem

Eliyahu Winograd (Hebrew: אליהו וינוגרד; 10 December 1926 – 13 January 2018) was an Israeli acting Supreme Court judge and former president of the Tel Aviv District Court. Between September 11, 2006, and April 30, 2007, he chaired the Winograd Commission to investigate the failures experienced by Israel during the 2006 Israel-Lebanon conflict.

== Biography ==
Eliyahu Winograd was born in Tel Aviv in 1926. He attended high school at the Mizrahi Teachers' Training College in Jerusalem, and in 1946 attended the Tel Aviv School of Law and Economics (one of the institutions that would later form Tel Aviv University).

He died on January 13, 2018, at age 91.

== Legal and judicial career ==
From 1948 to 1950, Winograd served in the Israel Defense Forces, and completed his service as head of the Legal Department of the General Staff, with the rank of Lieutenant. He was granted a law license in July 1952, and worked at the Yizhar Harari and Co law firm until 1960. From 1960 to 1963, he served as the Chief Assistant to the Tel Aviv District Attorney. From April 1963 to 1972, he headed his own law firm.

Winograd was appointed as a judge on the Tel Aviv Magistrate's Court in 1972, and a judge on the Tel Aviv District Court in May 1977. In 1983, he received a PhD in Law from the Hebrew University of Jerusalem. In 1987, he served as an acting judge on the Supreme Court of Israel, and from 1989 to 1996 he was President of the Tel Aviv District Court. In 1996, he retired and became active as an arbitrator and Mediator, engaged in municipal law, and chaired numerous public commissions. He was also a partner at Gideon Fisher & Co. law firm.

== Public commissions ==
=== University students tuition fees ===
Chaired the Public Commission to evaluate the tuition fees of university students — the commission recommended that tuition fees be gradually reduced by fifty percent, recommendations which the government has thus far failed to implement.

=== Pension Funds Agreement ===
Chaired the Public Commission dealing with the Pension Funds Agreement — later resigned due to other pending tasks; was thanked by the Finance Minister for his professionalism and contribution for the plan to save the Pension Funds.

=== Air Force cable accident ===
Chaired the Inquiry Commission to investigate the Air Force cable accident and rescue — the commission submitted its findings to then-Defense Minister Yitzhak Mordechai

=== Rank of Aluf Yitzhak Mordechai ===
Chaired of the Public Commission dealing with the military rank of Aluf (ret.) Yitzhak Mordechai — the commission decided that Mordechai will retain his rank despite having been convicted of sexual misconduct.

=== Status of Ron Arad ===
Chaired the Public Commission formed by the IDF in June 2002 to examine the chain of events and available information on captured IDF soldier Ron Arad — the commission concluded that there is no reason to change the assumption that Arad remains alive.

=== Ethiopian blood donations ===
Deputy chaired the Commission to examine blood donations among the Ethiopian community — the commission instructed Magen David Adom to cease destroying the blood donations of Ethiopian Jews.

=== Authority of Military Censor ===
Chaired the Inspection Probe for reviewing the authority of the Military Censor — report yet to be published.

=== Winograd Commission (2006) ===
Winograd chaired the Winograd Commission to investigate the 2006 Lebanon War..

The partial report by the commission probing the Second Lebanon War was issued Monday, April 30, 2007. The report accused Prime Minister Ehud Olmert of "severe failure" in exercising judgment, responsibility and caution during the outset of the war. The report says Olmert acted hastily in leading the country to war in July 2006, without having a comprehensive plan. The prime minister, the report said, "bears supreme and comprehensive responsibility for the decisions of 'his' government and the operations of the army."

== See also ==
- Judiciary of Israel
