= Yehezkel Dror =

Austrian-born Israeli political scientist (1928–2026)

- יחזקאל דרור
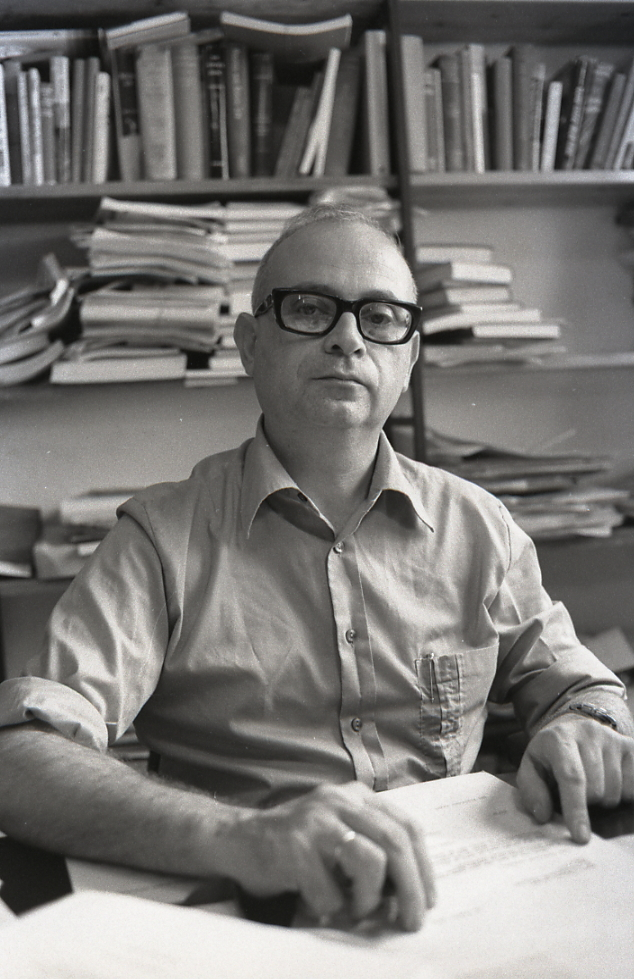
- Dror in 1966
- Born: 12 August 1928; Vienna, Austria
- Died: 1 January 2026 (aged 97)
- Education: Hebrew University, Harvard University
- Known for: Public Policy making
- Awards: Rosolio Award (1965), Israel Prize (2005)
- Scientific career
- Fields: Political Science, Policy Planning, Strategic Issues
- Workplaces: Hebrew University, Jerusalem

Yehezkel Dror (Hebrew: יחזקאל דרור; 12 August 1928 – 1 January 2026) was an Austrian-born Israeli political scientist who was professor emeritus of political science at Hebrew University, Jerusalem.

== Background ==
Arthur Yehezkel Dror was born in Vienna, Austria in 1928. He immigrated to Mandate Palestine with his family in 1938. He graduated from the Hebrew Reali School in Haifa in 1946.

Dror held a B.A. and Magister Juris from the Hebrew University, and LLM and SJD (doctor of juridical sciences) qualifications from Harvard University.

In 1954, Dror married Rachel Elboim-Dror, an educational researcher, with whom he had three children: Asael, Otniel and Itiel.

Dror died on 1 January 2026, at the age of 97.

== Academic career ==
Dror was a faculty member of the Hebrew University's Department of Political Science from 1957 until his retirement, and was also head of its Public Administration division from 1964. He is a pioneering author in the fields of management, policy science, public administration, capacities to govern, leadership and security issues.

Colleague David Levi-Faur considers him to be "one of the most influential scholars in the founding generation of public administration in the world. He is an important voice in connection with promoting planning, prior deployment and prediction in public policy. [...] To a large degree, the world is moving against Dror, which is a pity."

In 1968, Dror joined the RAND Corporation as a senior staff member. The RAND think tank was instrumental in planning America's strategy in the Cold War. While at RAND, Dror developed the concept and introduced the term of "crazy states", arguably his most widely known contribution to strategic thought. In his definition, as laid out in his 1971 book "Crazy States", such a state or organization is characterized by fanaticism, and the fact that they follow their goals while ignoring the common profit-and-loss considerations.

== Public affairs ==
Dror served as a senior consultant on policy-making and planning for the Israeli government, and founded the Jewish People Policy Planning Institute (JPPI). He engaged in international consultantship, serving inter alia from 1968 to 1970 as a senior staff member at the American Rand Corporation. He served on the Israeli Government's Winograd Commission, established to investigate Israel's actions in the 2006 Lebanon War. Dror had recommended the establishment of a strong National Security Council, but in his opinion, he was only given the power to effectively sustain the concept once he became part of the Winograd Commission, which led to the partial implementation of his idea. In a mid-2020 interview, he advanced the concept of a similar body being created for overseeing domestic policy.

== Published works ==
- Public Policymaking Reexamined, Chandler (1968), Transaction Publishers (1983) and Routledge (2017), "probably the most important book on public policy making published in this century" (1970 review)
- Design for Policy Sciences, American Elsevier Publishing Company, 1971
- Crazy States: A Counterconventional Strategic Problem, Heath Lexington Books, 1971
- Policymaking under Adversity, Transaction Books, 1986
- The Capacity to Govern: A Report to the Club of Rome, Routledge, 2001
- Foreword to Public Policy in Israel: Perspectives and Practices, Dani Korn (ed.), Lexington Books, 2005
- Israeli Statecraft: National Security Challenges and Responses, Routledge, BESA Studies in International Security, 2011. "[A] fundamental treatise for public policy studies....a modern classic of continuing importance..."
- Avant-Garde Politician : Leaders for a New Epoch, Westphalia Press, 2014
- For Rulers : Priming Political Leaders for Saving Humanity from Itself, Westphalia Press, 2017
- Steering Human Evolution: Eighteen Theses on Homo Sapiens Metamorphosis, Routledge, 2020

== Awards and recognition ==
- In 1965, Dror received the Rosolio Award, the Israeli annual Civil Service Commission award for contributions to the study and practice of public administration, named after Civil Service Commissioner David (Werner) Rosolio
- In 2005, he was awarded the Israel Prize, for management.

== See also ==
- List of Israel Prize recipients
