= Shamai Leibowitz =

American lawyer and blogger

Shamai Kedem Leibowitz, also known as Samuel Shamai Leibowitz, is an American lawyer and blogger who was convicted of leaking classified FBI information to another blogger.

Leibowitz pleaded guilty on December 17, 2009, to knowingly and willfully disclosing five Secret level FBI documents in April 2009, to a blogger, who then published information derived from those documents on the blog. He was sentenced under the Espionage Act on May 24, 2010, to 20 months in prison.

According to Leibowitz:

During the course of my work, I came across wrongdoings that led me to conclude this is an abuse of power and a violation of the law. I reported these violations to my superiors at the FBI who did nothing about them. Thereafter, to my great regret, I disclosed the violations to a member of the media.

The New York Times reported that Leibowitz leaked the documents to blogger Richard Silverstein, who writes a blog called Tikun Olam, which gives a left-wing perspective on Israel and Israeli-American relations. Silverstein told the New York Times that the documents were transcripts of F.B.I. wiretaps of the Israeli Embassy in Washington, and that Leibowitz leaked them because of concerns about Israel's aggressive efforts to influence Congress and public opinion, and fears that Israel might strike nuclear facilities in Iran.

Leibowitz denied the New York Times report and wrote that Silverstein "made up a story". On his blog, he wrote:

Contrary to what blogger Richard Silverstein told the NYT, my job never entailed listening to wiretaps of embassies, and that whole story was manufactured by Silverstein to promote his blog and his anti-Israel agenda... Naturally, I cannot talk about my work at the FBI, but I can say that what really troubled me was the FBI's illegal practices, very similar to what Edward Snowden has reported about the NSA.

Leibowitz's grandfather was Israeli intellectual Yeshayahu Leibowitz.

== Publications ==
- Leibowitz, Shamai. "Blowback from the White House's vindictive war on whistleblowers." The Guardian. July 5, 2013.
