= Hebrew University Secondary School =

Prestigious high school in Jerusalem

Coordinates: 31°46′50″N 35°11′50″E

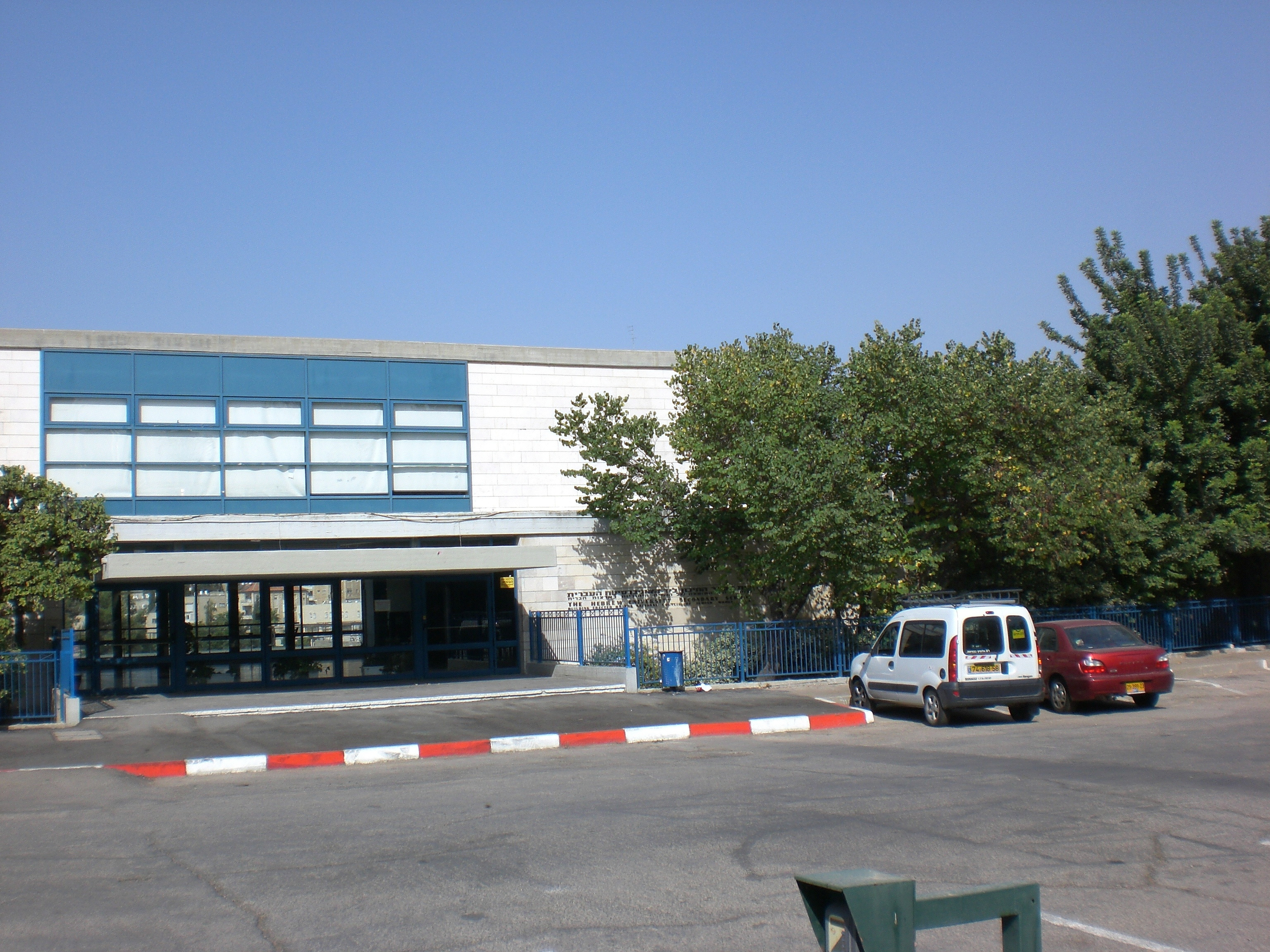
Entrance to Hebrew University High School

School logo

Hebrew University High School (Hebrew: התיכון ליד האוניברסיטה), commonly known as Leyada (lit. 'next to'), is a semi-private high school in Jerusalem, established in 1935 by the Hebrew University of Jerusalem. The school is located next to the Givat Ram campus of the Hebrew University. It is considered one of the country's most prestigious and selective institutions of secondary education.

== History ==
Founded in 1935 as Beit-Hakerem High School, it soon established a unique methodology and syllabus, carefully screening applicants through psychometric entrance exams. Over the years, the school has carried out several integration projects initially founded by Professor Karl Frankenstein (Hebrew: קרל פרנקנשטיין; born 16 February 1905, died 1990), a ground-breaking Israeli professor in special education and pedagogy. Over the years, these projects have changed names and structure and have attempted to diminish the school's social elitist stereotype. While many students come from middle- and upper-class families, there is a broad diversity of students at the school originating from a range of backgrounds, including Jewish, Arab, students from migrant families and more.

== Academics ==
Leyada is considered to be a prestigious high schools. The school is in the process of reform and restructuring. Dr. Gilead Amir has completed his role as Principal of the six-year programme in mid-2020, with Erez Hacker becoming Principal in mid 2020, Dr. Rivka Berger was Pedagogical Director and Vice Principal. Rena Gampel was coordinator of the high school.

The school has a five-day week schedule (Sunday through Thursday), keeping facilities open on Fridays for special classes, self-study and projects. In addition to the 40+ classrooms upgraded with projectors, wi-fi and whiteboards, facilities include two 200 seat lecture halls, fully equipped physics and chemistry laboratories, a library, state-of-the-art art center, a chamber-music auditorium, a 600-seat theater, a modern professional sports center and a regulation-size basketball court.

The recent principal was Dr. Gilead Amir (class of 1970), who joined faculty in 1977 as a math teacher, and took the top position in 2003 from 35-year veteran Hana Levitte. Among the school's board of directors is Israeli Labor Party member Orna Angel, a 1980 Leyada graduate and former CEO of the Tel Aviv Port Authority.

== Notable alumni ==
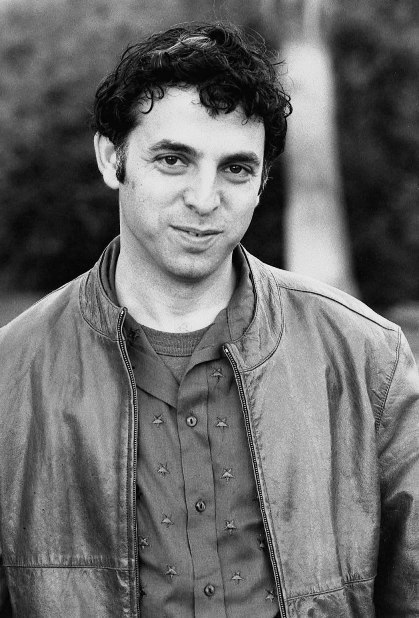
Etgar Keret

The school's alumni include one Israeli president, one Israeli prime minister, five Israel Supreme Court judges, and four Israeli generals. They also include two Nobel Prize winners, one Fields Medal winner, one Godel Prize winner, 20 Israel Prize winners and many other notable scientists, academics, entrepreneurs, politicians, journalists and writers.

A partial list includes:

- Yitzhak Navon (class of 1939) – fifth President of Israel
- Yohai Ben-Nun (1942) – sixth commander of the Israeli Sea Corps
- Daniel Kahneman (1951) – awarded the 2002 Nobel Prize in Economics
- Aharon Barak (1954) – Professor of Law at the Hebrew University of Jerusalem and recurring guest Professor at Yale Law School, Chief Justice of the Supreme Court of Israel from 1995 to 2006
- Yehoram Gaon (1956) – singer and actor
- Ruth Kark (1958) - Professor of Geography, Jerusalem Honor (Yakirat Yersushalyim), Herzl Prize.
- David Gross (1959) – awarded the 2004 Nobel Prize in Physics
- Tom Segev (1963) – journalist and historian
- Meir Shalev (1966) – writer
- David Grossman (1972) – author of fiction, nonfiction, and youth and children's literature
- Ido Nehoshtan (1975) – sixteenth commander of the Israeli Air Force
- Orit Strook (1979) – member of the Knesset for The Jewish Home party and a settler leader
- Yoav Freund (1979) - Computer scientist. Winner of the 2003 Gödel Prize.
- Ilana Schlesinger (1980) - Chair of Neurology at the Technion-Israel Institute of Technology
- Etgar Keret (1985) – writer. The title of one of his books, Kneler's Summer Camp, is a reference to the school principal at his time, Dr. Shmuel Kneler.
- Gil Shwed (1986) – founder of Checkpoint
- Elon Lindenstrauss (1988) – awarded the 2010 Fields Medal in Mathematics
- Aharon Razel (אהרן רזאל) – Israeli musician exploring topics such as living Orthodox Judaism
- Anat Kamm (2004) – A journalist who has been convicted of providing confidential information without authorization, as part of the Anat Kamm-Uri Blau affair. Blau is another graduate of the school.
- Ofer Berkovitch (1983) - Deputy Mayor of Jerusalem and head of the Jerusalem Hitorerut political party.
- Eden Alene (2018) - Israel representative to Eurovision Song Contest 2021

The prime minister of Israel, Benjamin Netanyahu, has studied in the school, but did not graduate from it, because of his family's relocation to the United States.

== Notable faculty ==
- Yeshayahu Leibowitz (1903–94), an Israeli public intellectual, professor to Biochemistry, Organic chemistry and Neurophysiology at the Hebrew University of Jerusalem and a polymath known for his outspoken opinions on Judaism, ethics, religion and politics.
- Batya Gur (1947-2005) Israeli writer.
