= Winograd Commission =

Israeli commission of inquiry

The Winograd Commission (Hebrew: ועדת וינוגרד; the commission's official name is הוועדה לבדיקת ארועי המערכה בלבנון 2006 – "The commission of inquiry into the events of military engagement in Lebanon 2006") is an Israeli government-appointed commission of inquiry, chaired by retired judge Eliyahu Winograd, which investigated and drew lessons from the 2006 Lebanon War (or the Second Lebanon War as it is known in Israel). The committee had its first plenary session on 18 September 2006 and began summoning and hearing testimonies from witnesses on 2 November of that year. On 30 April 2007 the Commission released its preliminary report, harshly criticizing key decision-makers. At the same time, it has been praised as testimony to the fortitude of Israel's democracy and ability to self-criticize, impressing even Hezbollah leader Hassan Nasrallah. The final Winograd Commission report was announced in Binyanei HaUma in Jerusalem on 30 January 2008.

== Background ==
The Israeli public, press, and parliament generally supported the war against Hezbollah but questioned how it was conducted.

Israelis have been debating the war since its conclusion. Critics note that the kidnapped soldiers were not rescued and that Hezbollah is rearming and has been strengthened politically. The government claims success in forcing Hezbollah from the border, and in pressuring the Lebanese government, aided by international forces, to assert itself in south Lebanon. Israeli officials took Hezbollah leader Hassan Nasrallah's admission that he would not have authorized 12 July action if he had known how strongly Israel would react as confirmation that the group had been weakened and that Israel's deterrence had been strengthened.

During the war the Israeli government provided insufficient material support, including necessities, to the Home Front population of about one million people in northern Israel who were instructed to remain in shelters for much of the war's duration. Government support networks were not activated or were inadequately run. Much of the burden to care for vulnerable populations was left to individual volunteers and charities. The conditions of, and access to, shelters were often substandard and government assistance to northern Israelis in transportation and accommodations in central and southern Israel was highly lacking. Government inaction caused the weakest segments of Israeli society in affected areas to suffer the worst of the day-to-day privations.

On the military front there were tactical, operative and logistic failures, including the flow of intelligence. Many Israeli commanders and troops were ill-prepared and ill-trained to meet the combat conditions, in particular, with respect to Hezbollah's use of portable antitank weapons, such as the 9К115-2 Metis-M. Unlike in Gaza and the West Bank, troops inside armor, or taking shelter in houses, became highly vulnerable to these weapons, which led to the majority of Israeli military casualties in the war. As well, with the mobilization of reserve divisions, a host of logistical failures, such as ordnance and food shortages, began affecting reserve soldiers.

A key strategic question relates to the controversial decision to launch full-scale warfare in response to the abduction of two individual soldiers and killing of eight soldiers in the process.

After the war, increasing public criticism and protest over these issues was placed on Israeli Prime Minister Ehud Olmert, especially to have him call for the establishment of a Supreme Court-appointed state commission of inquiry to look at all levels of government and the military (including the prime minister and chief of staff).

For a time it was unclear which of the three areas—cabinet, military, and civilian homefront—would be investigated by whom, and how. On 28 August, Olmert announced the creation of a governmental inspection probe led by former director of Mossad Nahum Admoni; it became the prototype for the Winograd Commission. A military inspection probe, led by former Chief of Staff, Amnon Lipkin-Shahak which on 22 August ceased work after five days of operations due to increasing public dissatisfaction and calls for a state commission, was also set to be renewed. Olmert hinted that the State Comptroller would examine the civilian homefront, to the public consternation of the latter. In response to these growing criticisms, Olmert chose to replace Admoni with retired judge Eliyahu Winograd as chair of the governmental inspection probe (with Olmert thereby responding to calls that any leading commission or probe needs to be headed by a retired judge); the probe itself, turned into a commission with a wider mandate, amounting to near-equal authority to a state commission.

== Authority and operation ==
The commission has the same mandate as a state commission, except that its members were not appointed by the Supreme Court and that its recommendations, especially with respect to resignations, may not possess the same legal weight. During its first week, the commission somewhat controversially engaged in preliminary meetings with top decision makers (including Olmert) who were later to be summoned as witnesses. For the next several weeks, the commission studied material and worked to decide on the direction of its investigation. On 2 November, it began hearing testimonies from witnesses, beginning with the head of the Israel National Emergency Economic Authority, Brigadier-General (res.) Arnon Ben-Ami, who was asked why the Authority failed to be activated during the war despite repeated calls to do so. On 4 November, it met in a closed session to hear testimonies by outgoing head of the Directorate of Military Intelligence Amos Yadlin. On 7 November, the commission heard testimonies from Vice Prime Minister Shimon Peres and from Director-general of the Ministry of Defense Gabi Ashkenazi.

On 6 February 2007, the Israeli High Court of Justice ruled against Meretz MK Zehava Galon's petition. She had petitioned the court to force the commission to hold public meetings and publish minutes, even before the preliminary report was to be published. The ruling was given after the commission had completed hearing testimonies behind closed doors. The High Court decided that "the Winograd Commission had a duty to permit exposure of the content of its deliberations, and the evidence presented to the commission, as much as possible, without harming the security or other national interests of the first degree." As a result of the ruling the commission put up a website on 23 March 2007, where the testimonies are to be published (as of now only testimonies by only three witnesses are available: Shimon Peres, Major-General (Res.) Amos Malka, and Brigadier-General (Res.) Arnon Ben Ami). Also available on the website is other information regarding the commission's activity put out by the commission.

== Preliminary report ==
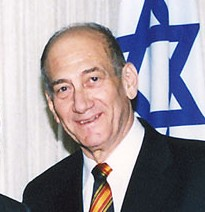
Ehud Olmert

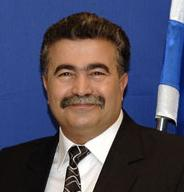
Amir Peretz

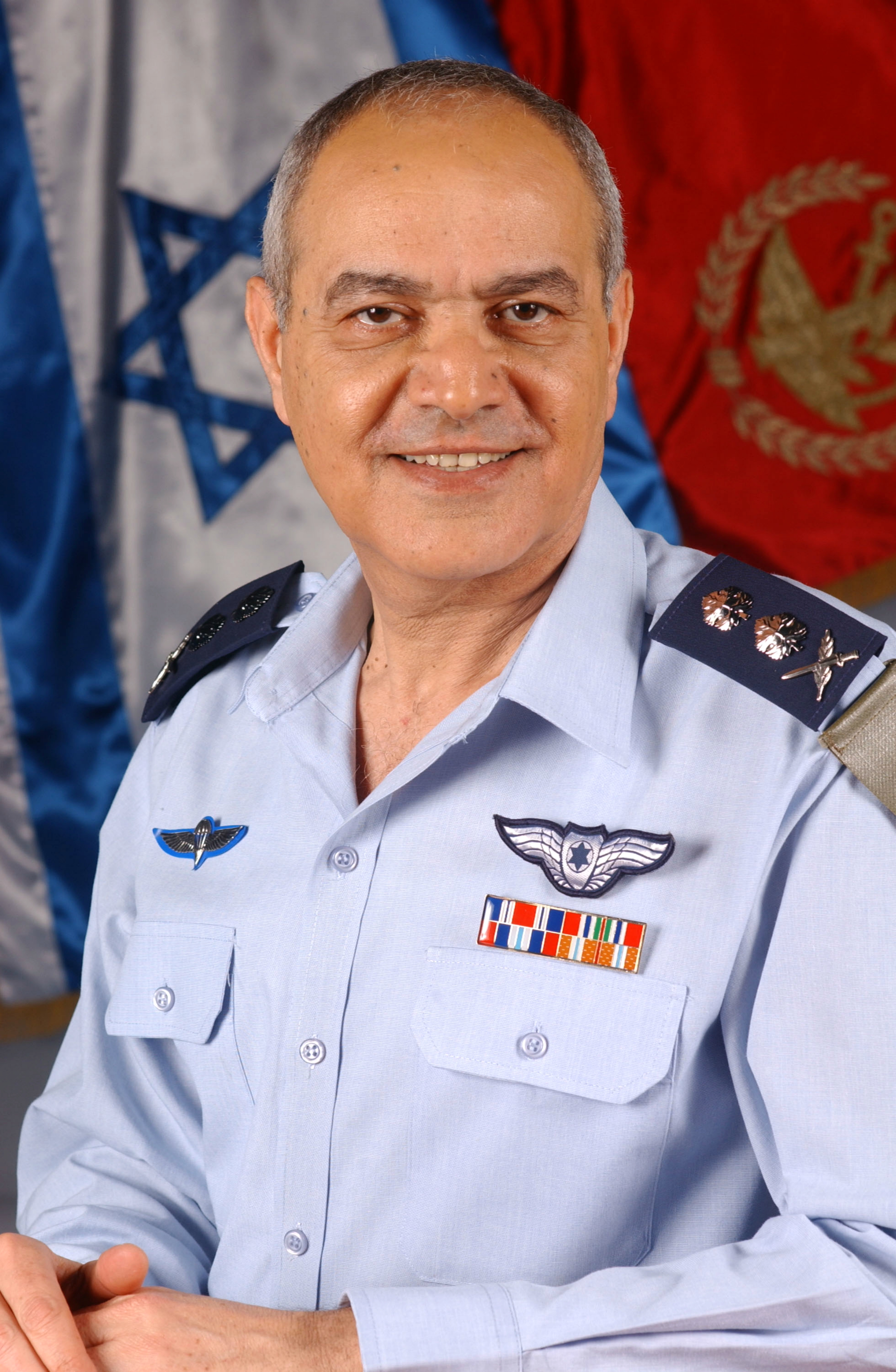
Dan Halutz

On 13 March 2007, the commission announced it would publish a preliminary report in the second half of April, which included personal recommendations regarding Prime Minister Ehud Olmert, then Minister of Defense Amir Peretz, and the IDF Chief of Staff during the war, Dan Halutz.

On 28 April 2007, Israel's Channel Ten nightly news edition leaked information from the preliminary report. The leaked copy reportedly criticized Olmert for having no "organized plan" in launching the war and called his move "misguided and rash judgment". The commission also accused Olmert, who lacks significant military experience, of not consulting the military leadership enough, and authorizing operations without input from other sources. It further criticized Olmert for failing to foresee the possible outcomes of the war. On Israeli Channel 2's news, the report was quoted as saying that Olmert had "failed" in his duty during the war. Nevertheless, according to Channel Ten, the report did not go so far as to call for the Prime Minister's dismissal.

Channel 2 also reported that the preliminary report also criticizes Peretz and Halutz, saying the Minister of Defense had failed, and that Halutz possessed "over-charisma", preventing the government from asking him to present alternatives to his plans for the war.

The report, covering the years leading up to the war (2000–2006) as well as the first few days of the war (12–17 July), was released on 30 April 2007, and contained serious criticisms of Prime Minister Olmert, Defence Minister Amir Peretz and Chief of Staff Dan Halutz.

Nevertheless, Peretz has tried to spin the report's findings in his favor, saying the report shows he "displayed understanding that more experienced people had not shown and that he need not resign immediately," despite the fact that the report quite clearly found that Peretz's "serving as Minister of Defense during the war impaired Israel's ability to respond well to its challenges."

While Halutz resigned, Olmert and Peretz did not. Many public figures called upon Olmert and Peretz to resign. Notable among them was then-Foreign Minister Tzipi Livni. Olmert refused to resign claiming Israel needed stability at that stage, and that new elections would be disruptive. Also in criticism of Olmert, Avigdor Yitzhaki, head of the Kadima faction and coalition chairman resigned in light of Olmert's refusal to step down.

Livni's post was the topic of one of the only positive comments in the report. The commission noted that "from the first few days of the war it prepared the diplomatic ground that led to Security Council Resolution 1701 that brought a cease-fire."

On 3 May 2007, three days after the release of the preliminary report, the Knesset held an extraordinary session to debate the report's findings. Opposition leader Benjamin Netanyahu called for Olmert to resign, but Kadima MPs supported the prime minister and a vote of no-confidence was not held. Later that day, tens of thousands of protesters gathered at Rabin Square in Tel Aviv, calling on Olmert and his government to resign. On 4 May, an IBA poll showed that nearly 80 percent favour Olmert's resignation.

== Final report ==
The Final Report of the Commission to Investigate the Lebanon Campaign in 2006 (the Winograd Committee) was submitted on 30 January 2008 to the then Prime Minister, Ehud Olmert, and to the Minister of Defense, Ehud Barak. A press release covered some of the major conclusions. The committee stood behind everything they had said in the Interim Report.

The report categorised the 2nd Lebanon war as a serious missed opportunity. The war had ended without clear military victory, a much smaller para-military organization successfully resisted against a much larger force which had complete air superiority among other technological advantages. Lebanese rockets aimed at Israel's civilian population continued throughout the war which Israel could not effectively stop. Life in the affected regions of Israel was seriously disrupted, with many civilians either leaving their homes temporarily or spending time in shelters. When Israel initiated a large scale ground offensive the offensive did not result in military gains and was not completed.

Some of the troubling findings revealed that there were serious failings and shortcomings in the decision-making processes at both the political and military levels, in preparedness, decision-making and performance in the IDF, particularly the army, in strategic thinking and planning, in both the political and the military echelons, and in the defence of the civilian population and in coping with rockets.

The decision to react immediately to the kidnapping limited Israel's range of options to only two, a stand-off war or an invasion. Israel went to war before it had decided which option to use and military and political echelons failed to have a serious discussion of the options or decide between them. Even so, until the first week of August, Israel was unprepared to launch a large-scale ground operation.

As a result, Israel was 'dragged' into a ground operation too late. Despite the fact that it was a limited war initiated by Israel itself, Israel did not use its military force well and effectively. Israel did not gain a political achievement because of military successes.

In the end, the IDF failed to provide an effective military response to the challenges posed. This conclusion must not take away the great willingness of the soldiers, especially reserve soldiers, to serve and fight in the war. There were many instances of heroism, courage, self-sacrifice and devotion of many commanders and soldiers. The air force in particular was superb, however they alone could not prove decisive as the air force was necessarily limited, due to the weaknesses in the overall performance of the IDF.

The war had significant diplomatic achievements. UNSC Resolution 1701, and the fact it was adopted unanimously, was an achievement for Israel, despite an absence of preparatory staff work and discussions. The staff work done in the Ministry of Foreign Affairs concerning the adoption of a favorable resolution in the Security Council was, in the main, quick, systematic and efficient.

=== Lack of Military Enrolment ===
The report also found that Israel also suffered from a military enrolment problem. 25% of men didn't show up to enlist, and 17.5% left before their mandatory military service period ended. In addition, 42% of military-age women didn't enlist, either.

This led to the creation of legislation which would treat such people as second-class citizens, depriving them of state benefits.

== Members ==
Commission members as of 18 September 2006, include:

- Chair: Justice (ret.) Eliyahu Winograd
- Law Professor Ruth Gavison
- Political Science Professor Yehezkel Dror
- Aluf (ret.) Menachem Einan
- Aluf (ret.) Chaim Nadel

== Criticism ==
Dutch-Israeli military historian and author Martin van Creveld criticized some of Winograd's findings. Israel's war against Hezbollah was indeed "marked by a long series of failures" but he criticized the Winograd Commission for its failure to take into account the substantial achievements of the war. He argued that Hezbollah "had the fight knocked out of it," lost hundreds of its members and that the organization was "thrown out of South Lebanon," replaced by "a fairly robust United Nations peacekeeping force." He also stressed that as a result of the war, Israel was experiencing a level of calm on the Lebanon border not seen in over four decades.
