= Israeli Military Censor =

Israeli military unit

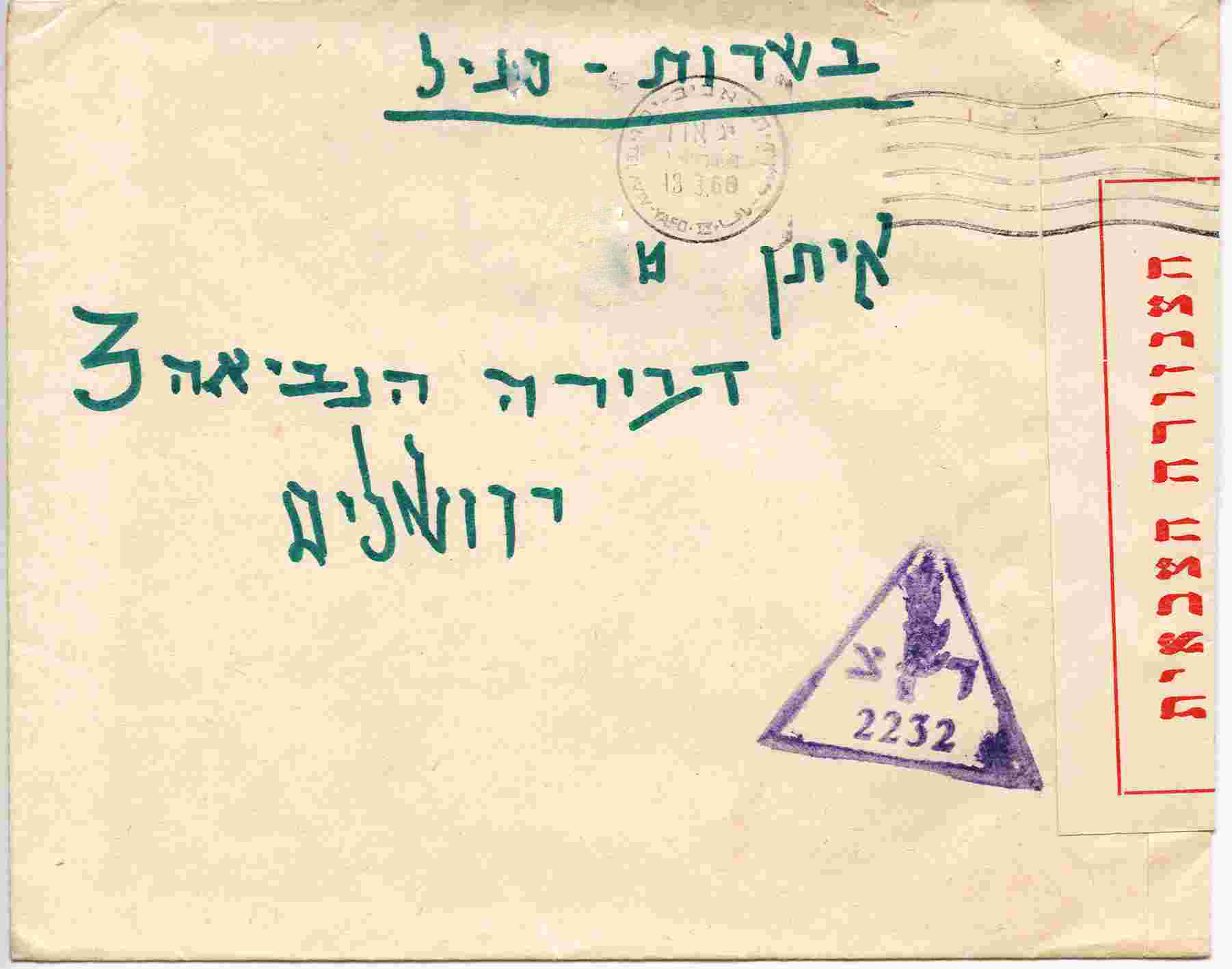
1968 censored letter from an Israeli soldier. The triangular frank depicts Israel Defense Forces logo (Sword wrapped by an olive branch) and denotes sender's military unit postal identification. Red inscription on sticker at right denotes the letter was inspected by the Israeli Military Censor.

The Israeli Military Censor (Hebrew: הצנזורה הצבאית) is a unit in the IDF Directorate of Military Intelligence tasked with carrying out preventive censorship inside the State of Israel regarding the publication of information that might affect the security of Israel. The body is headed by the Israeli Chief Censor, a military official is appointed by Israel's Minister of Defense, who bestows upon the Chief Censor the authority to suppress information he deems compromising from being made public in the media. On average, 2240 press articles in Israel are censored by the Israeli Military Censor each year, approximately 240 of which in full, and around 2000 partially.

== Censorship Agreement ==
In 1966, the Censorship Agreement was signed between media representatives and the IDF. The media agreed to abide by the orders of the Military Censor, while the IDF agreed not to misuse its role:

- The purpose of the censorship is to prevent the publication of security information which could benefit the enemy or harm the State.
- There will be no censorship on political issues, on expressions of opinion or assessments unless they hint on classified information.
- The Military Censor will inform the media the issues that demand its approval. The list is subject to change but always includes two overarching issues: the security of the state and the immigration of Jews from nations hostile to Israel.

== Parliamentary and judicial oversight ==
During the 1990s, the Knesset's Foreign Affairs and Defense Committee appointed a subcommittee, chaired by Yossi Sarid, to examine the existence and role of the Military Censor. The subcommittee recommended to keep the Censorship Agreement in place but to amend it:

- Extend the terms of the Agreement to all media outlets in Israel, not only media outlets with representatives in the Editorial Committee.
- A simple appeal of a decision rendered by the "Censorship Committee" will not be heard by the Chief of Staff but by a Supreme Court Judge, or a retired judge with an Arbitrator status in the arbitration law.
- The terms of the Censorship Agreement will also be extended to foreign journalists working in Israel
- A newspaper will be allowed to cite anything published in another newspaper unless the Military Censor decides the material poses "imminent and immediate danger" in the spirit of the terms established by the Supreme Court.
- The Military Censor and the Interior Minister are to be prohibited from shutting down a newspaper that is not part of the Agreement without giving it the opportunity to appeal the decision in the courts.

The former president of the Supreme Court, Aharon Barak, ruled that when in direct conflict, the right to live supersedes the right to expression:

Precisely because of the existential nature of the security issues, it is important that the public be aware of the host of problems, in a manner where it is able to arrive at wise decisions on the fundamental problems which trouble it. Precisely because the repercussions that decisions of a security nature have on the life of nation, it is suitable to open the door to openly exchanging of views on security issues.

In March 2005, it became public that the Ministry of Defense-appointed Winograd Commission for reviewing the authority of the Military Censor (chaired by former judge, Eliyahu Winograd), whose members were selected by the then-Chief Censor Colonel Miri Regev, would recommend expanding the authority of the Military Censor, by proposing legislation to repeal the 1989 Supreme Court ruling, which limited the scope its authority on legitimate news reporting. Since then, opposition for the move (initiated by commission member, professor Asa Kasher) was expressed by professor Gabriela Shalev, another commission member.

== Chief Censor ==
The unit is commanded by the Chief Censor, an officer directly appointed by the Defense Minister. It is an entirely independent position in the IDF, which is neither subordinate to the Defense Minister, nor the Chief of Staff, Aman Director, or any one else on the chain of command or from the political echelon, and is only subject to parliamentary and judicial oversight. As of April 2025, the Chief Censor was Colonel Netanel Kula.

== Notable cases ==
- 1954 – Lavon Affair. Censor circumvented by use of code words.
- 1977 – The Rabin Memoirs. Yitzak Rabin's account of David Ben-Gurion's 1948 instructions to expel the Arab populations of Ramla and Lydda removed from English edition.
- 1982 – Tyre HQ attack.
- 1984 – Kav 300 affair. Picture published in The New York Times.
- 1986 – Trial of Mordechai Vanunu.
- 1988 – Assassination of Abu Jihad. Two American reporters have their accreditations removed for failing to submit stories for clearance.
- 1997 – Attempted assassination of Khalid Mashal.
- 2002 – Operation Defensive Shield. 2 April: CNN and NBC threatened with legal action for broadcasting from Ramallah.
- 2008–2009 – Gaza War (2008–2009).
- 2014 – 2014 Israel–Gaza conflict
- 2021 – After Haaretz revealed that the popular news channel Abu Ali Express was run by Gilad Cohen, and that he was an employee of the Israel Defense Forces in the field of psychological warfare tool, the Israeli Military Censor prohibited the Israeli press from publishing Cohen's name.
- 2022 – After over two decades of the Israel Defense Forces using drone warfare, in July 2022 a standing censorship order that prevented the Israeli press from reporting on Israeli military drones was finally lifted.
- 2023–present – Gaza war.

== See also ==
- Censorship in Israel
- Nossek, Hillel, and Yehiel Limor. "The Israeli Paradox: The Military Censorship as a Protector of the Freedom of the Press." In Government Secrecy, edited by Susan Maret (pp. 103-130). Emerald Group Publishing Limited, 2011.
