= Ilana Schlesinger =

Israeli neurology scientist

- אילנה שלזינגר
- Born: 25 September 1962 (age 64); Jerusalem
- Education: Hebrew University of Jerusalem, University of Massachusetts
- Known for: Focused Ultrasound
- Scientific career
- Fields: Neurology

Ilana Schlesinger (born September 25, 1962) is an Israeli neurologist specializing in movement disorders and Parkinson's disease. She is the Chair of Neurology at the Technion-Israel Institute of Technology, and Director of the Movement Disorders Institute at Rambam Health Care Campus, as well as Chair of Neurology, Rappaport Faculty of Medicine, Technion. In collaboration with the Department of Neurosurgery, she founded the Center for MRI Guided Focused Ultrasound Treatment of Movement Disorders. Along with her team, she was the first to publish a case series describing the use of this technology for symptomatic treatment of tremor dominant Parkinson’s disease. Schlesinger is the representative of the Association of Neurologists in the Parkinson's Lobby to the Knesset.

== Career ==
Schlesinger received her MD in 1989 from the School of Medicine at the Hebrew University in Jerusalem, and did her clinical training in neurology at the Hadassah Medical Center and at Meir Hospital in Kfar-Saba. Between 1998 and 2001, she completed a specialization in movement disorders and Parkinson's disease at the UMass Chan Medical School in Massachusetts.

In 2015, Schlesinger published the successful results of using MRI guided focused ultrasound (MRgFUS) for thalamotomy to alleviate tremor in Parkinson’s disease, a far less invasive method than traditional surgical thalamotomy. In 2023, her results were published in the New England Journal of Medicine. Since 2013, Schlesinger has been heading the Movement Disorders Institute at the Rambam Health Care Campus in Haifa, where she founded a center for Focused Ultrasound Treatment of Movement Disorders.

Schlesinger is Chair of Neurology and Clinical Associate Professor at the Technion – Israel Institute of Technology.
