= Tikun Olam (blog) =

Seattle-based political blog that reports on the Arab–Israeli conflict

Tikun Olam (Hebrew: תיקון עולם, romanized: tikkun olam, lit. 'repairing the world') is a Seattle-based political blog that regularly reports on Israeli security matters. The blog was created in 2003 by Richard Silverstein and covers the Arab–Israeli conflict. Silverstein describes it as a "liberal Jewish blog" that "focuses on exposing the excesses of the Israeli national security state".

== Background ==
=== Richard Silverstein ===
Richard Silverstein, the blog's creator, is a full-time blogger who describes himself as a "progressive (critical) Zionist" who supports an "Israeli withdrawal to pre-67 borders and an internationally guaranteed peace agreement with the Palestinians". He also created the now-defunct Israel Palestine Forum, a progressive forum dedicated to discussing the Israeli-Palestinian conflict. He often interviews on Iranian Press TV and has contributed essays to Al Jazeera, The Huffington Post, The Guardian, Haaretz, The Jewish Daily Forward, the Los Angeles Times, Tikkun, Truthout, The American Conservative, Middle East Eye and Al-Araby Al-Jadeed.

Silverstein was born in New York City in 1952, the son of a schoolteacher. Aspiring to be a Hebrew professor, he attended the Jewish Theological Seminary, earning a bachelor's degree in Hebrew literature. He also earned a BA in comparative literature from Columbia University, and studied Hebrew literature at UCLA, earning an MA. He spent an undergraduate and graduate year in Israel, studying Hebrew literature at the Hebrew University of Jerusalem. Silverstein pursued but never completed a PhD. He worked as a fundraiser for Jewish causes, and in 1997, began working as a fundraiser for the University of Washington. He quit his job in 2003, the year his first child was born, and began blogging. He lives in Seattle with his wife, a lawyer, and their three children. Silverstein lived in Israel for two years, studying at the Hebrew University of Jerusalem.

Silverstein has used controversial, racially derogatory language; he referred insultingly to Chloé Valdary, an African-American woman who supports Israel, on his Facebook page: "They finally did it: found a Negro Zionist: Uncle Tom is dancing for joy!"

=== Early days ===
At its inception in 2003, the blog did not focus exclusively on Israel; it included articles about the Seattle restaurant scene, world music, and Silverstein's native Hudson Valley. During Israel's 2006 war in Lebanon, Silverstein noticed a spike in the number of visitors, many of them from Israel. After the war, he developed contacts with writers of similar viewpoints, such as Philip Weiss of Mondoweiss and Max Blumenthal.

== Reporting ==
In 2011, Silverstein described his source as a journalist based in Israel.

=== Shamai Leibowitz ===
Shamai Leibowitz was an Israeli-American FBI specialist who translated transcripts of wiretaps from Israel's Washington embassy. Silverstein believed Leibowitz was a whistleblower who was protected by U.S. law, but he consulted with security experts who warned him that publishing the documents would put him and Leibowitz at peril. Despite the warnings, he published portions of them.

The federal government prosecuted Leibowitz when it discovered what he had done, and Silverstein removed the blog posts related to the information Leibowitz had given him. Leibowitz eventually accepted a plea arrangement that included a 20-month prison term. The New York Times published a front-page account of the story, which included Silverstein's claims that Leibowitz had leaked the documents because of concerns about Israel's aggressive efforts to influence Congress and public opinion, and fears that Israel might strike nuclear facilities in Iran.

Leibowitz denied The New York Times report. On his blog, he wrote,

Contrary to what blogger Richard Silverstein told the NYT, my job never entailed listening to wiretaps of embassies, and that whole story was manufactured by Silverstein to promote his blog and his anti-Israel agenda.

=== Shin Bet and Mossad ===
Tikun Olam reported on the arrest of prominent Israeli Palestinian political activists Ameer Makhoul and Omar Said by the Shin Bet, who accused them of spying against Israel on behalf of Hezbollah. According to Silverstein, neither detainee was permitted to consult an attorney for several weeks, and Makhoul contends that his alleged confession was extracted under torture. Said pleaded to a reduced charge and went free. Makhoul later admitted to spying for Hezbollah, as part of a plea bargain.

In 2010, the blog was reportedly the first to publish the names of the candidates for chief of Mossad and Shin Bet. The blog reported that Yitzhak Ilan was the likely candidate to succeed current Shin Bet director, Yuval Diskin. By law, Israeli publications are only allowed to publish the names of the Shabak and Mossad directors, but no subordinate personnel. In Israeli news reports, Ilan has been referred to as "Y." Shin Bet officials also considered Ilan the likely candidate, but eventually he lost the race to Yoram Cohen. Tikun Olam was the first media outlet to report by name that Tamir Pardo, known in the Israeli media as "T." was a candidate to replace Meir Dagan as Mossad director. Subsequently, Pardo was named to the top job.

In 2011, Silverstein was one of the first to report that Gaza civil engineer, Dirar Abu Sisi, had been kidnapped by the Mossad in Ukraine, brought to Israel and imprisoned for allegedly being the mastermind behind Hamas' rocket program. The BBC World Service program, "Assignment", produced a radio documentary on the affair.

=== Anat Kamm–Uri Blau affair ===
The blog was the first to report that Anat Kamm, a former IDF soldier, was being secretly held by the Shin Bet for leaking secret military documents to Haaretz reporter Uri Blau. The security service had placed news of her arrest under gag so it could not be reported by Israeli media.

=== Prisoner X affair ===
Silverstein wrote in December 2010 that a prisoner, known as "Prisoner X", was held in extreme secrecy at Ayalon Prison. Silverstein wrote that this person was Iranian general Ali-Reza Asgari, who he asserted had been abducted by Mossad. Silverstein's assertion concerning the prisoner's identity proved wrong. The secret prisoner turned out to be Ben Zygier, an Australian-Israeli former Mossad officer. According to The New York Times, Silverstein then asserted that his source apparently was part of “a ruse designed to throw the media off the scent of the real story.”

=== The "Bibi’s Secret War Plan" affair ===
On August 15, 2012, a Tikun Olam blog entry entitled "Bibi’s Secret War Plan" centered around a "scoop"—a document purporting to outline plans for a secret Israeli attack against Iran. Silverstein claimed to have received the "secret" document from an Israel Defense Forces officer to “expose the arguments and plans advanced by the Bibi-Barak two-headed warrior”.

The blog post was picked up by several mainstream media outlets, including the BBC, until Maariv exposed it as plagiarism of an imaginary scenario of an article that had been published several days earlier on the Israeli online forum “Fresh”. It was written by veteran Fresh contributor “Sirpad,” who clearly stated that it was “based on foreign and non-classified sources and on the author’s own imagination.” Silverstein denied having ever visited the website in question, but the website's administrators refuted this in a statement they released on the site, which said Silverstein had a registered account on the site and had made twelve posts there, the last one of which was deleted and resulted in a six-month suspension of his account for publishing classified information.

=== The Israeli drones affair ===
In October 2013, Silverstein wrote a series of articles alleging that Israeli drones were being hacked by Iranians. The initial article, about a drone that crashed off the Israeli coast, was reported in other media outlets. A second article explained how a hack caused the crash. In a third article, Silverstein reported on an Israeli-made Azerbaijani drone about which "concerns of successful Iranian penetration were raised". It was later revealed Silverstein's source was an Israeli who intentionally fed Silverstein false information.

=== Avera Mengistu affair ===
In October 2014, the blog reported an Israeli Ethiopian was held in Gaza. A month before the gag order was lifted, Avera Mengistu's name was published in the blog. Silverstein speculated the gag order was in place to avoid a solidarity campaign, similar to Gilad Shalit's campaign, which might increase the price Hamas might demand for Mengistu's release.

=== Other reports ===
In February 2014, Silverstein published the names of two Israeli arms dealers who, he said, were involved in illicitly exporting military equipment to Iran via Greece. Also in February 2014, Silverstein was the first to publish the name of Naim Araidi, Israeli ambassador to Norway, who was sent home on sexual harassment allegations.

In March 2016, the story of Chaim Shacham, an Israeli diplomat who was suspended amid child abuse allegations, was first reported in Tikun Olam.

In September 2017, Silverstein published a secret decision by Israeli Supreme Court, allowing arms exports to Myanmar to continue.

== Reception ==
The Jewish Daily Forward reporter Nathan Guttman writes that Silverstein "has become a prime address for Israelis seeking to bypass their country’s censorship or court gag orders... Some praise his work as a courageous effort to tear down walls of secrecy surrounding Israel’s security agencies" while "others accuse him of recklessness motivated by a drive to blemish Israel at all costs."

The pro-Israel group CAMERA characterizes Silverstein as a "radical, anti-Israel blogger who repeatedly defends Hamas while blaming the Israeli government, and who promotes Israel as a single state of all its citizens." Silverstein responded that he believes Israel is a Jewish homeland, that he hopes to see equal rights provided for Jewish and Arab citizens in the country and though he is "agnostic" toward the two-state solution, would ultimately prefer that outcome.

Yossi Melman, a veteran security and intelligence reporter for Haaretz, argues that Silverstein "spreads rumors without checking them" and "is an ideologue, not a journalist." He adds, "[Silverstein] is speculative. It is like at the casino: Sometimes he gets it right, and sometimes he doesn’t." Nonetheless, Melman writes that the blog is important because it exposes the shortcoming of censorship in the age of 21st century technology. He described Silverstein's writing style on the blog as self-righteous, hypocritical, irresponsible and hostile to Israel, noting that "Silverstein describes himself as a "progressive Zionist", but his hatred of Israel, which is expressed in his hostile publications, many of which are speculative and baseless, indicates that he is actually anti-Zionist. In the past he supported the establishment of one state as a solution to the Israeli-Palestinian conflict, called IDF soldiers "subhuman", compared Israel to Nazi Germany, and revealed the name and address of a Zionist blogger to the point of risking his life." After the "Fresh" scandal, Melman criticized the Israeli media for assenting to the blog scoops though "it has been fooled for years". He calls some of Silverstein's stories "irresponsible" because they hurt people personally and have caused international tension between Israel, the UN, and Iran.

According to Der Spiegel, "The blogger who lives in the United States is considered to be very well informed when it comes to Israeli security matters. His blog 'Tikun Olam' regularly exposes stories which cannot be published in Israel due to military censorship."

According to journalist Richard Spencer, the blog "has a record of revealing information censored inside Israel".

Journalist Ehud Yaari describes the blog's credibility and reports as "highly doubtful".

Guy Lehrer of Israel's Channel 10 news explains that unlike Wikileaks which brings to light new information that their team had gathered, Silverstein reveals information that is already known to a large group of people but cannot be revealed in Israel due to publication bans which may effects censorship decisions. Lehrer adds there are many stories on the blog, some horrifying, but without verification it is hard to say what is true and what isn't.

The French newsmagazine L'Obs said that "Simply mentioning Silverstein's name in an article might precipitate a publication proscription. His case illustrates the lost war of military censorship in the digital era. Faced with social media and the instantaneous transmission of information, the system, designed to function on the basis of a "gentleman's agreement" with a few established publishers, has reached its limits.
