= Death of Ben Zygier =

Australian-Israeli citizen who died at Ayalon Prison in Israel in 2010

Ben Zygier
- בן זיגייר
- Born: 9 December 1976; Melbourne, Victoria, Australia
- Died: 15 December 2010 (aged 34); Ramla, Israel
- Other names: Ben Alon; Ben Allen; Benjamin Burrows; Prisoner X

External images
- Photograph of Ben Zygier
- Zygier's tombstone in Melbourne; Both images appeared in ABC's Foreign Correspondent program

Ben Zygier (Hebrew: בן זיגייר) was an Australian-Israeli citizen who was a veteran of the Israel Defense Forces and allegedly an agent of Mossad. He was imprisoned in Ayalon Prison, Ramla, Israel and died in custody in 2010, reportedly by hanging himself in a maximum-security cell designed to be suicide-proof. Prisoner X, Mr. X and Mister X were placeholder names for him while he was being held in strict secrecy for unspecified crimes.

== Early reports (2010) ==
Rumour of the potential existence of a prisoner who was held in Israel for unspecified crimes at Ayalon Prison, a maximum-security prison in Ramla, first surfaced when an Israeli news website (Ynet) briefly posted an article about him in 2010. The article was taken down within hours, and was allegedly removed because the Israeli security services had a gag order imposed. These reports claimed that the man was confined in total seclusion, was being housed in the cell that was built for Yigal Amir, the assassin of Yitzhak Rabin, and that he was being held in such secrecy that even his guards did not know his identity.

The Association for Civil Rights in Israel sent a letter to the Attorney General, Yehuda Weinstein, protesting the conditions of this man's detention. The chief legal counsel for the Association, Dan Yakir, wrote: "It is insupportable that, in a democratic country, authorities can arrest people in complete secrecy and disappear them from public view without the public even knowing such an arrest took place." Weinstein's deputy replied that, "The current gag order is vital for preventing a serious breach of the state's security, so we can not elaborate about this affair".

== Identification as Zygier ==
=== ABC reports ===
Journalist Trevor Bormann of the Australian Broadcasting Corporation (ABC) investigated the story for about 10 months after receiving a tip during a visit to Israel in April 2012. His findings were reported in February 2013 on the ABC television program Foreign Correspondent, which claimed there was strong evidence that Prisoner X was Ben Zygier, a dual citizen of Israel and Australia, and who carried an Australian passport in the name of Ben Allen.

Bormann reported that Zygier had been a Mossad agent before being imprisoned, and was found by prison guards hanged in his cell on 15 December 2010 and buried at the Chevra Kadisha Jewish Cemetery, in Melbourne, Victoria. Zygier, who came from a prominent Jewish family in Melbourne, had made aliyah (emigrated to Israel) fourteen years before his suicide, taken the more Israeli name Ben Alon, and was married with two children. He reportedly also used the names Ben Allen and Benjamin Burrows in Australia.

In a further report broadcast by the ABC on 7 May 2013, Bormann stated that Zygier was being punished for having "unwittingly sabotaged a top secret spy operation aimed at bringing home the bodies of Israeli soldiers missing in Lebanon" since the time of Israel's 1982 invasion of Lebanon.

=== Biography ===
Ben Zygier (9 December 1976 – 15 December 2010) was born in Melbourne to a prominent Jewish family. His father Geoffrey was head of the B'nai Brith Anti-Defamation Commission and was active in other Jewish organisations. His mother Louise worked at Monash University and raised funds for the local Jewish Community Center. Zygier participated in the Hashomer Hatzair, a Socialist–Zionist, secular Jewish youth movement. After completing his law studies, he made aliyah as part of Hashomer Hatzair in 1994 and volunteered at Kibbutz Gazit together with a group of other Australian Jews. After completing his military service in the Israel Defense Forces, he was recruited into the Mossad in the early 2000s, and from 2003 to 2004 worked at the prestigious Herzog, Fox & Neeman law firm. In 2006, he married an Israeli woman, and the couple had two daughters. In 2009, he briefly returned to Australia to obtain an MBA at Monash University.

=== Alleged spy activities ===
Zygier was recruited to the Mossad in the early 2000s. According to a report in the Sydney Morning Herald, Zygier was investigated by the Australian Security Intelligence Organisation (ASIO) for allegedly using his Australian passport to spy for Israel. He was reportedly questioned by ASIO during a visit to Australia. He also reportedly visited Iran, Syria, and Lebanon with his Australian passport.

According to a report by the German news magazine Der Spiegel, Zygier was originally enlisted into the service of the Mossad in 2003 and eventually served the organisation by entering the ranks of European companies doing business with Iran and Syria. However, Zygier proved to be a somewhat incompetent spy and in 2007 he was demoted and ordered to return to Israel, after his work failed to meet the Mossad's expectations. He left the organisation in 2008 to return to his native Australia.

In January or February 2010, shortly before his arrest, an Australian investigative journalist confronted Zygier about his potential involvement with the Mossad. The journalist, Jason Koutsoukis, had been tipped off that ASIO was searching for Australian-Israeli spies. Zygier vehemently denied any espionage activity, connection with the Mossad, or visits to Iran and Syria. The reporter had come to believe based on his research that Zygier worked at one point for a front company in Europe run by the Mossad that sold defective electronic equipment to Iran.

On 24 March 2013, Der Spiegel reported that, in a desperate attempt to return to the Mossad, Zygier had given a Hezbollah operative the names of two top Lebanese informants for Israel, Siad al-Homsi and Mustafa Ali Awadeh. As a result, the two informants were arrested in Lebanon in 2009 for spying for Israel and sentenced to long prison terms. Their arrest led to a widely publicized wave of arrests and trials of Lebanese citizens accused of spying for Israel. According to the report, Zygier had hoped to turn the Hezbollah operative into a double agent working for Israel. The Hezbollah operative, however, double-crossed him, sending information on the two informants back to Hezbollah headquarters in Beirut. Zygier had given the Hezbollah operative information on the informants, who were Israel's top Lebanese assets, to prove he had access to valuable knowledge, according to the report. The Australian news organisation Fairfax Media, which carried out the joint investigation with Der Spiegel, claimed that Zygier's contacts with the Hezbollah operative were part of a "rogue" operation by which he attempted to impress Mossad and get back in his superiors' good graces following his demotion.

== Detention in Israel ==
Prisoner X was held at Unit 15 in Ayalon Prison, a special wing of the prison reserved for the most dangerous criminals. The cell in which he was held was a special isolation cell originally constructed to house Yigal Amir, the assassin of Prime Minister Yitzhak Rabin. The cell is isolated from the rest of the wing through a door only prison staff can enter.

According to a Haaretz report, the cell is 16 square meters in size, and includes a table, chair, bed, television, and several personal items. The cell bathroom stall and shower area is separated from the rest of the cell by a transparent door that hides the inmate's genitals, and the camera in the bathroom is not normally activated, but the bathroom has a special monitoring system that works by identifying breathing and body movements. If no movement is detected after a certain period, the camera in the bathroom is activated and an alarm is raised. The showerhead is also flexible to prevent any suicide-by-hanging attempt by an inmate. During Zygier's stay there, the cell was under constant camera surveillance.

Prisoner X was isolated from the rest of the prison population, but he was allowed visits from his lawyers. According to an article in The Australian, the Zygier family was told very little about the nature of Ben's activities, but they were satisfied that his legal rights were being upheld by Israeli authorities.

=== Nature of charges ===
The Australian investigation concluded that Zygier was facing trial on serious espionage charges, and potentially faced a 20-year prison sentence. One of Zygier's lawyers, Avigdor Feldman, said in an interview with Israel Army Radio that Zygier was accused of "grave crimes" but that he maintained his innocence. Feldman revealed that Zygier had been indicted but not yet tried, and that the two of them were considering options for a plea bargain. Feldman also said that he did not encounter resistance from authorities in meeting with his client, but that prison authorities should have been more vigilant in looking out for his safety. Feldman stated in a later interview that Zygier was uninterested in a plea bargain and wanted to completely clear his name. In yet another interview, Feldman disputed that Zygier was a traitor. He could not specify the charge, but he maintained Zygier's actions "[did] not threaten the security or the government of Israel". Zygier also complained to Feldman that his treatment was "extremely unfair".

A report in the Kuwaiti newspaper Al-Jarida, citing "Western sources", said that Zygier was accused of offering to sell the names of the Mossad agents responsible for the assassination of Mahmoud Al-Mabhouh to the government of Dubai. The report also stated that the Dubai government agreed to protect Zygier, but that Mossad officials discovered his whereabouts and kidnapped him so he could stand trial in Israel. Dubai Police Chief Dhahi Khalfan Tamim denied the story in an interview.

A different theory was aired in Australian media, which alleged that Zygier may have been about to "blow the whistle" on Israeli intelligence operations involving the use of forged Australian passports, and was about to reveal the information either to the Australian government or to the media before he was arrested. An Australian security official was quoted as saying that Zygier "may well have been about to blow the whistle, but he never got the chance". On 31 January 2010, Zygier was arrested. Eight days later, after Dubai revealed details about the assassination of Hamas leader Mahmoud al-Mabhouh, Israel informed Australia of Zygier's arrest.

A source told ABC's Foreign Correspondent program that Zygier leaked information on his work with Mossad to ASIO. He allegedly detailed numerous Mossad operations, including a future mission in Italy that had been planned over a number of years. There was no information given as to whether ASIO or Zygier initiated the contact. Israel and Australia have both denied the allegation. Israeli Prime Minister Benjamin Netanyahu's office stated that "Mr Zygier had no contact with the Australian security services and organisations", whilst a spokeswoman for the Australian Attorney-General Mark Dreyfus has described the Israeli statement as consistent with the full briefing ASIO gave the Attorney-General. Sources close to Mossad expressed doubts that talking to Australian security services would 'earn' Zygier such a harsh treatment. However, Israeli journalist Alon Ben-David, who is familiar with the case but is still bound by the gag order, suggested that "it's fair to assume that Zygier was charged with divulging state secrets to a foreign element", but noted he did not act out of malice, but out of distress. He further stated that "They were negotiating a plea bargain and it was not about a serious punishment, but a moderate one."

On 24 March 2013, Der Spiegel reported that Zygier had leaked the names of two Mossad informants in Lebanon who had infiltrated Hezbollah: Ziad al-Homsi and Mustafa Ali Awadeh, to a Hezbollah supporter. Homsi and Awadeh were arrested on espionage charges and sentenced to 15 years' hard labour; their arrests also led to a widely publicised wave of arrests of Lebanese citizens accused of spying for Israel. The newspaper claimed to have obtained a copy of an internal Israeli inquiry, which stated that Zygier began working for Mossad at age 23. He was sent to work in European companies doing business with Iran and Syria with the purpose of penetrating those countries. A year later, he was allowed to return to Australia to finish his academic studies, but before leaving for Australia, he tried to recruit new informants, during which he exposed information that led to the arrest of Homsi and Awadeh.

A book by Rafael Epstein alleges that Zygier told an Iranian businessman details of a Mossad operation in Iran. Zygier supposedly revealed the information while he was studying in Australia in 2009.

=== Death ===
It is believed that Zygier died on 15 December 2010. Feldman, Zygier's attorney, had met with his client the day before. Feldman said he saw no signs of suicidal thoughts when they met. According to Feldman, Zygier was "rational and focused", although anxious about his upcoming trial. However, according to official court documents, Zygier had an emotional meeting with his wife on the day of his death in which she gave him difficult news, after which he was crying and distraught. He also had a history of suicide attempts.

The cause of Zygier's death has been the matter of some speculation. Ynet posted on 27 December 2010 that an inmate at Ayalon Prison had committed suicide two weeks prior by hanging himself, but the story was suppressed. ABC's exposé claimed that a death certificate for a Ben Alon (the name Zygier adopted when he immigrated to Israel) was issued by a coroner at the Abu Kabir Forensic Institute. The cause of death was listed as asphyxiation by hanging, and the location of death as Ramla, the city which hosts Ayalon Prison. According to the ABC, the cell in which he was held was supposedly suicide-proof and constantly monitored by surveillance cameras, leading it to question how Zygier was able to hang himself. However the chief of Israel's prison service rejected the claims saying that the cell was not specially supervised, nor was it considered suicide proof. The prison service also stated that it wanted Zygier's complete supervision orders made public, which it believes would mitigate its responsibility.

Israel's Channel 10 TV news cited unnamed members of Zygier's rescue crew who claimed the inmate hanged himself in the bathroom, out of view of surveillance cameras. A photograph from surveillance footage during Yigal Amir's incarceration in Unit 15 appears to show a separate, adjacent room from the main cell containing a shower and bathroom. A supposed transcript of a phone call from the prison to the Magen David Adom emergency services was read aloud on Channel 10 news, in which the caller reportedly said, "he's hanged himself", and requested a mobile intensive care unit.

An investigation by the Israel Prison Service concluded that Zygier hanged himself from the bars in his cell bathroom. Zygier took a sheet to the bathroom, presumably on the pretense of washing it, and tied it to the bars on his window without guards noticing. Zygier had not been placed on suicide watch, and as a result, the guards only checked on him every 20–25 minutes rather than every few minutes.

Six weeks before the emergence of the ABC report, a lengthy inquiry by Israeli magistrate judge Daphna Blatman Kedrai concluded that it was suicide. Kedrai recommended that a further inquiry be drawn into whether Israeli prison authorities were negligent in his death. After the inquiry, Israel reportedly offered the Zygier family considerable financial compensation for his death. An Israeli official denied that compensation was offered, arguing that none would be necessary until negligence had been proven. In February 2013, in the face of mounting media scrutiny, 8 pages of a 28-page report prepared by Judge Kedrai at the conclusion of her inquiry in December 2012, was released to the public. In the report Kedrai determined Zygier had died as the result of suicide, but found prison officers had contributed to the circumstances leading to his death. The judge said "orders had been given to prevent suicide," and that "these orders were not upheld." Judge Kedrai reported that bruises had been found on Zygier's body but could not determine whether they occurred before or after his death. She noted traces of a tranquilliser drug were found in Zygier's body but did not make anything of it. Whilst leaving her findings open, the judge said she could not negate "the active intervention on the part of another person who intentionally caused his death," but her report said this was negated by "the examination of the conditions of imprisonment that denied entry to the cell and the contents of the camera sweeps that negated the entry of another person into the cell."

In September 2013, the Israeli government reached a settlement with the Zygier family, agreeing to pay NIS 4 million in compensation, consisting of an initial payment of NIS 2.4 million in 2013, followed by payments of NIS 400,000 every year for four years. As part of the agreement, the Israeli government was not to assume responsibility for the circumstances that led to his suicide, or any misconduct that may have taken place during the process of Zygier's recruitment to Mossad.

== Reactions ==
=== Israel ===
After the ABC report was released, the Israeli government refused to comment, but reportedly asked media chiefs not to publish "information pertaining to an incident that is very embarrassing to a certain government agency".

Following the revelation, Knesset members Dov Khenin, Zehava Gal-On, and Ahmad Tibi in a public question time urged outgoing Israeli Justice Minister Yaakov Neeman to address the ABC report, and criticised the government's conduct. Israel outgoing Minister of Public Security Yitzhak Aharonovich cancelled his next-day planned speech in the Knesset. Knesset officials believed it was to avoid answering questions by Knesset members. Nitzan Horowitz, who had originally filed a grievance over the matter in 2010, sent a letter to Attorney-General Yehuda Weinstein urging him to investigate, stating that "clandestine arrests and detentions are unacceptable and inconceivable in a democratic state. They pose a tangible threat to the rule of law and undermine the public's confidence in the legal system."

In the evening of 13 February 2013, the Israeli government published a statement confirming the existence of "Prisoner X" for the first time. Although the statement did not name Zygier as the inmate, it confirmed a few key details of the affair that had already been reported. The statement said that a dual national was held and imprisoned under a false name for security reasons, that he had hanged himself, and that a gag order had been in effect over the case. It also asserted that the prisoner was afforded legal representation during his detention and that his family was notified of the arrest.

According to the Israeli news website Ynet, Zygier's attorneys and family were required to sign non-disclosure agreements with the government, preventing them from acknowledging or denying aspects of the case reported in the press.

Ynet also reported that the heads of the Israeli intelligence community met in private on 14 February to discuss strategies for minimising the affair's damage to active operations.

=== Australia ===
The Australian government announced that it would investigate Zygier's death. On 14 February 2013, Australian Foreign Affairs Minister, Senator Bob Carr revealed details from an interim Department of Foreign Affairs and Trade report. He said that the Australian Government had been advised on 24 February 2010 that Israel had detained a dual Australian-Israeli citizen. The advice, through "intelligence channels", included the prisoner's name, and the allegation of "serious offences" under Israel's national security laws. The Australian Government received assurances from Israel regarding the individual's legal rights, his own choice for legal representation, notification of family members, his treatment whilst detained, and respect of his rights as an Israeli citizen. There was no request for consular assistance from either the individual or family members. On 16 December 2010, the government was advised through "intelligence channels" that the individual had died the previous day, and his family had been contacted by the authorities in Israel. The Australian embassy in Tel Aviv assisted in repatriating the body to Australia.

Although some Australian officials were aware of the detention, it is unclear how widespread this knowledge was. The information was not shared throughout the Foreign Affairs Department, according to Secretary Peter Varghese. Former attorney-general Robert McClelland was informed by ASIO on 1 March 2010 of Israel's detention of an unnamed dual citizen on security grounds, and said he authorised ASIO to brief other unspecified persons. The West Australian's federal political editor, Andrew Probyn commented that the Varghese report "exposes serial bureaucratic arse-covering in its contents, chronology and conclusions", and that "key government and agency personnel seemed to know all about the case but not know about it at the same time.

Representatives of the Australian Jewish community have kept quiet about the affair. Reasons they cited included fear of bringing up dual loyalty accusations and respecting the privacy of the Zygier family.

== See also ==
- Prisoner X2
- Lavon Affair – A previous secret Israeli Prisoner X, Avri Elad, from the Lavon Affair was detained at the Ayalon Prison in 1954, released in 1968, and died in self-exile in Los Angeles 1993.
- Death of Tomer Eiges
- Censorship in Israel
- Human rights in Israel
