= Death of Tomer Eiges =

Former Israeli Defence Forces officer

Tomer Eiges (October 15th 1996- May 17th 2021) was an Israeli IDF officer who served in the Military Intelligence Directorate, and died while in military prison awaiting trial for security offenses. He is said to have seriously harmed Israeli national security while acting independently from a personal motive.

The IDF chief of staff said Eiges should not have died in prison. His family have demanded review of his death, and have said the army tried to "erase" him.
