= Ayalon Prison =

Prison in Ramla, Israel

Coordinates: 31.9351°N 34.8813°E

Ayalon Prison בית סוהר איילון
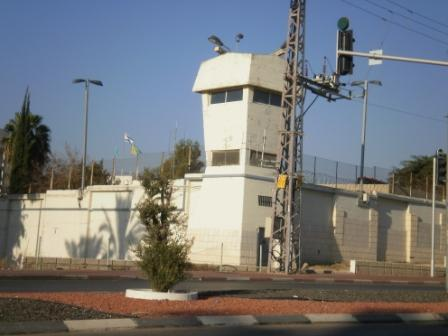
- View of a guard tower at the prison, 2010
- Interactive map of Ayalon Prison בית סוהר איילון
- Location: Ramla, Israel
- Status: Operational
- Security class: Maximum
- Capacity: 625 cells (15 wings)
- Opened: 1950
- Former name: Ramla Prison
- Managed by: Israel Prison Service

Ayalon Prison (Hebrew: בית סוהר איילון, romanized: Beit Sohar Ayalon), formerly known as Ramla Prison, is a maximum-security prison located in Ramla, Israel. It is managed by the Israel Prison Service.

The prison was opened in 1950, and was built in the style of the Tegart forts from the British Mandate era. It is one of four high-security criminal prisons operated by the Israel Prison Service. Ayalon Prison has 625 cells divided into 15 wings, including an isolation wing for prisoners in solitary confinement. It has an educational center with six classrooms for primary education and classes for English, computers and art. The prison also has facilities for meditation, sports, parenting, and drug rehabilitation, in addition to eight factories which employ inmates and a radio station operated by inmates selected and trained to broadcast rehabilitative and educational content to all other prisons in Israel.

== Notable inmates ==
- Adolf Eichmann, a Nazi German official and major organizer of the Holocaust during World War II; executed in 1962 following his capture by Mossad agents in Argentina. He is one of only two people to be legally executed in Israel since its independence. His executioner was Ramla guard Shalom Nagar.
- Meir Kahane, was jailed there in 1980 for six months for planning armed attacks against Arabs. During his time there, he wrote his best-selling and controversial book, They Must Go.
- John Demjanjuk, a Ukrainian guard at Nazi death camps during the Holocaust; extradited from the United States to Israel in 1986 and imprisoned at Ayalon until his release in 1993.
- Yigal Amir, an Israeli right-wing ultranationalist who assassinated the fifth Prime Minister of Israel, Yitzhak Rabin, in 1995.
- Ben Zygier (or Prisoner X), an Australian-Israeli veteran of the Israel Defense Forces and alleged Mossad agent; imprisoned for unspecified crimes and died by suicide while in custody in December 2010.
- Yishai Schlissel, stabbed marchers at multiple Jerusalem pride parades in 2005 and 2015.
- Thiago Ávila, Brazilian human rights activist; detained by Israel in June 2025 alongside 11 other members of the Madleen, a ship which had sailed to break the Israeli blockade of the Gaza Strip. He was briefly moved to solitary confinement in Ayalon after going on a dry hunger strike.
