= Anat Kamm =

Israeli whistleblower and journalist

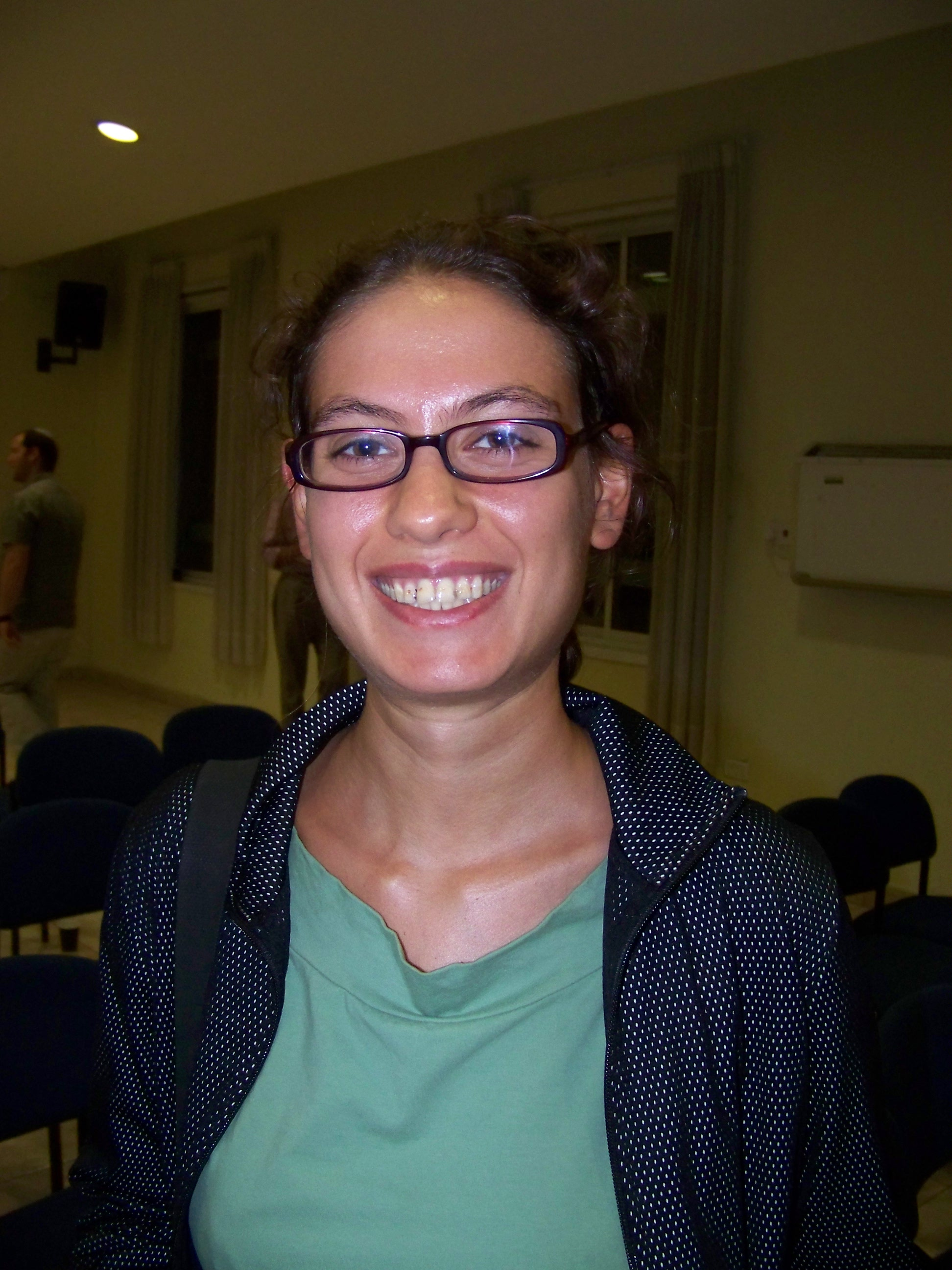
Anat Kam (2008)

Anat Kamm (alternative spelled Anat Kam, Hebrew: ענת קם; born in 1987 in Jerusalem) is an Israeli journalist and former whistleblower, who was convicted for espionage resulting in jail time for her role in the Anat Kamm–Uri Blau affair where she leaked more than 2,000 secret documents.

== Life ==
Born in Jerusalem in 1987, Kamm attended Hebrew University Secondary School. She became interested in journalism in her youth, writing for the local newspaper Jerusalem (formerly Yedioth Jerusalem), as well as for the youth channel of the website Walla!.

In July 2005, Kamm began her military service in the Israeli army. From 2005 to 2007, she completed this in the office of General Jair Naweh, the then head of the Israel Central Command in Neve Yaakov.

After completing her military service, she began studying history and philosophy at Tel Aviv University in November 2008. Most recently she wrote for the internet portal Walla!, on pop culture.

== Trial and sentencing ==
In January 2010, Kamm was charged with espionage and violating state security. She was accused of forwarding secret documents to Israeli investigative journalist Uri Blau while serving in the army, who allegedly used them to report on the illegal killing of three Palestinians by Israeli soldiers. The incident in question happened in Jenin in June 2007, and Blau's article appeared in Haaretz in November 2008. Kam is said to have copied a total of around 2000 pages, a good third of which are classified as "Top Secret". The Military Censorship Board had raised no objection to Blau's text.

Kamm was under house arrest as of December 2009; at the same time, a news blackout was imposed, which was only relaxed in early April 2010 after information about the case became known internationally. On 30 October 2011, she was sentenced to four and a half years in prison plus one and a half years probation for collecting, possessing, and disclosing classified military documents; the espionage charge was dropped. The almost two-year house arrest was not counted toward Kamm's sentence.

Kamm began her sentence on 23 November 2011 in Neve Tirza Women's Prison. On 31 December 2012, the Israeli Supreme Court reduced the sentence to three-and-a-half years plus one-and-a-half years' probation.

On 26 January 2014, Kamm was finally released early for good behavior after serving 26 months in prison.

Various parties have supported Kamm's actions, including Haaretz. Richard Silverstein classified Kamm on the same level of Julian Assange and Chelsea Manning, as a world-class whistleblower.
