= COVID-19 vaccination in Israel =

Plan to immunize against COVID-19

- Date: 19 December 2020 – present
- Location: Israel
- Cause: COVID-19 pandemic in Israel
- Target: Full immunisation of people in Israel against COVID-19

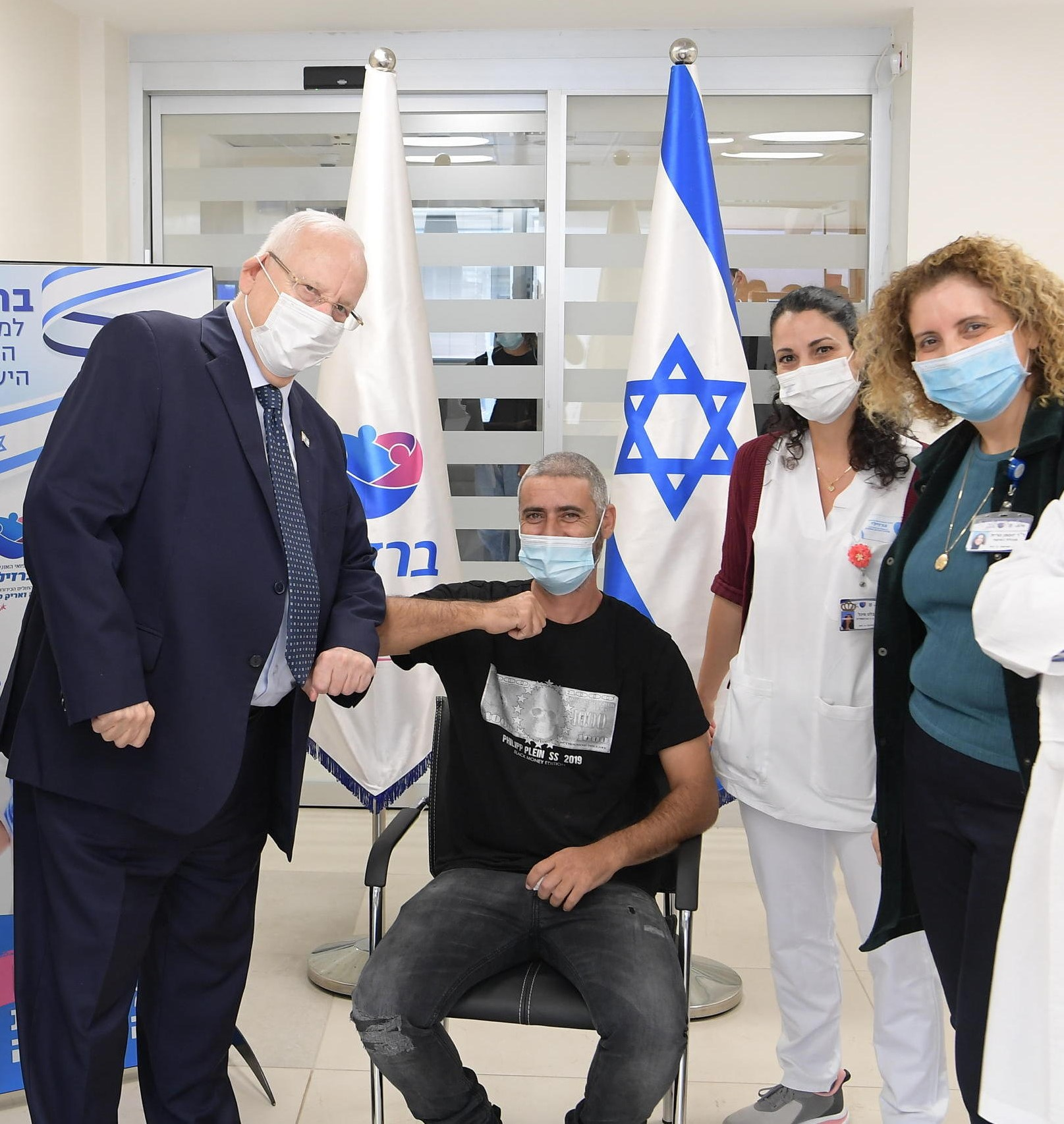
The President of Israel, Reuven Rivlin, with the first vaccinator in Phase B of the vaccine, at the Israel Institute for Biological Research, BriLife at the Barzilai Medical Center.

Israel's COVID-19 vaccination programme, officially named "Give a Shoulder" (Hebrew: לתת כתף), began on 19 December 2020, and has been praised for its speed, having given twenty percent of the Israeli population the first dose of the vaccines' two dose regimen in the span of three weeks.

As of June 26, 2021, about 64% of eligible Israelis have received at least one dose. Coordinated vaccination drives by the country's health authorities, utilizing databases of personal information for Israeli patients, contributed to Israel's success in vaccinating a high proportion of its population in a short period of time, relative to the rest of the world.

According to a September 2021 study published in The Lancet, COVID-19 vaccination in Israel prevented an additional 158,665 infections, 24,597 hospitalisations, 17,432 severe or critical hospitalisations, and 5,532 deaths from December 20, 2020, to April 10, 2021.

== Background ==
Many factors contributed to the quick distribution of vaccines in the state of Israel. Israel's population is younger on average than many other developed countries, with 12% of its population over the age of 65. (→ Demographics of Israel)

Israel is smaller in land area than many other developed nations. It has a comparatively small population of about 9.3 million people and a high population density (424/km^{2}). Israel's organized response in terms of attaining, storing and distributing vaccines was considered to be overall well coordinated. This is in part owed to the centralized nature of Israel's government system, which for example does not defer many health policy decisions to lower state-level bodies of government. The state purchased a substantial amount of Pfizer–BioNTech COVID-19 vaccines relative to its population as early as December 2020. In May 2020, the state secured agreements with companies which were developing vaccines, such as Moderna.

=== Vaccines on order ===
Vaccine	Approval	Deployment
Pfizer–BioNTech	Yes	Yes
Moderna	Yes	Yes

=== Vaccines in trial stage ===
Vaccine	Type (technology)	Phase I	Phase II	Phase III
Pfizer–BioNTech	ZUBR HMAR	Completed	Completed	Completed
The Israel Institute for Biological Research	Viral vector	Completed	Completed	—N/a
MigVax-101	VLP	Not yet	Not yet	Not yet

== History ==
Early into the programme, Israel provided Pfizer with medical information about its citizens as part of a deal for the country to receive a supply COVID-19 vaccines from the company.

The initial campaign for vaccinations focused on the elderly (people over the age of 60) and other patient groups with a high risk of severe illness in the case of infection, such as those with preexisting conditions, as well as employees of the healthcare sector. After eight weeks, nearly 85% of health workers at a hospital in Jerusalem (Hadassah Hebrew University Medical Center) were vaccinated.

Israel started its campaign on 19 December 2020, with prime minister Benjamin Netanyahu being the first person in the country to receive the vaccine, getting injected on live TV to encourage other Israelis to get vaccinated. In less than two weeks, over 10% of Israelis received their first dose.

Mass vaccination in Israel has produced evidence that the Pfizer vaccine works to stop transmission of the virus, including asymptomatic infections. The vaccination programme has also curbed deaths in the country.

As of early February 2021, at least 90% of Israelis over the age of 60 received at least one dose of the Pfizer vaccine, and there was a 41% drop in confirmed infections in the country compared with the previous month. By late February, at least 4.8 million Israelis received at least one dose. This mass vaccination led to a drop in severe COVID-19 cases. Israel passed a law allowing government workers to identify and contact those who have not been vaccinated, in order to convince them to do so.

To access certain locations such as gyms, hotels, and theatres, immunized residents show a green pass (also known as a "green badge"), which was officially introduced by the Israeli Ministry of Health on February 21. The green pass indicates the holder is immunized against COVID-19, either by vaccination or previous infection. People who have received both doses of a COVID-19 vaccine are eligible to receive this certificate of vaccination. It expires after six months.

As of March 2021, Israel has the highest vaccinated population per capita in the world. About 60% of residents in Israel received at least one dose of COVID-19 vaccine by March, and certain public places reopened access for those who were vaccinated. Only about 100,000 residents over the age of 50 remained unvaccinated. By March, at least 50% of the Israeli population had received both doses of the Pfizer vaccine.

The perceived success of Israel's vaccination programme has been credited to the centralized systems its health maintenance organizations maintained, especially with regard to managing the personal health data of Israelis. They were able to coordinate national vaccination drives, contacting residents directly using a database of contact information such as phone numbers and emails. Every Israeli citizen must register with one of the country's four HMOs.

On 10 November 2021, the Israeli Government approved the use of COVID-19 vaccine shots for children between the ages of 5 and 11 years. Israeli epidemiologists and health authorities have identified vaccine hesitancy among parents as an obstacle to getting children vaccinated.

On 22 December 2021, an Israeli government panel recommended a fourth dose for the elderly and immunocompromised population. On 5 January 2022, Israeli President Isaac Herzog launched the fourth COVID-19 vaccination campaign, receiving his second booster at Hadassah Ein Kerem and urging Israeli citizens to get vaccinated against the omicron variant.

Waning vaccine immunity

Data from the national campaign showed there to be a strong effect of waning immunity from the Pfizer-BioNTech COVID-19 vaccine after 6 months. On 29 July 2021, Israel's Prime Minister announced that the country was rolling out a third dose of the Pfizer-BioNTech vaccine to people over the age of 60, based on the data that suggested significant waning immunity from infection over time for those with two doses. The country expanded the availability to all Israelis over the age of 12, after five months since their second shot. On 29 August 2021, Israel's coronavirus czar announced that Israelis who had not received a booster shot within six months of their second dose would lose access to the country's green pass vaccine passport.

== Distribution issues ==
Israeli authorities faced problems with distributing their supply of COVID-19 vaccines early into vaccination drives. This included trouble with scheduling appointments, loosely interpreted eligibility early on which led to supply problems, and lack of sufficient distribution to less populated villages and Arab-Israeli communities.

During the first quarter of 2021, Israel had to address a moderate amount of vaccine hesitancy in its general population, and also address more intense pockets of vaccine hesitancy among young adults and religious/cultural minority groups. The challenges were addressed via a mix of messaging, incentives, extensions to the initial vaccine delivery system, and other measures. Many of the measures addressed the general population, while others were targeted at subgroups with below-average vaccination rates. Once the early adopters had been vaccinated, it took hard, creative work to increase population coverage from 40 to 60% and beyond.

Distribution of vaccines to Palestinians has not been as thorough as to Israeli citizens. In early March, the supply of COVID-19 vaccines was not sufficient to cover all of its healthcare workers. Until March, when Israel began vaccinating Palestinian laborers with the Moderna COVID-19 vaccine, the Palestinian Authority received only enough doses for about 6,000 people. Gaza has a population of about 2 million, by comparison. United Nations officials called for more support for vaccinating Palestinians, and praised Israel's assistance in this regard, while Amnesty International expressed concern that Israel had not done more for Palestinians with regard to the COVID-19 pandemic. Some Israeli health officials urged the government to provide vaccinations to all Palestinians.

According to Business Insider, Israeli citizens of any origin as well as Palestinian residents in East Jerusalem were eligible for the vaccine, with people older than 60, healthcare workers, and the "especially vulnerable" being prioritized. However, an estimated five million Palestinians in the West Bank and Gaza (which are not under Israeli control) were not eligible as their healthcare is under the jurisdiction of the Palestinian Authority per the Oslo Accords.

By late March, Israel vaccinated more than 100,000 Palestinian laborers. In June 2021, Israel announced it would give over 1 million soon-to-expire Pfizer vaccines to the Palestinian Authority in exchange for a later reimbursement of a similar amount of vaccines which the Palestinian Authority expects to receive from Pfizer in the first quarter of 2022. In June 18, 100,000 of these doses had already been transferred to the West Bank's Palestinian Health Ministry. However, the Palestinian Authority soon pulled out of the exchange deal, saying the doses expired too fast.

As of March 2021, Haredi Jews and Arab-Israelis had a lower rate of vaccination, compared to other sections of the population in Israel. These demographics were also comparatively more likely to be hesitant or skeptical about taking the vaccine. Haredi Jews are about 12% of Israel's population.

Almost 100,000 (or about 2% of vaccinated Israelis) did not receive their second dose after their first dose. According to officials from Israel's Ministry of Health, two contributing factors to a reluctance to receive the second dose are misinformation and a fear of side effects. Compared to the original speed at which vaccines were being administered, vaccinations in Israel have slowed, according to the Ministry of Health.
