= Operation Cast Thy Bread =

1948 Israeli biological warfare operation

- Part of the 1948 Palestine war and the Nakba
- Type: Biological warfare, war crime, ethnic cleansing
- Location: Palestine, Lebanon, Egypt, and Syria
- Commanded by: David Ben-Gurion and Yigael Yadin
- Target: Palestinian Arab civilians and allied Arab armies
- Date: April–December 1948
- Executed by: Israel: Haganah; Israel Defense Forces
- Outcome: Zionist forces cause a typhoid epidemic in Acre and capture the city, infecting dozens of local citizens; Depopulation of several Palestinian Arab villages
- Casualties: Unknown

Operation Cast Thy Bread was a top-secret biological warfare operation conducted by the Haganah and later the Israel Defense Forces that began in April 1948, during the 1948 Palestine war. The Haganah used typhoid bacteria to contaminate drinking water wells in violation of the 1925 Geneva Protocol. Its objective was to frighten and prevent Palestinian Arabs from returning to their captured villages and to make conditions difficult for Arab armies attempting to retake territories. The operation resulted in severe illness among local Palestinian citizens. In the final months of the war, the government of Israel gave orders to expand the biological warfare campaign into neighboring Arab states such as Egypt, Lebanon, and Syria, but they were not carried out. Israeli prime minister David Ben-Gurion and IDF chief of general staff Yigael Yadin oversaw and approved the use of biological warfare.

Abba Eban, representative of the Jewish Agency for Palestine, strongly denied the operation and sought to block further investigations by accusing the Arab states of engaging in "antisemitic incitement". Operation Cast Thy Bread did not achieve the crippling effects its advocates had hoped for, and was discontinued by December 1948. In July 1948, the Palestinian Arab Higher Committee reported to the United Nations several war crimes committed by Zionist forces, including the use of "bacteriological warfare".

== Background ==
According to Avner Cohen, the Haganah's chief operations officer, Yigael Yadin, dispatched a microbiology student named Alexander Keynan to Jaffa on 18 February 1948 to set up a unit known as HEMED BEIT. Keynan and future Israeli president Ephraim Katzir "planned various activities, to get a sense what chemical and biological weapons are and how we could build a potential should there be a need for such a potential". Their main objective was to create a weapon that could blind people.

In April 1948, David Ben-Gurion ordered an official of the Jewish Agency in Europe to find Eastern European Jewish scientists who could "either increase the capacity to kill masses or to cure masses; both are important". According to Milton Leitenberg, that "capacity" meant chemical and biological weapons, which could be used for either offense or defense. One of the scientists recruited was Marcus Klingberg, an epidemiologist and colonel in the Red Army.

== Operations ==
=== In Palestine ===
Benny Morris reported that Israeli soldiers transported typhoid germs in bottles to the southern front. British, Arab, and Red Cross documents reveal that Zionist forces introduced poison into wells in Acre and Eilabun in Galilee, leading to severe illness among dozens of local residents. Acre, which was allocated to a future Arab state by the United Nations Partition Plan for Palestine, heavily relied on its aqueduct for water. The contamination of these wells triggered a typhoid epidemic and "state of extreme distress" among the inhabitants, as noted by the mayor of Acre on 3 May. The Carmeli Brigade of the Haganah allegedly used a biological weapon in the battle of Acre in May 1948. In June, an Israeli intelligence report concluded that deliberately inducing the epidemic had played a significant role in Acre's rapid fall to Haganah forces.

The Haganah also poisoned the depopulated Palestinian Arab village of Bayt Mahsir and water sources in Palestinian neighborhoods in Jerusalem.

The operation was carried out by ordinary IDF soldiers and later the Mista'arvim, an undercover unit specializing in sabotage operations within enemy territory, disguising themselves as Palestinians.

=== Against neighboring Arab states ===
In May 1948, during Operation Shalach, four Israeli Special Forces soldiers disguised as Arabs attempted to poison the local water supply in Gaza to impede the Egyptian army's advance. They infiltrated the city with tubes containing typhoid germs. The Israeli soldiers were captured by Egyptian soldiers near water wells on 23 May and executed by an Egyptian military court on 22 August 1948. Egypt complained about the incident to the United Kingdom, but the Foreign Office decided it was best to stay uninvolved. However, one British official remarked that the situation was so "obnoxious" that Britain might consider expressing its "disgust" to the Israelis if the opportunity arose.

== Reactions ==
=== Palestinian Arabs ===
On 22 July 1948, the Arab Higher Committee presented a formal complaint to the United Nations of the various war crimes committed by "Palestinian Jews", including engaging in "bacteriological warfare". The committee accused the Zionists of having constructed laboratories in Palestine for biological warfare purposes and of having "planned and prepared for the use of bacteriological warfare" over a protracted period of time. The committee also suggested that there was some inconclusive evidence linking the cholera outbreaks in Egypt and Syria in late 1947 and early 1948, respectively, to actions taken by Zionist forces.

=== Israel ===
Israel vehemently denied the accusations of well poisoning and biological warfare against Palestinian Arabs, denouncing the Egyptian allegations as "wicked libel". Israel said the four Israeli soldiers captured by Egyptian troops in Gaza were there to observe military activities and evaluate the Arab population's morale. Abba Eban denied the well poisoning operation and attempted to block further investigations by accusing the Arab states of engaging in "antisemitic incitement".

== See also ==
- Israeli war crimes
- Israel and weapons of mass destruction
