= Yedidim =

Israeli volunteer roadside assistance organization

- ידידים - סיוע בדרכים
- Formation: 2006
- Founder: Meir Wiener
- Type: Non-profit
- CEO: Israel Almasi
- Website: yedidim-il.org

Yedidim (Hebrew: ידידים) is an Israeli non-profit volunteer organization that provides free non-medical roadside and emergency assistance throughout Israel. Founded in 2006, the organization operates a nationwide network of volunteers assisting motorists with vehicle emergencies, including battery jump-starts, tire changes, fuel delivery, lockouts, and rescuing children trapped inside vehicles.

== History ==
Yedidim was founded in 2006 by Meir Wiener as a local volunteer initiative providing assistance to drivers with flat tires and depleted batteries. Over the following years, the initiative expanded into a regional network. In 2012, Israel Almasi joined the organization, later becoming its CEO as operations were formalized and a centralized dispatch hotline was launched.

During the COVID-19 pandemic in Israel, the organization expanded its non-emergency civil support to include delivering food and essential medication to isolated elderly residents. By the early 2020s, the volunteer roster had grown to tens of thousands of active participants operating nationwide.

== Operations and services ==
Yedidim operates a nationwide dispatch system that coordinates volunteer responses to non medical roadside assistance requests. Services are provided free of charge and include jump starting vehicle batteries, changing flat tires, delivering fuel, and unlocking vehicles when keys are locked inside.

The organization maintains a specialized emergency unit equipped to unlock vehicles with trapped children or pets. Dispatch requests are processed through a centralized phone hotline and a mobile application that uses geolocation to notify the nearest available volunteer. Volunteers rely on their personal vehicles and equipment to perform assistance calls.

== Recognition and awards ==
The organization and its leadership have received several national awards for their volunteer activities in Israel. In April 2020, CEO Israel Almasi was selected to light a torch at the official Independence Day ceremony on Mount Herzl on behalf of the organization's volunteers.

In 2021, Yedidim was awarded the President's Award for Volunteerism by President Reuven Rivlin in recognition of its national civilian support operations. The organization has also received the Speaker of the Knesset Prize for Quality of Life for its contributions to public safety and community assistance.
