= Shimon Levinson =

Israeli intelligence officer and Soviet spy

- שמעון לוינזון
- Born: 31 January 1933; Jerusalem, Mandatory Palestine
- Occupations: Israeli intelligence officer; Soviet spy
- Criminal charge: Espionage
- Criminal penalty: 12 years in prison
- Criminal status: Released in 1999 after 7 years
- Military career
- Allegiance: Israel USSR
- Branch: Israel Defense Forces, Shin Bet, Mossad
- Service years: 1950–1978
- Rank: Colonel
- Other work: Agricultural consultant in Thailand

Shimon Levinson (Hebrew: שמעון לוינזון; born 31 January 1933) was a senior Israeli intelligence officer who was arrested for spying for the Soviet Union in 1991. He is considered to have been one of the highest-ranking KGB moles in Israel.

== Early life and career ==
Shimon Levinson was born in Jerusalem during the British Mandate era in 1933. In 1950, he enlisted in the Israel Defense Forces (IDF). From 1950 to 1953, he served as a member of the Israel-Jordan Armistice Committee. In 1954, he was appointed army attaché to Turkey, but that same year, he returned to the armistice committee as a coordinator between the IDF Intelligence Corps and the Jordanian Army, serving in this position until 1960. Though he repeatedly failed his officer exams, he was repeatedly promoted and eventually reached the honorary rank of colonel.

From 1960 to 1961, he participated in a vocational high course for intelligence, and was appointed head of the documentation section of the Military Intelligence Directorate. He eventually left the IDF out of frustration for not being promoted any further, and for a year, served as CEO of the Government Coins and Medals Corporation, but was forced into resignation after he filed a false complaint on corruption and mismanagement.

In March 1963, he was recruited by Shin Bet, Israel's internal security service, and served in its Jerusalem field office as head of a security vetting team. In 1965, he was transferred to Mossad, the Israeli external intelligence service, at his own request, and was employed in credibility checks. He was employed in Mossad until March 1967, and returned to the Israel-Jordan Armistice Committee until its dissolution in July 1967. He later joined Israel's United Nations liaison unit, and eventually became its commander, serving until 1970. He then returned to Mossad and joined TEVEL, the Mossad department responsible for liaison with allied governments, and served two years as head of the TEVEL station in Ethiopia. He was in charge of organizing secret military aid to the Ethiopian government in its war against Eritrean rebels.

He was reposted to Israel after causing a security mishap, and served as special assistant to the head of special liaison until 1973. In July 1973, he was reposted as IDF liaison colonel to the UN. He served in this position until 1978, when he retired from the IDF out of frustration over the refusal of IDF Chief of Staff Rafael Eitan to promote him any further.

After retiring from the IDF, Levinson exploited his connections with senior UN officials and arranged for himself to be posted to Thailand as head of a UN agency fighting the drug trade in East Asia, a job with a high salary. He served until June 1983, and near the end of his UN service in Thailand, he ran into financial troubles after repeated failed attempts to start his own businesses.

== KGB career ==
In April 1983, Levinson entered the Soviet embassy in Bangkok and offered to spy for the KGB, hoping to earn enough money to bail himself out of his financial problems. He would later admit to his Shin Bet interrogators that his sole motivation was money. Levinson would spy for the Soviet Union for a total of seven years, during which he would make $31,000 - far less than what he had hoped for.

Levinson was accepted, and sent to Moscow for tests. He was trained in the art of coded messages, radio communications, and secret rendezvous, and told what kind of information the KGB was interested in. He subsequently provided his handlers the structure of the Israeli intelligence community, providing detailed information including names and details of units, sub-units, identities of their chiefs, and their modus operandi, details on the Israeli Foreign Ministry, and even provided to KGB with original documents, and information on US intelligence officers in contact with Israeli intelligence. He also described to them the Israeli political system.

In 1984, he returned to Israel and tried to rejoin Mossad, but was rejected due to his character and traits. However, in May 1985, one of his friends, Maj. Gen. (ret.) Avraham Tamir, who was serving as Director-General of the Prime Minister's Office, appointed Levinson Chief Security Officer upon the recommendations of Prime Minister Shimon Peres and former IDF and Shin Bet officers. This new job gave him access to all classified information available to the Prime Minister, which he turned over to the KGB. He also provided his KGB handlers with the structure of the Prime Minister's Office.

== Capture and trial ==
In May 1991, Mossad, through information from a foreign source, identified Levinson as a spy. He was lured back to Israel from abroad and arrested at Ben-Gurion International Airport. During his interrogation, he made a full confession.

He was tried in the Tel Aviv District Court. The details of the trial were kept secret. During his trial, some of his friends from the military and security services, including Ariel Sharon and Rafi Eitan, testified on his behalf. He was found guilty and sentenced to 12 years in prison.

== Imprisonment and later life ==
Levinson served seven years of his twelve-year sentence, and was released in 1999 after a third of his sentence had been deducted for good behavior. While imprisoned, his cellmate was Marcus Klingberg, another convicted Soviet spy. While he was imprisoned, his wife left him, his friends and colleagues dissociated themselves from him, and he was expelled from various organizations that he had been a part of, including the IDF Veterans Association. Following his release, he was subjected to a stay of exit order that prevented him from leaving Israel until the end of his original sentence in 2003.

When Levinson was released, he rented an apartment in Jerusalem, and became socially secluded. When his stay of exit term expired, he moved to Thailand, where he found work as an agricultural consultant. He currently lives in Thailand, and only returns to Israel for brief visits.
