= Marcus Klingberg =

Israeli scientist and Soviet spy (1918–2015)

- מרקוס קלינגברג
- Marcus Klingberg, 2006
- Born: 7 October 1918; Warsaw, Kingdom of Poland
- Died: 30 November 2015 (aged 97); Paris, France
- Occupations: Epidemiologist, spy
- Spouse: Wanda Jasinska (Adjia Eisman)
- Children: Sylvia Klingberg (daughter)
- Relatives: Ian Brossat (grandson)
- Awards: Order of the Red Banner of Labour
- Military career
- Allegiance: Soviet Union (1941–1945); Israel (1948–1957)
- Rank: Captain (Red Army); Lieutenant colonel (IDF)

Avraham Mordechai Klingberg (7 October 1918 – 30 November 2015), known as Marek or Marcus Klingberg (Hebrew: מרקוס קלינגברג), was a Polish-born Israeli epidemiologist and the highest ranking Soviet spy ever uncovered in Israel. Klingberg made major contributions in the fields of infectious and noninfectious disease epidemiology and military medicine, while simultaneously passing intelligence to the Soviet Union regarding Israel's biological and chemical warfare capacities. Declared the "most important Soviet spy in Israel" by the Jerusalem Post, Klingberg is regarded as causing the greatest damage ever to the country's national security interests.

Originally from a family of rabbis, Klingberg chose a secular education in high school. Entering medical school in Warsaw in 1935, his studies were cut short by the German invasion in 1939. He fled Poland for the Soviet Union, completing his medical degree in Minsk and enlisting in the Red Army in 1941. Injured on the front lines, he was reassigned to a military unit dealing with disease outbreaks. In 1943, he served as Chief Epidemiologist of the Byelorussian Republic. Repatriated to Poland following the end of the war, he became Acting Chief Epidemiologist at the Polish Ministry of Health.

Having lost his entire family but a single cousin in the Holocaust, Klingberg migrated to Israel. He served in the Israel Defence Force between 1948 and 1953. In 1957 he was appointed Deputy Scientific Director of the clandestine Israel Institute for Biological Research (IIBR), responsible for the country's biological and chemical weapons. By his own admission, he began passing information to the Soviet Union due to ideological reasons. Despite coming under suspicion by counter-intelligence, his activities were not discovered until 1983, seven years after his retirement from the IIBR. Arrested and convicted of espionage in secret, he was sentenced to 20 years in prison, being held in solitary confinement for the first decade. While the circumstances of his detention were revealed internationally in 1988, domestic reporting on Klingberg was suppressed for a further five years. Paroled to home detention in 1998 due to ill health, he was permitted to move to Paris in 2003 to live with his daughter on the condition that he never speak of his work in the areas of biological and chemical weapons. The remaining years of his life were spent re-engaged in academic work and completing his memoirs.

== Early life ==
Klingberg was born in Warsaw, Poland, on 7 October 1918, to a Hasidic Jewish family of rabbinical lineage. In his youth, he lived for a time with his grandfather, Rabbi Moshe Chaim Klingberg. His parents sent him to a cheder, a religious primary school. As a teenager, he abandoned religion and attended a secular high school.

In 1935, Klingberg began studying medicine at the University of Warsaw. In 1939, with the German invasion of Poland, Klingberg fled to the Soviet Union at the urging of his father, completing his medical studies in Minsk in 1941. His parents and younger brother, who remained in Poland, were murdered in 1942 in the Treblinka extermination camp. Other than a single cousin, his entire family perished.

== World War II ==
On 22 June 1941, the day Germany invaded the Soviet Union, Klingberg volunteered for the Red Army. He served as a medical officer on the front lines until October 1941, when he was wounded in the leg by shrapnel. Upon recovery, he was assigned to Perm in the Urals as leader of an anti-epidemic unit.

In 1943, he undertook postgraduate studies in epidemiology at the Central Institute for Advanced Medical Training in Moscow under Lev Gromashevsky, considered the leading Soviet epidemiologist. The same year, he was part of a team that stopped an epidemic in the Urals. He also contributed to research on typhoid fever. In late December 1943, the first parts of Byelorussia were retaken by the Red Army and Klingberg became Chief Epidemiologist of the Byelorussian Republic.

At the end of the war, Klingberg was discharged from the Red Army with the rank of captain and returned to Poland. In Warsaw, he served as Acting Chief Epidemiologist at the Polish Ministry of Health.

While living in post-war Poland, Klingberg met Adjia Eisman, who went by the name Wanda Jasinska, a survivor of the Warsaw Ghetto. Similarly to Klingberg, her parents and siblings were murdered in the Holocaust. Klingberg and Jasinska married in 1946 and moved to Sweden, where their daughter, Sylvia, was born in 1947.

== Military and scientific career ==
In November 1948, Klingberg immigrated with his wife and daughter to Israel, during the closing stages of the War of Independence. Some sections of Shin Bet believed the immigration to have been prompted by Soviet intelligence, but Klingberg strongly denied this, saying he was motivated by the loss of his family in Poland during the Holocaust.

Upon arrival in Israel, he was drafted into the Israel Defense Forces, serving in the Medical Corps. In March 1950, he was promoted to the rank of lieutenant colonel (Sgan Aluf). He served as Head of the Department of Preventive Medicine, Office of the Surgeon General, and afterward founded and directed the Central Research Laboratories for Military Medicine. His work included some of the first research into West Nile fever.

In 1957, he was one of the founders of the top-secret Israel Institute for Biological Research in Ness Ziona, where he served as Deputy Scientific Director until 1972. He was responsible for bringing Ludwik Fleck to the Institute in 1957. In 1969, Klingberg joined the Faculty of Medicine, Tel Aviv University, where he was Professor of Epidemiology and Head of the Department of Preventive and Social Medicine from 1978 to 1983.

Klingberg's academic career and research papers earned him an international reputation in his field, and he was invited to conferences by the World Health Organization. He was president of the European Teratology Society (1980–1982) and a co-founder and chairman (1979–1981) of the International Clearinghouse for Birth Defects Monitoring Systems (ICBDMS). In 1976, he was elected chair of an international advisory committee established by the Italian government to study the effects of the Seveso Accident. He was elected to the council of the International Epidemiological Association for the 1981–1984 term.

Klingberg conducted sabbaticals at the Henry Phipps Institute, University of Pennsylvania (1962 to 1964); at the Norwegian Institute of Public Health (1972); at the Department of Medical Statistics and Epidemiology, London School of Hygiene and Tropical Medicine (1973); and at the Department of Social and Community Medicine, University of Oxford. He became a Visiting Fellow of Wolfson College, Oxford in 1978.

== Espionage activities ==
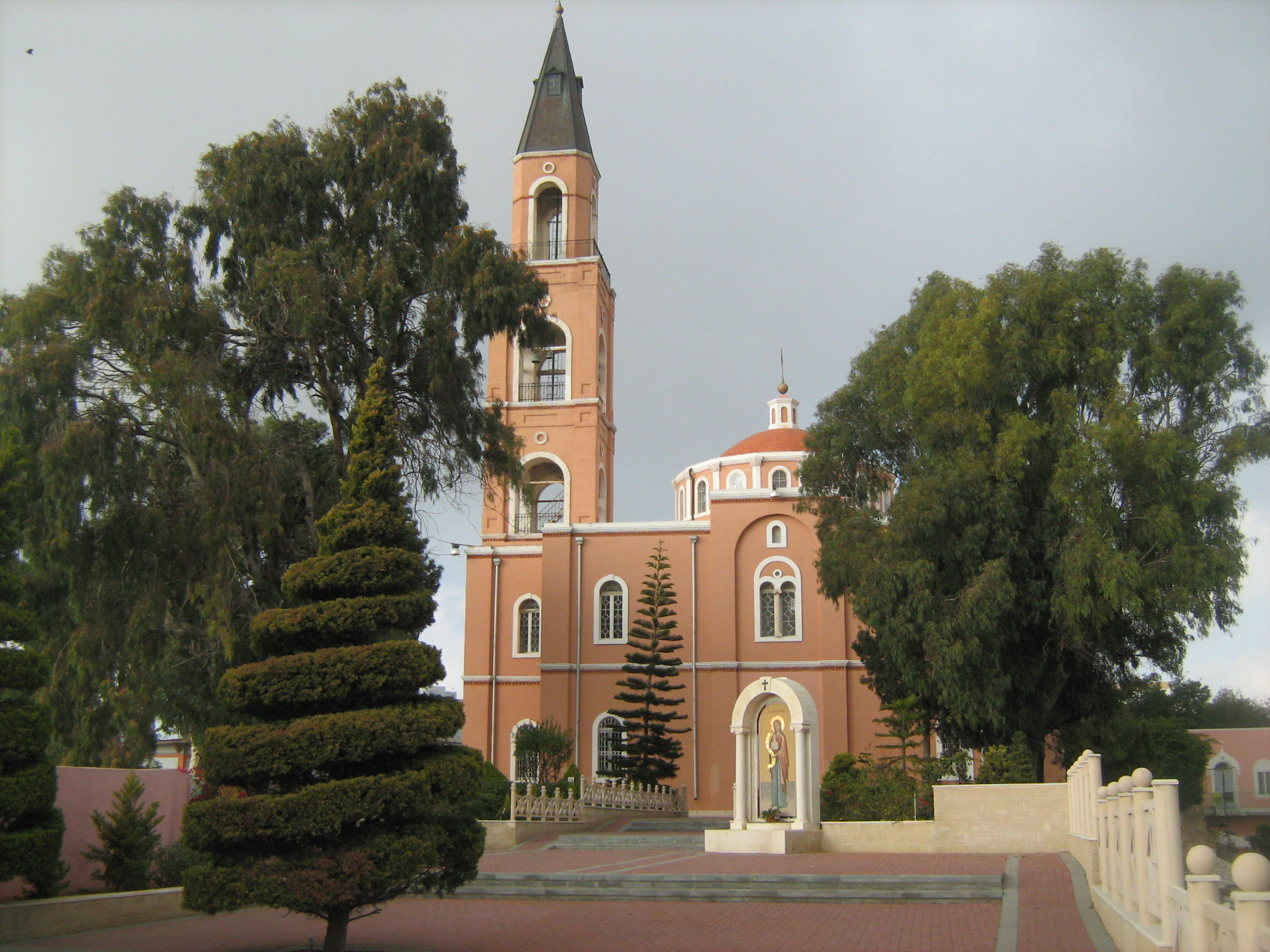
The Russian Orthodox Church in Abu Kabir, southern Tel Aviv, where Klingberg would meet his KGB handlers.

According to Klingberg's indictment, which was based on his confession, he began spying in 1957, although in his memoirs he indicates the date was actually 1950. Klingberg passed information on Israel's chemical and biological weapons research, frequently using the Russian Orthodox Church in Abu Kabir as his contact point with the KGB. In the 1950s, Klingberg was secretly awarded the Order of the Red Banner of Labour, at the time the Soviet Union's second highest honour, in recognition of his services. Klingberg has indicated that sometime around the mid-1950s he considered ceasing to pass information to the Soviets, but he concluded that the relationship would become coercive and that he preferred to "maintain voluntary relations."

Klingberg confided in his espionage activities with his wife and she collaborated with him in passing intelligence to the Soviets, including personally handling what Klingberg termed a "particularly virulent strain of bacteria." Interrogated following her husband's arrest in 1983, Jasinska never admitted involvement in spying.

Israeli journalists Isabella Ginor and Gideon Remez have suggested that Klingberg's intelligence on Israeli offensive capabilities led the Soviet Union to provide Egypt with chemical and biological defensive capabilities in the lead up to the Six-Day War in 1967. Martin McCauley, a specialist in the Soviet Union and Eastern Europe, has said the Soviets may have passed Klingberg's information to multiple Arab countries.

Israel's foreign and domestic intelligence agencies, Mossad and Shin Bet, began to suspect Klingberg of espionage in the 1960s, but shadowing brought no results. While at the Institute for Biological Research, he was twice summoned by the authorities due to suspicions of being a foreign agent. Klingberg refuted these claims. In 1965, he passed a polygraph test, according to Israeli journalist Yossi Melman, due to the fact that his interrogators simply asked the wrong questions, as they suspected he was spying for Polish rather than Soviet intelligence.

Klingberg retired from the Israel Institute for Biological Research in 1976, and contact with Soviet intelligence lapsed.

== Capture, trial and detention ==
In 1972, a newly arrived Jewish migrant from the Soviet Union admitted to working for the KGB during Shin Bet screening, and he became a double agent for the agency. In 1982, when the KGB instructed this agent to reestablish contact with Klingberg, Shin Bet acquired circumstantial evidence of Klingberg's links to Soviet intelligence. However, the evidence was not considered strong enough to secure a conviction of espionage. An operation codenamed "Reef" was planned to obtain a confession.

In January 1983, Shin Bet officers informed Klingberg they wanted to send him to Southeast Asia, where a chemical plant had allegedly exploded. After leaving home with his suitcase, he was taken to an apartment in an undisclosed location and detained. Initially denying any wrongdoing, he was interrogated harshly and, by his own account, he attempted suicide three times. After ten days, Klingberg admitted to passing intelligence to the Soviets and signed a confession indicating he had been blackmailed into spying. He told his interrogators that he had not completed his medical studies and lacked a diploma, and that the KGB had threatened to expose this.

Klingberg was tried in secret and sentenced to 20 years in prison. For the first 10 years of his sentence, he was held in solitary confinement in a high-security prison in Ashkelon under a false identity as a publisher named Abraham Grinberg. After he was removed from solitary confinement, his cellmate was Shimon Levinson, another Israeli who spied for the Soviet Union.

Klingberg's daughter emigrated to France in the 1970s and, upon learning of her father's imprisonment, privately campaigned to have his prison conditions improved. She enlisted the support of French lawyer Antoine Comte in Paris, who engaged Wolfgang Vogel in East Berlin in an attempt to have Klingberg released via support from East Germany and the Soviet Union. In 1988–89, East Germany and the Soviet Union began negotiations with Israel, where a proposal was tentatively agreed to release Klingberg, along with Shabtai Kalmanovich, in exchange for the Soviet Union providing information on the location of Ron Arad, an Israeli Air Force navigator believed to be held in Lebanon. With the downfall of communism in Eastern Europe, the deal fell apart.

Due to the investigations of British journalist Peter Pringle, Israeli authorities acknowledged Klingberg's conviction and imprisonment in 1988. Reporting of his circumstances inside Israel remained prohibited.

In 1997, Amnesty International appealed to the Israeli government to release Klingberg on medical grounds as he had had several strokes. During his application for early release, former Shin Bet director Yaakov Peri acted as a character witness. In September 1998, he was granted leave from prison but subjected to house arrest.

At his expense, a camera connected to the offices of the Director of Security of the Defense Establishment (MALMAB) was installed in his apartment. His telephone was tapped with his knowledge. Guards from MALMAB were assigned to him and Klingberg had to pay their salaries. Klingberg signed a commitment not to speak about his work. In 1999, a court ordered him to cease speaking Yiddish and Russian at home as the guards could not understand those languages and therefore could not monitor his conversations. In order to pay for the guards and the camera, Klingberg took loans and eventually had to sell his apartment.

== Release and later life ==
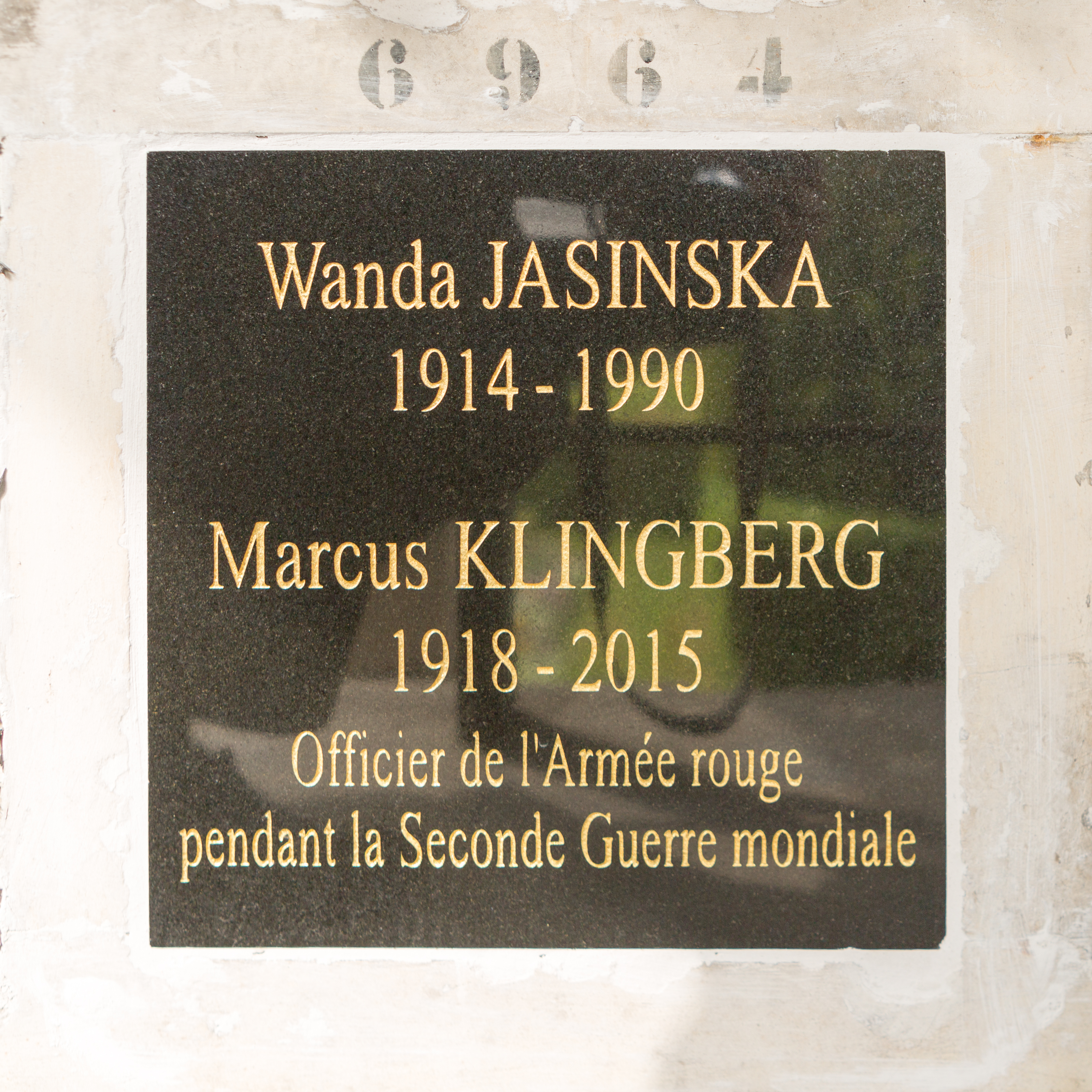
Memorial of Klingberg and his wife, Wanda, at the columbarium in Père-Lachaise, Paris. The inscription reads: "Officer of the Red Army during the Second World War."

In January 2003, Klingberg was released from house arrest and immediately left Israel for Paris to be with his daughter Sylvia and grandson Ian Brossat. Klingberg moved to a one-room apartment in Paris but did not take French citizenship. He frequently lectured on medicine at universities. In honour of his friendship with Ludwik Fleck, he helped established a center in Fleck's name and delivered the opening lecture at the Collegium Helveticum, a multi-university institute in Zürich promoting interdisciplinary research. He received an officer's pension from the Israeli government, which amounted to around €2,000 a month. Klingberg continued to have medical problems and was frequently hospitalized.

Klingberg's memoirs, HaMeragel Ha'akharon ("The Last Spy"), written with his lawyer, Michael Sfard, were published in 2007. The book was received harshly in Israel, with reviewers from Haaretz and Ynet calling him, respectively, "a childish and pitiful person" and "a scoundrel".

Interviewed in 2008, Klingberg maintained that he had spied out of ideological reasons, but had lied to his interrogators as he believed claiming to have been blackmailed would result in lighter treatment. When asked why he spied for the Soviet Union, Klingberg stated, "I felt it was the right thing to do ... Because of the Cold War. I wanted the two blocs in the Cold War to be the same thing, out of a desire for a more balanced world." In a 2014 interview, Klingberg noted he felt he owed the Soviet Union a debt for saving the world from the Nazis. He said he had always been a communist and had recruited his wife and two friends.

Klingberg's spying and imprisonment affected the life of his grandson, Ian Brossat, a politician elected to the French Senate in September 2023. During his early childhood, he did not know Klingberg was in jail, believing him to be in hospital; later, he was never allowed to speak of his grandfather's imprisonment. In 2009, when he won a seat on the Council of Paris, Brossat noted how his political opponents attempted to tarnish him by association with Klingberg. Klingberg, towards the end of his life, said he was proud of his grandson.

== Death ==
Klingberg died in Paris on 30 November 2015, aged 97, with his death covered in many of the world's newspapers of record. (Note: Examples include: The New York Times, The Daily Telegraph, The Guardian, Le Figaro and Haaretz.) He was cremated and his ashes interred in Père Lachaise Cemetery next to those of his wife, who had died of heart failure in 1990.

Following his death, Yaakov Peri named Klingberg as, "one of the top Soviet spies in Israel – if not the greatest one ever." The Jerusalem Post called him, "the most important spy that the Soviets employed in Israel."
