= MigVax-101 =

Vaccine candidate against COVID-19

Vaccine description
- Target: SARS-CoV-2
- Vaccine type: Virus-like particles

Clinical data
- Routes of administration: Oral

MigVax-101 is a COVID-19 vaccine candidate developed by Oravax Medical.
