= Embassy of Israel, Athens =

Coordinates: 37°59′55″N 23°46′09″E

Embassy of Israel in Athens
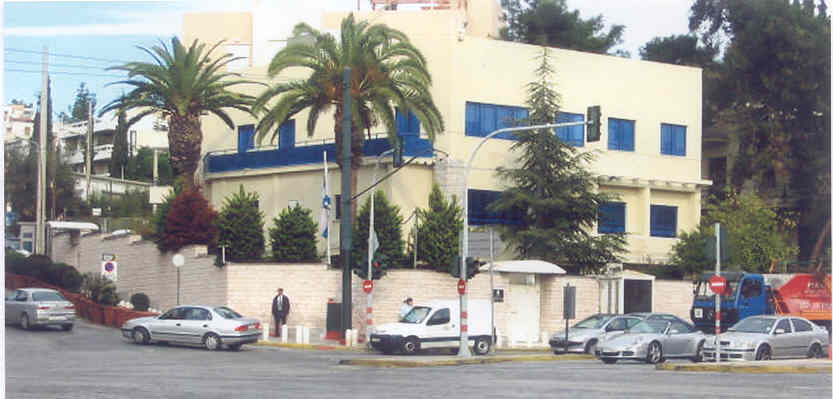
- Location: Athens
- Address: 1 Marathonodromon Street
- Ambassador: Noam Katz

The Israeli Embassy to Greece is the site of a diplomatic mission of Israel, situated at 1 Marathonodromon Street (consular entrance at Mouson street) in Psychiko, Athens.

== History ==
The Israeli Embassy in Athens represents one of 98 consular and diplomatic representations of Israel all over the world. The building hosts both the Embassy of Israel and the Israeli Consulate.

The Embassy of Israel was initially located on Herodotou St, as a Diplomatic Representation, immediately following the establishment of the State of Israel. It later moved to Koumbari St. Today, it is located in a building that was initially constructed as a private residence in 1930. In the 1970s the building was purchased by the Jewish community of Salonika which offered it to the State of Israel in 1975 to house the Diplomatic Representation.

Following the Greek Government's de jure recognition of the State of Israel in May 1990, the Diplomatic Representation was upgraded to an embassy.

The embassy was closed on 9 March 2020 for two weeks after an employee was diagnosed with coronavirus disease 2019.

In 2007, the embassy underwent extensive renovations.

As of 21 May 2024, the current Ambassador is Noam Katz.

== See also ==
- Foreign relations of Israel
