= Israel and weapons of mass destruction =

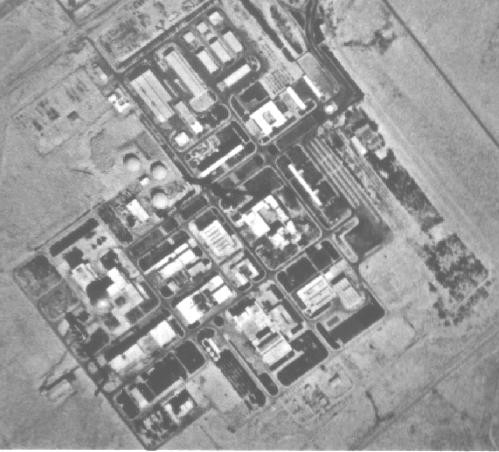
The Shimon Peres Negev Nuclear Research Center, commonly known as the Dimona reactor, Israel's site for producing plutonium for its nuclear weapons.

Israel is the only country in the Middle East that is believed to possess nuclear weapons. Israel is also suspected to possess chemical and biological weapons. Israel is the only United Nations member not party to the Treaty on the Non-Proliferation of Nuclear Weapons, the Biological Weapons Convention, or the Chemical Weapons Convention, although it signed the latter in 1993.

Israel's stockpile is estimated at 90 to 400 nuclear weapons. It is speculated to operate a nuclear triad of delivery options: by over 200 F-16 and F-15I fighters, (Note: F-16 and F-15I squadrons are both speculated to be assigned nuclear roles, while it is also speculated the F-35I has a nuclear capability.) by submarine-launched cruise missiles aboard five Dolphin-class submarines, and by 25 to 50 Jericho medium and intercontinental range ballistic missiles. (Note: The exact range of Jericho III missile is unclear, estimated from 4,000 km to over 5,500 km, while an intercontinental range is over 5,500 km. The Jericho II missile is believed to have an medium range of 1,500 km.) Its first deliverable nuclear weapon is estimated to have been completed in late 1966 or early 1967, which would make it the sixth nuclear-armed country.

Israel maintains a policy of deliberate ambiguity, choosing not to formally deny or admit the extent of its nuclear, chemical, and biological warfare capabilities; it is the only nuclear-armed country to do so. Israeli officials have instead historically repeated "Israel will not be the first country to introduce nuclear weapons to the Middle East". Israel interprets "introduce" to mean it will not test or formally acknowledge its nuclear arsenal. Nonetheless, Israel is suspected of carrying out a 1979 covert nuclear test responsible for the Vela incident, as part of its collaboration with the South African nuclear weapons program. Western governments, including the United States, similarly do not acknowledge the Israeli capacity. Israeli officials, including prime ministers, have made statements that seemed to imply that Israel possesses nuclear weapons, including discussions of use in the Gaza war.

Citing security threats, Israel rejects international calls to accede to the Treaty on the Non-Proliferation of Nuclear Weapons or to participate in negotiations of a Middle East weapons of mass destruction free zone. Israel's Begin Doctrine describes its pre-emptive strikes against nuclear facilities of other Middle Eastern countries, bombing an Iraqi reactor in 1981, and a Syrian reactor in 2007. Israel has extensively targeted Iran's nuclear program, using malware, assassinations, and airstrikes on reactors, enrichment sites, and other nuclear facilities during their 2025 war.

Israel has not signed the Treaty on the Non-Proliferation of Nuclear Weapons (NPT), despite United Nations General Assembly pressure to do so. It argues that nuclear controls cannot be implemented in isolation of other security issues and that only following the establishment of peaceful relations of all countries in the region could controls be introduced via negotiation of "a mutually and effectively verifiable regime that [would] establish the Middle East as a zone free of chemical, biological, and nuclear weapons, as well as ballistic missiles".

Israel is generally reported as having undeclared chemical warfare capabilities, including nerve agents, and an offensive biological warfare program. The primary suspected facility is the Israel Institute for Biological Research (IIBR), which also engages in defensive work. Israel carried out biological warfare in Operation Cast Thy Bread, dispersing the pathogen for typhoid against Palestinian civilian populations during the 1948 Palestine war. In 1992, an Israeli cargo aircraft, carrying a shipment bound for IIBR, crashed into an apartment complex in Amsterdam, Netherlands. The health effects in survivors, and eventual revelations of the cargo manifest, showed at least three chemical precursors used in the production the nerve agents sarin and soman. Israel's uses of white phosphorus and tear gas have also been alleged to violate the Chemical Weapons Convention.

== Terminology ==
The collective acronym used in Israel for "atomic, biological, and chemical" weapons is the Hebrew acronym: Aleph–Bet–Kaph (Hebrew: אב"כ or אב״ך for Hebrew: אטומית ביולוגית כימית, lit. 'Atomic Biological Chemical'). (Note: The Hebrew acronym אב״כ Aleph Betַ Kaph can also be written אב״ך with the terminal form of the latter Kaph, and the Gershayim is usually substituted with a double apostrophe or double quote mark.)

== Nuclear weapons ==
It is believed that Israel possessed an operational nuclear weapons capability by 1967, with the mass production of nuclear warheads occurring immediately after the Six-Day War. Experts estimated the stockpile of Israeli nuclear weapons range from 60 to as many as 400. It is unknown if Israel's reported thermonuclear weapons are in the megaton range. Israel is also reported to possess a wide range of different systems, including neutron bombs, tactical nuclear weapons, and suitcase nukes. Israel is believed to manufacture its nuclear weapons at the Negev Nuclear Research Center.

In 2021, Palestine made a declaration to the UN under the Treaty on the Prohibition of Nuclear Weapons that it had never hosted nuclear weapons to its knowledge, and saying Israel, as the occupying power, bore responsibility for any unlawful nuclear activities in the occupied Palestinian territories.

On 5 November 2023, amid the Gaza war, Heritage Minister Amihai Eliyahu stated that the use of atomic weapons in the Israeli invasion of the Gaza Strip could be "one of the possibilities". He was neither a member the security cabinet nor of the war cabinet, and was subsequently suspended from cabinet meetings.

=== Nuclear weapons delivery ===
Nuclear weapons delivery mechanisms include Jericho 3 missiles, with a range of 4,800 km to 6,500 km (though a 2004 source estimated its range at up to 11,500 km), and which are believed to provide a second-strike option, as well as regional coverage from road mobile Jericho 2 IRBMs. Israel's nuclear-capable ballistic missiles are believed to be buried so far underground that they would survive a nuclear attack. Additionally, Israel is believed to have an offshore nuclear second-strike capability, using submarine-launched nuclear-capable cruise missiles, which can be launched from the Israeli Navy's Dolphin-class submarines. The Israeli Air Force has F-15I and F-16I Sufa fighter aircraft which are capable of delivering tactical and strategic nuclear weapons at long distances using conformal fuel tanks and supported by their aerial refueling fleet of modified Boeing 707s.

In 2006, then Israeli Prime Minister Ehud Olmert appeared to acknowledge that Israel had nuclear weapons when he stated on German TV that Iran was "aspiring to have nuclear weapons as America, France, Israel, Russia". This admission was in contrast to the long-running Israeli government policy of deliberate ambiguity on whether it has nuclear weapons. The policy held that Israel would "not be the first to introduce nuclear weapons in the Middle East." Former International Atomic Energy Agency Director General Mohamed ElBaradei regarded Israel as a state possessing nuclear weapons. Much of what is known about Israel's nuclear program comes from revelations in 1986 by Mordechai Vanunu, a technician at the Negev Nuclear Research Center who served an 18-year prison sentence as a result. Israel has not signed the Treaty on the Non-Proliferation of Nuclear Weapons, but supports establishment of a Middle East Zone free of weapons of mass destruction.

=== Threats during the Gaza war ===
During the Gaza war, Israeli and US officials have made statements about nuclear weapons and Gaza characterized as genocidal intent. Israeli security analysts have also argued these statements undermine Israeli nuclear ambiguity.

On 9 October 2023, Likud member of the Knesset Tally Gotliv made a Twitter post calling for a nuclear-armed Jericho missile "strategic alert" and the use of a "doomsday weapon". She continued that "Only an explosion that shakes the Middle East will restore this country’s dignity, strength and security!".

Minister of Heritage Amihai Eliyahu responded "That's one way." to an interviewer asking if Israel should drop "some kind of atomic bomb" on Gaza "to kill everyone”. His remarks were criticized by the Israeli opposition, a number of Arab countries, Iran, and China. Palestinian foreign minister Riyad al-Maliki filed a complaint with the International Atomic Energy Agency arguing the statement was "an official recognition that Israel possesses nuclear weapons and weapons of mass destruction". Eliyahu was ostensibly suspended from the Israeli cabinet by Israeli prime minister Benjamin Netanyahu, but continued to participate in meetings by phone. Eliyahu's father Shmuel Eliyahu, the Chief Rabbi of the city of Safed, repeated the statement: "A nuclear bomb on Gaza is indeed an option!"

US Republican congressmen Lindsey Graham, Tim Walberg, and Randy Fine were criticized for referring to the atomic bombings of Hiroshima and Nagasaki to support the Israeli bombing of the Gaza Strip.

Nuclear weapons scholar Vincent Intondi argued that US and Israeli officials' statements are liable to prosecution under the Genocide Convention's incitement clause, but the convention obligates countries to prosecute incitement within their own borders.

== Chemical weapons ==
PDF file of the CIA report as described. This version is partially complete, showing only the relevant passages on Israel.

Israel has signed but not ratified the Chemical Weapons Convention (CWC). A 1983 CIA report concluded Israel likely has "persistent and nonpersistent nerve agents, a mustard agent, and several riot-control agents". The Israel Institute for Biological Research and a facility near Dimona are suspected Israeli chemical weapons sites.

In 1993, the U.S. Congress Office of Technology Assessment weapons of mass destruction proliferation assessment recorded Israel as a country generally reported as having undeclared offensive chemical warfare capabilities. Former US deputy assistant secretary of defense responsible for chemical and biological defense Dr. Bill Richardson said in 1998 "I have no doubt that Israel has worked on both chemical and biological offensive things for a long time... There's no doubt they've had stuff for years".

=== Possible nerve agents ===
In 1983 a report by the CIA stated that Israel, after "finding itself surrounded by frontline Arab states with budding CW capabilities, became increasingly conscious of its vulnerability to chemical attack... undertook a program of chemical warfare preparations in both offensive and protective areas... several indicators lead us to believe that they have available to them at least persistent and nonpersistent nerve agents, a mustard agent, and several riot-control agents matched with suitable delivery systems... possible tests were detected in 1976. In late 1982 a probable CW nerve agent production facility and a storage facility were identified at the Dimona Sensitive Storage Area in the Negev Desert. Other CW agent production is believed to exist within a well-developed Israeli chemical industry".

There are also speculations that a chemical weapons program might be located at the Israel Institute for Biological Research (IIBR) in Ness Ziona.

==== 1992 El Al aircraft crash ====
In 1992, a cargo aircraft bound for Tel Aviv crashed into an apartment complex in Amsterdam, Netherlands. The subsequent health effects in survivors, and eventual revelations of the cargo manifest, showed at least three chemical precursors used in the production the nerve agents sarin and soman.

El Al Flight 1862 was flying from John F. Kennedy International Airport to Ben Gurion Airport via Amsterdam Airport Schiphol. In 1998, El Al spokesman Nachman Klieman publicly revealed the aircraft was carrying 190 liters of dimethyl methylphosphonate (DMMP), later a Schedule 2 chemical under the 1993 Chemical Weapons Convention, that can be used to produce nerve agents including sarin and soman. According to Jean Pascal Zanders, a European Union Institute for Security Studies scholar, DMMP was one of three sarin precursors on board, and sarin requires four precursors. The shipment was from a U.S. chemical plant to the Israel Institute for Biological Research under a U.S. Department of Commerce license, in accordance with international regulations at the time.

Israel claimed that the material was nontoxic, and its intended use was to test the filters of chemical weapon detectors. The Dutch foreign ministry confirmed that it had already known about the presence of chemicals on the aircraft. A lawyer for El Al working in The Hague, Robert Polak, told the Dutch government that Israel would not be forthcoming with information due to "state security reasons." According to the chemical weapons website CWInfo, the quantity involved was "too small for the preparation of a militarily useful quantity of sarin, but would be consistent with making small quantities for testing detection methods and protective clothing." Israeli-American non-proliferation scholar Avner Cohen argued that Israel attempted a coverup which instead drew fresh attention to the Israeli Institute for Biological Research.

=== Use of white phosphorus munitions ===
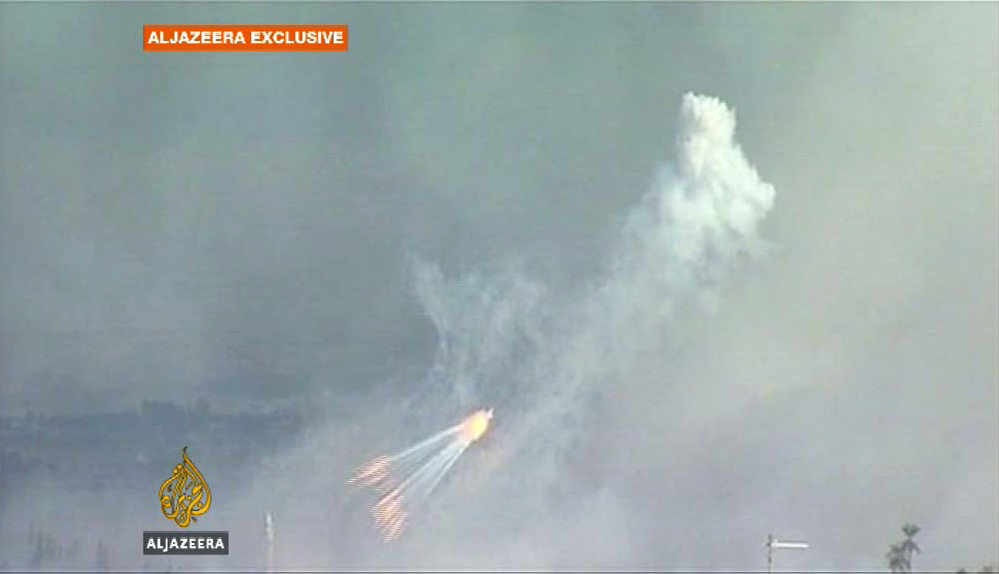
An Israeli white phosphorus munition explodes over Gaza, 2009.

White phosphorus munitions are typically considered an incendiary weapon or smoke agent, and are not listed under the schedules of substances of the 1993 Chemical Weapons Convention. However, in 2005, the Organisation for the Prohibition of Chemical Weapons (OPCW) spokesperson stated that white phosphorus munitions are prohibited under the convention if they have been intentionally used for their caustic properties. Palestine has alleged that Israeli has violated the Chemical Weapons Convention by using white phosphorus.

In the 2008–2009 Gaza War, various human rights groups reported that Israel used white phosphorus munitions against the populated areas in the Palestinian territory of the Gaza Strip. In July 2009 Israel admitted it had used white phosphorus during the war but not as an anti-personnel weapon.

In the 2014 Gaza War, Human Rights Watch noted that Israel apparently did not use white phosphorus due to previous international criticism.

In October 2023, at the start of the Gaza war, Human Rights Watch verified that Israel used white phosphorus in Gaza City. On 1 December 2023, Palestine gave a statement to the OPCW, calling for an investigation into Israeli white phosphorus use in Gaza as a violation of the CWC, and criticizing Israel for benefitting from its status as a CWC signatory while refusing to ratify the treaty.

Israel also used white phosphorus in southern Lebanon during the Israel–Hezbollah conflict, injuring 173 people between October 2023 and June 2024 according to Human Rights Watch.

==== Cultural impact ====
Israeli use of white phosphorus has been an influence in Palestinian art, including cinema, drawings, and poems, as well as international artwork, such as an exhibition by Forensic Architecture.

=== Use of tear gas ===
Under the Chemical Weapons Convention, tear gases, formally called riot control agents, are considered chemical weapons and violate the treaty when used as a "method of warfare". Israeli forces have used tear gas against Palestinians, including in the First Intifada, Second Intifada, and 2021 Israel–Palestine crisis. In July 2025, Palestine alleged in a statement to the OPCW that Israel had violated the convention by using riot control agents as a method of warfare.

== Biological weapons ==
Israel is suspected to have developed an offensive biological warfare capability, per the U.S. Congress Office of Technology Assessment. Israel is not a signatory to the Biological Weapons Convention. It is assumed that the Israel Institute for Biological Research in Ness Ziona develops vaccines and antidotes for chemical and biological warfare. It is speculated that Israel retains an active ability to produce and disseminate biological weapons, likely as a result of its extremely complex biodefense program. Israel has taken steps to strengthen its export control regulations on dual-use biotechnologies.

The Israeli intelligence agency Mossad is alleged to have assassinated the Palestinian militant Wadie Haddad using a toxin, either laced in his toothpaste or chocolate.

In 2025, Palestine cited its occupation by Israel as preventing full compliance with its 2018 ratification of the Biological Weapons Convention. In a statement to a UN working group on strengthening the convention, its mission wrote "we cannot guarantee whether any biological weapons, agents, or facilities exist or are produced on our land, including in illegal settlements, nor can we ensure effective customs control over such agents or their potential use by armed settlers."

=== Biological warfare in the 1948 Palestine War ===
Operation Cast Thy Bread was a top-secret biological warfare operation conducted by the Haganah and later the Israel Defense Forces that began in April 1948, during the 1948 Palestine war. The Haganah used typhoid bacteria to contaminate drinking water wells in violation of the 1925 Geneva Protocol. Its objective was to frighten and prevent Palestinian Arabs from returning to their captured villages and to make conditions difficult for Arab armies attempting to retake territories. The operation resulted in severe illness among local Palestinian citizens. In the final months of the war, the government of Israel gave orders to expand the biological warfare campaign into neighboring Arab states such as Egypt, Lebanon, and Syria, but they were not carried out. Israeli prime minister David Ben-Gurion and IDF chief of general staff Yigael Yadin oversaw and approved the use of biological warfare.

== Pre-state militants ==
After the declaration of independence, the members of the various pre-state militant groups mostly joined the IDF, including the controversial Lehi militant group. The Lehi militant who built the bombs for Operation Samson in 1947, the intended suicide attack in Jerusalem Central Prison in 1947, later had a leadership role in the Israeli military's nuclear, chemical, and biological weapons division (Hebrew: אב״כ). He originally enlisted using his girlfriend's surname. Much of his work was purely defensive, such as the development of gas masks, but even that was conducted in great secrecy.
