= BriLife =

Vaccine candidate against COVID-19

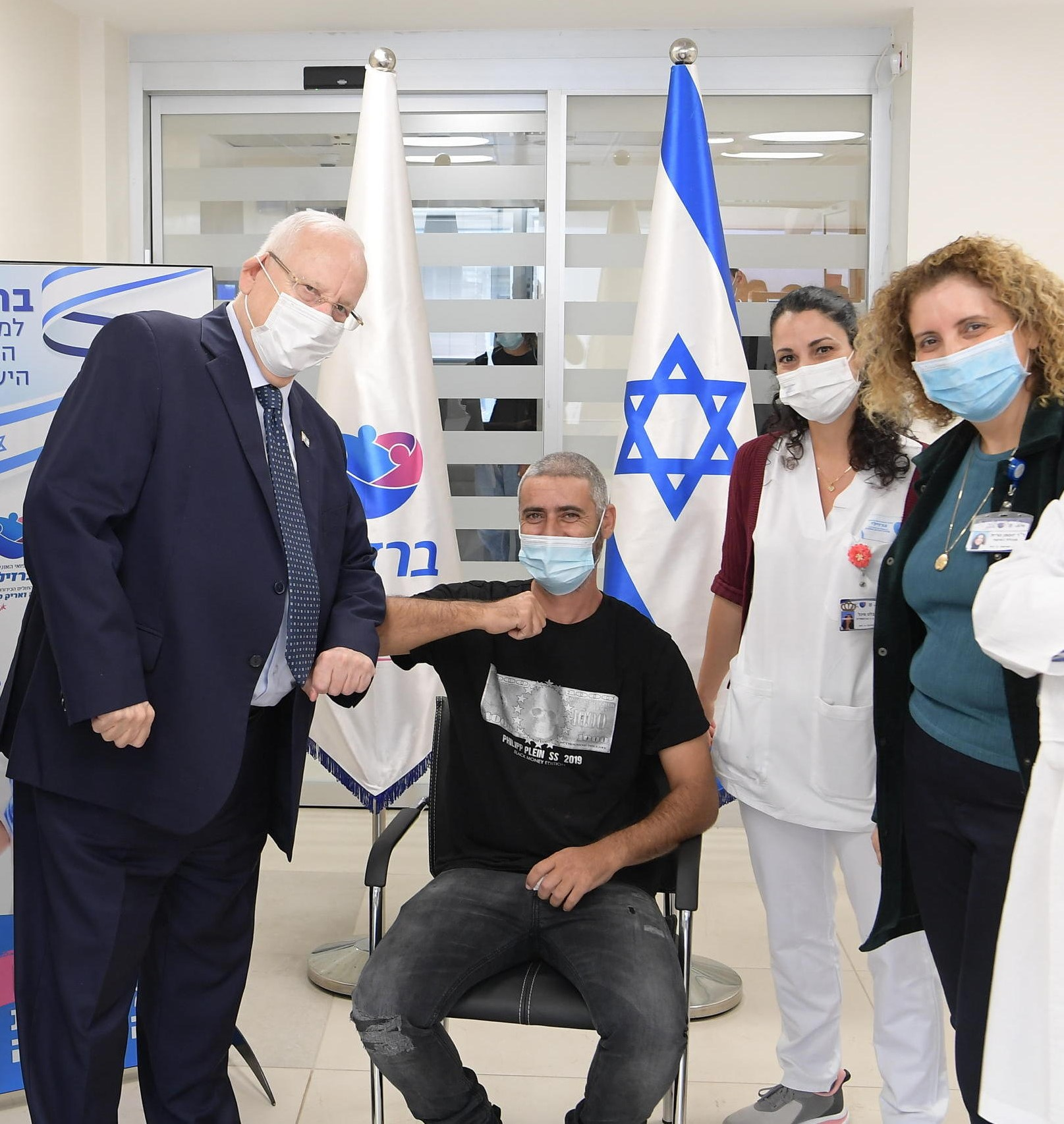
- The former President of Israel, Reuven Rivlin, with the first vaccinator in Phase B of the IIBR-100 vaccine of the Israel Institute for Biological Research, at the Barzilai Medical Center.

Vaccine description
- Target: SARS-CoV-2
- Vaccine type: Viral vector

Clinical data
- Other names: Brilife
- Routes of administration: Intramuscular
- ATC code: None

Identifiers
- CAS Number: 2699603-14-8

BriLife, also known as IIBR-100, is a replication-competent recombinant VSV viral vectored COVID-19 vaccine candidate. It was developed by the Israel Institute for Biological Research (IIBR). The IIBR partnered with the US-based NRx Pharmaceuticals to complete clinical trials and commercialize the vaccine. A study conducted in hamsters suggested that one dose of the vaccine was safe and effective at protecting against COVID-19.
