= Israel Institute for Biological Research =

Israeli research and development laboratory

Coordinates: 31°55′28.85″N 34°47′29.97″E

Israel Institute for Biological Research (IIBR) is an Israeli research and development laboratory. It is under the jurisdiction of the Prime Minister's Office that works in close cooperation with Israeli government agencies. IIBR has many public projects on which it works with international research organizations (governmental and non-governmental) and universities. It has approximately 350 employees, 150 of whom are scientists. Its research findings are often published in national and international scientific publications. Some reports claim it may be involved in the manufacturing of biological and chemical weapons. In 2020, IIBR started developing a COVID-19 vaccine named "Brilife".

== History ==
IIBR originated with Hemed Bet, the Haganah biological warfare unit, which Alexander Kenyan, then a microbiology student, established in Jaffa in February 1948, shortly before Israeli independence, at the direction of Yigael Yadin, the Haganah's chief operations officer. Ephraim Katzir was Hemed Bet's first commander.

The institute in its current form was founded in 1952, after Hemed Bet relocated to an orange grove near Ness Ziona. It was founded partly in a former Palestinian mansion of Wadi Hunayn. Among the founders were Professor Ernst David Bergmann, Prime Minister David Ben-Gurion's science adviser and the head of R&D at the Ministry of Defense. Keynan was IIBR's first director.

Some of the fields in which IIBR conducts research include:

- Medical diagnostic techniques
- Mechanisms of pathogenic diseases
- Vaccines and pharmaceuticals
- Protein and enzyme synthesis and engineering
- Process biotechnology
- Air pollution risk assessment
- Environmental detectors and biosensors

The institute is widely suspected of being involved in developing chemical and biological weapons. It is also assumed that the Institute develops vaccines and antidotes for such weapons. While refusing to confirm it, Israel is widely suspected of having developed offensive biological and chemical weapons capabilities, and the Israeli intelligence service Mossad is known to have used biological weapons in assassination missions. Israel has not signed the Biological Weapons Convention and has signed but not ratified the Chemical Weapons Convention.

Marcus Klingberg, the highest-ranking spy for the Soviet Union ever caught in Israel, served as the IIBR's Deputy Scientific Director. He had joined the IIBR in 1957 and served as Deputy Scientific Director until 1972 as well as Head of the Department of Epidemiology until 1978. He was arrested in 1983 and convicted of espionage. His arrest and sentencing was kept a secret for over a decade.

El Al Flight 1862, which crashed in the Netherlands in 1992, was carrying cargo destined for the Israel Institute for Biological Research which included 190 litres of dimethyl methylphosphonate, which (among many other uses) could be used in the synthesis of Sarin nerve gas, and is now a Chemical Weapons Convention schedule 2 chemical. Israel stated that the material was non-toxic, was to have been used to test filters that protect against chemical weapons, and that it had been listed on the cargo manifest in accordance with international regulations. The Dutch foreign ministry confirmed that it had already known about the presence of chemicals on the aircraft. According to the chemical weapons site CWInfo the quantity involved was "too small for the preparation of a militarily useful quantity of Sarin, but would be consistent with making small quantities for testing detection methods and protective clothing".

According to British intelligence writer Gordon Thomas, the facility is surrounded by a high concrete wall topped with sensors, and armed guards patrol its perimeter. No aircraft are allowed to overfly the facility, and it does not appear on any map or telephone directory of the area. Inside the facility, code words and visual identification control access to each area, and there are numerous bombproof sliding doors that can only be opened by swipe cards whose codes are changed every day. Corridors inside the facility are patrolled by guards. Many of the research facilities are deep underground. All employees and their families undergo intense health checks every month.

== Life Science Research Israel ==
Life Science Research Israel (LSRI), a subsidiary of IIBR, is dedicated to the commercial exploitation of innovative technologies developed by IIBR. According to its 2000 annual report, the 2000 budget was 16.6 million NIS (about US$4 million), with revenues of 12.9 million NIS (US$3 million).
