= Samson Option =

Israel's deterrence strategy of massive retaliation with nuclear weapons

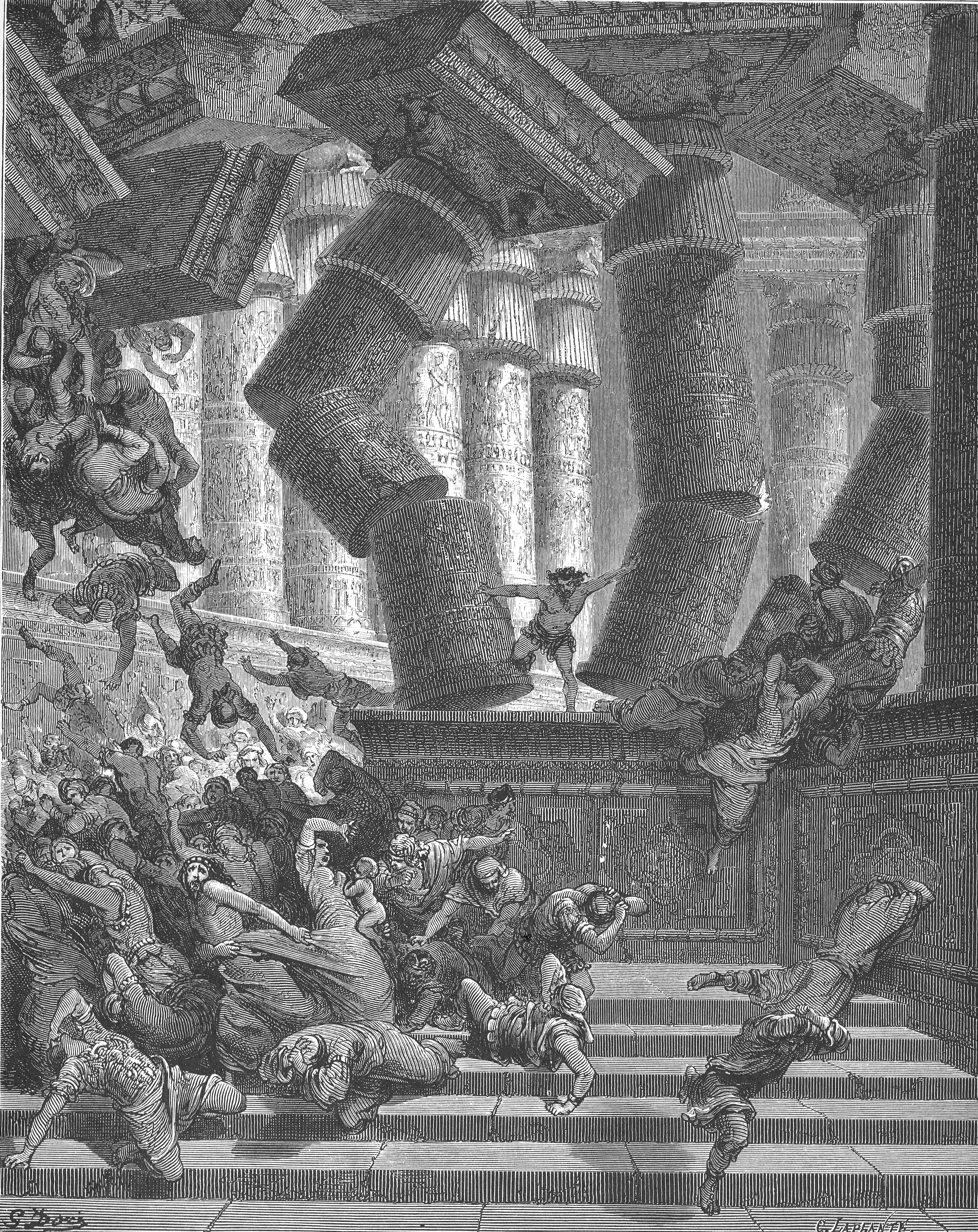
According to the biblical narrative, Samson died when he grasped two pillars of the Temple of Dagon, and "bowed himself with all his might" (Judges 16:30, KJV).

The Samson Option (Hebrew: ברירת שמשון, romanized: b'rerat shimshon) is a deterrence strategy of massive retaliation with nuclear weapons as a "last resort" against any country whose military has invaded and/or destroyed much of Israel. The term was popularized by Seymour Hersh's 1991 book, The Samson Option: Israel's Nuclear Arsenal and American Foreign Policy. Commentators also have employed the term to refer to situations where non-nuclear, non-Israeli actors have threatened conventional weapons retaliation.

The name is a reference to the biblical Israelite judge Samson, who is said to have pushed apart the pillars of a Philistine temple, bringing down the roof and killing himself and thousands of Philistines who had captured him.

== Background ==
When the Lehi militant group were discussing ways to assassinate General Evelyn Barker, the British Army commander in Mandatory Palestine, a young woman volunteered to do the assassination as a suicide bombing. She said "Let my soul die with the Philistines" as a reference to the Samson story in the Hebrew Bible. Other members of the group rejected her offer.

== Nuclear ambiguity ==
Israel refuses to confirm or deny it has nuclear weapons or to describe how it would use them, a policy of deliberate ambiguity known as "nuclear ambiguity" or "nuclear opacity." This has made it difficult for anyone outside the Israeli government to describe the country's true nuclear policy definitively, while still allowing Israel to influence the perceptions, strategies and actions of other governments. However, over the years, some Israeli leaders have publicly acknowledged their country's nuclear capability: Ephraim Katzir in 1974, Moshe Dayan in 1981, Shimon Peres in 1998, and Ehud Olmert in 2006.

During his 2006 confirmation hearings before the United States Senate regarding his appointment as George W. Bush's secretary of defense, Robert Gates admitted that Israel had nuclear weapons, and two years later, in 2008, former US president Jimmy Carter stated the number of nuclear weapons held by Israel to be "150 or more".

In his 2008 book The Culture of War, Martin van Creveld, a professor of military history at Israel's Hebrew University, wrote that since Gates admitted that Israel had nuclear weapons, any talk of Israel's nuclear weapons in Israel can lead to "arrest, trial, and imprisonment." Thus Israeli commentators talk in euphemisms such as "doomsday weapons" and the Samson Option.

Nevertheless, as early as 1976, the CIA believed that Israel possessed 10 to 20 nuclear weapons. By 2021, it was estimated that the number had increased to approximately 90 warheads. Kenneth S. Brower has estimated as many as 400 nuclear weapons. These can be launched from land, sea and air. This gives Israel a second strike option even if much of the country is destroyed.

In 1991, American investigative journalist and Pulitzer Prize winning political writer Seymour Hersh authored the book Samson Option: Israel's Nuclear Arsenal & American Foreign Policy. In the preface of the book he writes: "This is a book about how Israel became a nuclear power in secret. It also tells how that secret was shared, sanctioned, and, at times, willfully ignored by the top political and military officials of the United States since the Eisenhower years."

== Deterrence doctrine ==
Although nuclear weapons were viewed as the ultimate guarantor of Israeli security as early as the 1960s, the country avoided building its military around them, instead pursuing absolute conventional superiority so as to forestall a last resort nuclear engagement. The original conception of the Samson Option was only as deterrence. According to Hersh and Israeli historian Avner Cohen, Israeli leaders like David Ben-Gurion, Shimon Peres, Levi Eshkol and Moshe Dayan coined the phrase in the mid-1960s. They named it after the biblical figure Samson, who pushed apart the pillars of a Philistine temple, bringing down the roof and killing himself and thousands of Philistines who had captured him, mutilated him, and gathered to see him further humiliated in chains as retribution for his massacres of their people. They contrasted it with the ancient siege of Masada, in which 936 Jewish Sicarii committed mass suicide rather than be defeated and enslaved by the Romans.

In an article titled "Last Secret of the Six-Day War" The New York Times reported that in the days before the 1967 Six-Day War Israel planned to insert a team of paratroopers by helicopter into the Sinai. Their mission was to set up and remotely detonate a nuclear bomb on a mountaintop as a warning to belligerent surrounding states. While outnumbered, Israel effectively eliminated the Egyptian Air Force and occupied the Sinai, winning the war before the test could even be set up. Retired Israeli brigadier general Itzhak Yaakov referred to this operation as the Israeli Samson Option.

In the 1973 Yom Kippur War, Arab forces were overwhelming Israeli forces and Prime Minister Golda Meir authorized a nuclear alert and ordered 13 atomic bombs be readied for use by missiles and aircraft. The Israeli Ambassador informed President Richard Nixon that "very serious conclusions" may occur if the United States did not airlift supplies. Nixon complied. This is seen by some commentators on the subject as the first threat of the use of the Samson Option.

Hersh writes that the "surprising victory of Menachem Begin's Likud Party in the May 1977 national elections ... brought to power a government that was even more committed than Labor to the Samson Option and the necessity of an Israeli nuclear arsenal."

Louis René Beres, a professor of political science at Purdue University, chaired Project Daniel, a group advising Prime Minister Ariel Sharon. He argues in the Final Report of Project Daniel and elsewhere that the effective deterrence of the Samson Option would be increased by ending the policy of nuclear ambiguity. In a 2004 article he recommends Israel use the Samson Option threat to "support conventional preemptions" against enemy nuclear and non-nuclear assets because "without such weapons, Israel, having to rely entirely upon non-nuclear forces, might not be able to deter enemy retaliations for the Israeli preemptive strike."

== Authors' opinions ==
Some have written about the "Samson Option" as a retaliation strategy.

=== Ari Shavit ===
Israeli reporter Ari Shavit writes of Israel's nuclear strategy:

Concerning anything and everything nuclear, Israel would be much, much more cautious than the United States and NATO. Concerning anything and everything nuclear, Israel would be the responsible adult of the international community. It would well understand the formidable nature of the demon and keep it locked in the basement"

=== David Perlmutter ===
In 2002, the Los Angeles Times published an opinion piece by Louisiana State University professor David D. Perlmutter, who stated:

Israel has been building nuclear weapons for 30 years. The Jews understand what passive and powerless acceptance of doom has meant for them in the past, and they have ensured against it. Masada was not an example to follow—it hurt the Romans not a whit, but Samson in Gaza? What would serve the Jew-hating world better in repayment for thousands of years of massacres but a Nuclear Winter. Or invite all those tut-tutting European statesmen and peace activists to join us in the ovens? For the first time in history, a people facing extermination while the world either cackles or looks away—unlike the Armenians, Tibetans, World War II European Jews or Rwandans—have the power to destroy the world. The ultimate justice?

— David Perlmutter

In his 2012 book How the End Begins: The Road to a Nuclear World War III, the American Jewish author Ron Rosenbaum described this opinion piece as "goes so far as to justify a Samson Option approach". In that book, Rosenbaum also opined that in the "aftermath of a second Holocaust", Israel could "bring down the pillars of the world (attack Moscow and European capitals for instance)" as well as the "holy places of Islam" and that the "abandonment of proportionality is the essence" of the Samson Option.

=== Martin van Creveld ===
In 2003, a military historian, Martin van Creveld, thought that the Second Intifada then in progress threatened Israel's existence. Van Creveld was quoted in David Hirst's The Gun and the Olive Branch (2003 edition) as saying:

We possess several hundred atomic warheads and rockets and can launch them at targets in all directions, perhaps even at Rome. Most European capitals are targets for our air force. Let me quote General Moshe Dayan: 'Israel must be like a mad dog, too dangerous to bother.' I consider it all hopeless at this point. We shall have to try to prevent things from coming to that, if at all possible. Our armed forces, however, are not the thirtieth strongest in the world, but rather the second or third. We have the capability to take the world down with us. And I can assure you that that will happen before Israel goes under.

— Martin van Creveld

=== Günter Grass ===
In 2012, German author Günter Grass published the poem "Was gesagt werden muss" ("What Must Be Said") which criticized Israel's nuclear weapons program.

Israeli poet and Holocaust survivor Itamar Yaoz-Kest published a reply poem entitled "The Right to Exist: a Poem-Letter to the German Author" which addresses Grass by name. It contains the line: "If you force us yet again to descend from the face of the Earth to the depths of the Earth—let the Earth roll toward the Nothingness".

Israeli Jerusalem Post journalist Gil Ronen saw this poem as referring to the Samson Option, which he described as the strategy of using Israel's nuclear weapons for "taking out Israel's enemies with it, possibly causing irreparable damage to the entire world."

== See also ==
- Begin doctrine – Israeli anti-WMD counter-proliferation doctrine
- Dahiya doctrine – Israeli strategy of destroying civilian buildings
- Dead Hand - Russian system of sending nuclear weapons as a last resort
- Hannibal Directive – Controversial Israeli military protocol
- Israel and weapons of mass destruction
- Massive retaliation – Military doctrine focusing on using more force in retaliation to an attack
- Mutual assured destruction – Doctrine of military strategy
- No first use – Policy on use of nuclear weapons
- Nuclear weapons of Israel
- Pre-emptive nuclear strike – Preemptive attack using nuclear weapons
- Preventive war – Military action to prevent an enemy from acquiring attack capabilities
- Project Daniel – Israeli threat assessment of Middle Eastern countries

== Bibliography ==
- Cohen, Avner (1998), Israel and the Bomb, Columbia University Press.
- Hersh, Seymour (1991), The Samson Option: Israel's Nuclear Arsenal and American Foreign Policy, Random House.
- Rosenbaum, Ron (2012), How the End Begins: The Road to a Nuclear World War III, Simon & Schuster, ISBN 978-1-4165-9422-2.
