= Nuclear weapons of Israel =

State of Israel
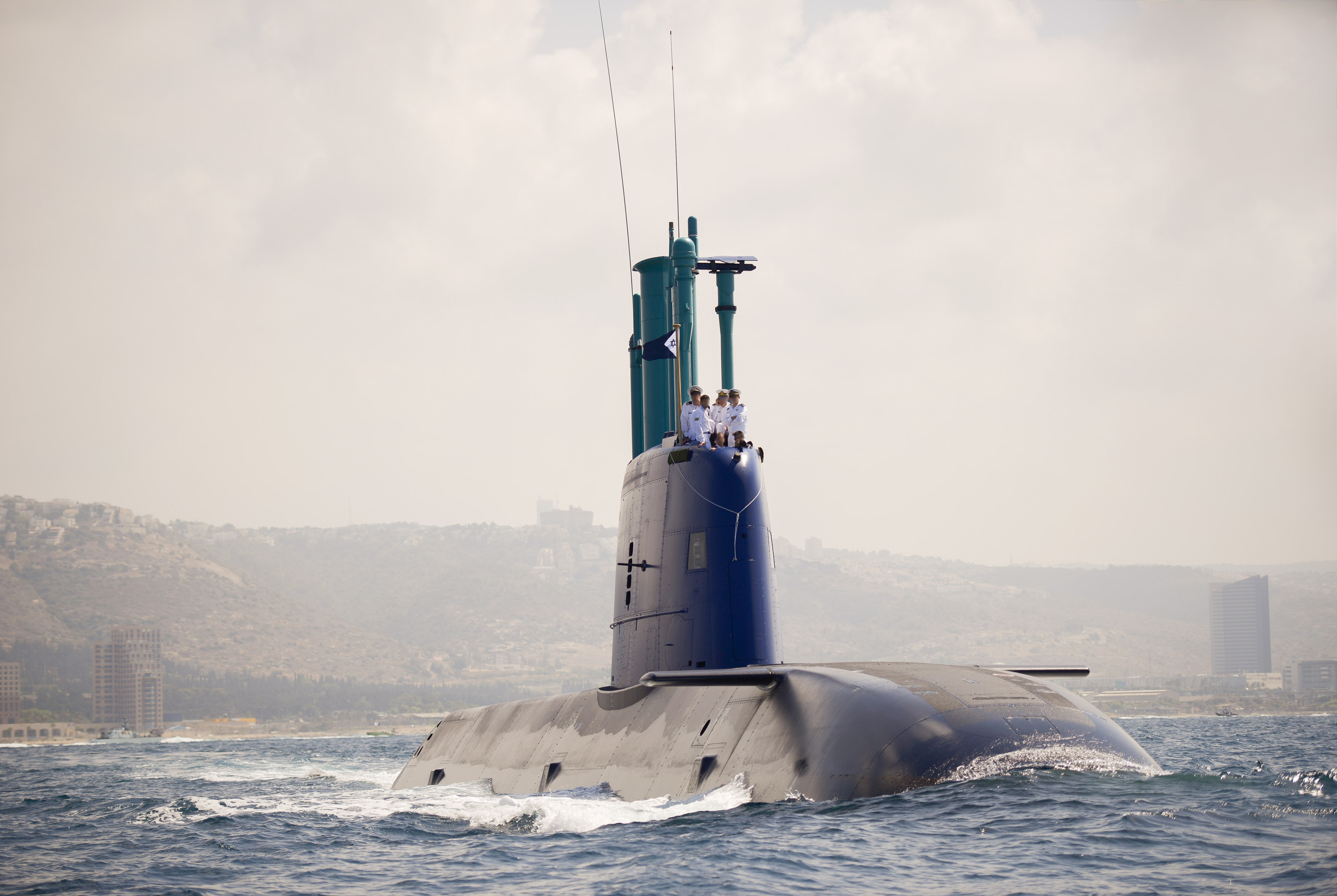
- INS Tanin, one of five Dolphin-class submarines believed to carry nuclear-armed cruise missiles

- Nuclear program start date: 1948 or 1949
- First nuclear weapon test: Partner in French nuclear testing 1960–1966, reported local Israeli underground test 1963, reported Israeli test in Vela incident 1979 (Note: Per BAS "If the 1979 flash was caused by a test, most experts agree it was probably an Israeli test")
- Current stockpile: 90–400 warheads (Note: There are a wide range of estimates as to the size of the Israeli nuclear arsenal. For a compiled list of estimates, see Avner Cohen (2010). The Worst-Kept Secret: Israel's bargain with the Bomb. Columbia University Press. Table 1, p. xxvii and p. 82.)
- Maximum missile range: Up to 11,500 km (Note: Range data is from the Congressional Research Service which gives an estimation of "2,000–4,800–11,500" km. Other estimates include "4,800 to 6,500 km" and "more than 5,000 km".)
- Nuclear triad: Yes
- Strategic forces: Navy; Dolphin-class submarines; Popeye Turbo cruise missiles; Air Force; Jericho-series ballistic missiles; F-15, F-16 fighters
- NPT party: No

Israel is widely believed to possess nuclear weapons. Estimates of Israel's stockpile range from 90 to 400 warheads, and the country is believed to possess a nuclear triad of delivery options by air, land, and sea. Its first deliverable nuclear weapon is estimated to have been completed in late 1966 or early 1967, which would have made it the sixth of nine nuclear-armed countries.

Israel's nuclear weapons delivery systems are estimated to include between 25 and 100 of the Jericho series of medium to intercontinental range ballistic missiles, (Note: The exact range of Jericho III missile is unclear, estimated from 4,000 km to over 5,500 km, while an intercontinental range is over 5,500 km. The Jericho II missile is believed to have a medium range of 1,500 km.) five Dolphin-class submarines, with a total of 20 launch tubes for the Popeye Turbo submarine-launched cruise missile, and one squadron each of F-15 and F-16 fighters. (Note: F-15 and F-16 squadrons are both speculated to be assigned nuclear roles, while it is also speculated the F-35I has a nuclear capability.) Israel is also believed to have developed neutron bomb warheads and nuclear artillery rounds.

Israel maintains a policy of deliberate ambiguity, neither formally denying nor admitting to having nuclear weapons, instead repeating over the years that "Israel will not be the first country to introduce nuclear weapons to the Middle East". Israel interprets "introduce" to mean it will not test or formally acknowledge its nuclear arsenal. Western governments, including the United States, similarly do not acknowledge the Israeli capacity. Israeli officials, including prime ministers, have made statements that seemed to imply that Israel possesses nuclear weapons, including discussions of use in the Gaza war. It is believed that nuclear command and control decisions, including launch authorization, must be jointly agreed by the prime minister and the minister of defense, and that Israel uses permissive action links to secure its warheads.

Citing security threats, Israel rejects consistent international pressure to accede to the Treaty on the Non-Proliferation of Nuclear Weapons or to participate in negotiations of a Middle East weapons of mass destruction free zone. Under its Begin Doctrine, Israel carries out preventive strikes against regional actors it suspects of developing nuclear weapons. The Israeli Air Force conducted Operation Opera and Operation Orchard, which destroyed pre-critical Iraqi and Syrian nuclear reactors in 1981 and 2007, respectively. Israel and the United States have extensively targeted Iran's nuclear program, with airstrikes during their 2025 war and 2026 war, as well as malware and assassinations since 2010. The Samson Option refers to Israel's ability to use nuclear weapons as a deterrence strategy in the face of existential military threats to the nation.

Israel began to investigate nuclear-related science soon after it declared independence in 1948, and, with French cooperation, secretly began building the Negev Nuclear Research Center, (Note: Known since 2018 as the Shimon Peres Negev Nuclear Research Center) a facility near Dimona housing a nuclear reactor and reprocessing plant in the late 1950s. During the Six-Day War, Israel aborted a plan to demonstrate a nuclear weapon in the occupied Sinai. There is some evidence Israel increased its nuclear readiness during the Yom Kippur War and the Gulf War. The 1979 Vela incident is widely suspected to have been an Israeli nuclear test, in collaboration with South Africa. The first extensive media coverage came via the 1986 revelations by Mordechai Vanunu, a former Dimona technician. Vanunu was soon kidnapped by Mossad from Italy, brought back to Israel, and imprisoned for 18 years for treason and espionage. Israel is also suspected to possess offensive chemical and biological weapons.

== Development history ==
=== Before Dimona, 1949–1956 ===
Israel's first prime minister David Ben-Gurion was "nearly obsessed" with obtaining nuclear weapons to prevent the Holocaust from reoccurring. He stated, "What Einstein, Oppenheimer, and Teller, the three of them are Jews, made for the United States, could also be done by scientists in Israel, for their own people." Ben-Gurion decided to recruit Jewish scientists from abroad even before the end of the 1948 Arab–Israeli War that established Israel's independence. He and others, such as head of the Weizmann Institute of Science and defense ministry scientist Ernst David Bergmann, believed and hoped that Jewish scientists such as Oppenheimer and Teller would help Israel.

In 1949, a unit of the Israel Defense Forces Science Corps, known by the Hebrew acronym HEMED GIMMEL, began a two-year geological survey of the Negev. While a preliminary study was initially prompted by rumors of petroleum fields, one objective of the longer two year survey was to find sources of uranium; some small recoverable amounts were found in phosphate deposits. That year Hemed Gimmel funded six Israeli physics graduate students to study overseas, including one to go to the University of Chicago and study under Enrico Fermi, who had overseen the world's first artificial and self-sustaining nuclear chain reaction. In early 1952 Hemed Gimmel was moved from the IDF to the Ministry of Defense and was reorganized as the Division of Research and Infrastructure (EMET). That June, Bergmann was appointed by Ben-Gurion to be the first chairman of the Israel Atomic Energy Commission (IAEC).

Hemed Gimmel was renamed Machon 4 during the transfer, and was used by Bergmann as the "chief laboratory" of the IAEC; by 1953, Machon 4, working with the Department of Isotope Research at the Weizmann Institute, developed the capability to extract uranium from the phosphate in the Negev and a new technique to produce indigenous heavy water. The techniques were two years more advanced than American efforts. Bergmann, who was interested in increasing nuclear cooperation with the French, sold both patents to the Commissariat à l'énergie atomique (CEA) for 60 million francs. Although they were never commercialized, it was a consequential step for future French-Israeli cooperation.

In addition, Israeli scientists probably helped construct the G-1 plutonium production reactor and UP-1 reprocessing plant at Marcoule. France and Israel had close relations in many areas. France was principal arms supplier for the new Jewish state, and as instability spread through French colonies in North Africa, Israel provided valuable intelligence obtained from contacts with Sephardi Jews in those countries. At the same time, Israeli scientists were also observing France's own nuclear program and were the only foreign scientists allowed to roam "at will" at the nuclear facility at Marcoule. In addition to the relationships between Israeli and French Jewish and non-Jewish researchers, the French believed that cooperation with Israel could give them access to international Jewish nuclear scientists.

After U.S. President Dwight Eisenhower announced the Atoms for Peace initiative, Israel became the second country to sign on (following Turkey), and signed a peaceful nuclear cooperation agreement with the United States on July 12, 1955. This culminated in a public signing ceremony on March 20, 1957, to construct a "small swimming-pool research reactor in Nachal Soreq", which would be used to shroud the construction of a much larger facility with the French at Dimona.

In 1986 Francis Perrin, French high-commissioner for atomic energy from 1951 to 1970 stated publicly that in 1949 Israeli scientists were invited to the Saclay Nuclear Research Centre, this cooperation leading to a joint effort including sharing of knowledge between French and Israeli scientists especially those with knowledge from the Manhattan Project. According to Lieutenant Colonel Warner D. Farr in a report to the USAF Counterproliferation Center while France was previously a leader in nuclear research "Israel and France were at a similar level of expertise after the war, and Israeli scientists could make significant contributions to the French effort. Progress in nuclear science and technology in France and Israel remained closely linked throughout the early fifties." Furthermore, according to Farr, "There were several Israeli observers at the French nuclear tests and the Israelis had 'unrestricted access to French nuclear test explosion data.'"

=== Dimona, 1956–1965 ===
==== Negotiation ====
The French justified their decision to provide Israel a nuclear reactor by claiming it was not without precedent. In September 1955 Canada publicly announced that it would help the Indian government build a heavy-water research reactor, the CIRUS reactor, for "peaceful purposes". When Egyptian president Gamal Abdel Nasser nationalized the Suez Canal, France proposed Israel attack Egypt and invade the Sinai as a pretext for France and Britain to invade Egypt posing as "peacekeepers" with the true intent of seizing the Suez Canal (see Suez Crisis). In exchange, France would provide the nuclear reactor as the basis for the Israeli nuclear weapons program. Shimon Peres, sensing the opportunity on the nuclear reactor, accepted. On September 17, 1956, Peres and Bergmann reached a tentative agreement in Paris for the CEA to sell Israel a small research reactor. This was reaffirmed by Peres at the Protocol of Sèvres conference in late October for the sale of a reactor to be built near Dimona and for a supply of uranium fuel.

Israel benefited from an unusually pro-Israel French government during this time. After the Suez Crisis led to the threat of Soviet intervention and the British and French were being forced to withdraw under pressure from the U.S., Ben-Gurion sent Peres and Golda Meir to France. During their discussions, the groundwork was laid for France to build a larger nuclear reactor and chemical reprocessing plant, and Prime Minister Guy Mollet, ashamed at having abandoned his commitment to fellow socialists in Israel, supposedly told an aide, "I owe the bomb to them," while General Paul Ely, Chief of the Defence Staff, said, "We must give them this to guarantee their security, it is vital." Mollet's successor Maurice Bourgès-Maunoury stated, "I gave you [Israelis] the bomb in order to prevent another Holocaust from befalling the Jewish people and so that Israel could face its enemies in the Middle East."

The French–Israeli relationship was finalized on October 3, 1957, in two agreements the contents of which remain secret: One political, that declared the project to be for peaceful purposes and specified other legal obligations, and one technical that described a 24 megawatt EL-102 reactor. The one to actually be built was to be two to three times as large and be able to produce 22 kilograms of plutonium a year. When the reactor arrived in Israel, Prime Minister Ben-Gurion declared that its purpose was to provide a pumping station to desalinate a billion gallons of seawater annually and turn the desert into an "agricultural paradise". Six of seven members of the Israel Atomic Energy Commission promptly resigned, protesting that the reactor was the precursor to "political adventurism which will unite the world against us".

==== Excavation ====
Before construction began it was determined that the scope of the project would be too large for the EMET and IAEC team, so Shimon Peres recruited Colonel Manes Pratt, then Israeli military attaché in Burma, to be the project leader. Building began in late 1957 or early 1958, bringing hundreds of French engineers and technicians to the Beersheba and Dimona area. In addition, thousands of newly immigrated Sephardi Jews were recruited to do digging; to circumvent strict labor laws, they were hired in increments of 59 days, separated by one day off.

==== Creation of LEKEM ====
By the late 1950s Shimon Peres had established and appointed a new intelligence service assigned to search the globe and clandestinely secure technology, materials and equipment needed for the program, by any means necessary. The new service would eventually be named LEKEM (pronounced LAKAM, the Hebrew acronym for 'Science liaison Bureau'). Peres appointed IDF Internal Security Chief, Benjamin Blumberg, to the task. As head of the LEKEM, Blumberg would rise to become a key figure in Israel's intelligence community, coordinating agents worldwide and securing the crucial components for the program.

==== Rift between Israel and France ====
When Charles de Gaulle became French President in late 1958 he wanted to end French–Israeli nuclear cooperation and said that he would not supply Israel with uranium unless the plant was opened to international inspectors, declared peaceful, and no plutonium was reprocessed. Through an extended series of negotiations, Shimon Peres finally reached a compromise with Foreign Minister Maurice Couve de Murville over two years later, in which French companies would be able to continue to fulfill their contract obligations and Israel would declare the project peaceful. Due to this, French assistance did not end until 1966. However, the supply of uranium fuel was stopped earlier, in 1963. Despite this, a French uranium company based in Gabon may have sold Israel uranium in 1965. The US government launched an investigation but was unable to determine if such a sale had taken place.

==== Standoff between Israel and United States ====
The United States was concerned over possible Israeli nuclear proliferation. US intelligence began to notice the Dimona reactor shortly after construction began, when American U-2 spy planes overflew the reactor. In 1960, the outgoing Eisenhower administration asked the Israeli government for an explanation for the mysterious construction near Dimona. Israel's response was that the site was a future textile factory, but that no inspection would be allowed. When Ben-Gurion visited Washington in 1960, he held a series of meetings with State Department officials, and was bluntly told that for Israel to possess nuclear weapons would affect the balance of power in the region.

After John F. Kennedy took office as US president in 1961, he put continuous pressure on Israel to open the plant to American inspection. Israeli newspaper Haaretz reported in 2019 that, throughout the spring and summer of 1963, the leaders of the United States and Israel – President John F. Kennedy and prime ministers David Ben-Gurion and Levi Eshkol – were engaged in a high-stakes battle of wills over Israel's nuclear program. The tensions were invisible to the publics of both countries, and only a few senior officials, on both sides, were aware of the severity of the situation. According to Yuval Ne'eman, Eshkol, Ben-Gurion's successor, and his associates saw Kennedy as presenting Israel with a real ultimatum. According to Ne'eman, former Israeli Air Force commander Maj. Gen. (res.) Dan Tolkowsky seriously entertained the fear that Kennedy might send U.S. airborne troops to Dimona, the home of Israel's nuclear complex. US pressure was such that reportedly, every high-level meeting and communication between the US and Israeli governments contained a demand for an inspection of Dimona. To increase pressure, Kennedy denied Ben-Gurion a meeting at the White House – when they met in May 1961, it was at the Waldorf Astoria Hotel in New York. The meeting itself was dominated by this issue. Ben-Gurion was evasive on the issue for two years, in the face of persistent US demands for an inspection.

On March 25, 1963, President Kennedy and CIA Director John A. McCone discussed the Israeli nuclear program. According to McCone, Kennedy raised the "question of Israel acquiring nuclear capability," and McCone provided Kennedy with Kent's estimate of the anticipated negative consequences of Israeli nuclearization. According to McCone, Kennedy then instructed National Security Adviser McGeorge Bundy to guide Secretary of State Dean Rusk, in collaboration with the CIA director and the AEC chairman, to submit a proposal "as to how some form of international or bilateral U.S. safeguards could be instituted to protect against the contingency mentioned." That also meant that the "next informal inspection of the Israeli reactor complex [must] …be undertaken promptly and... be as thorough as possible."

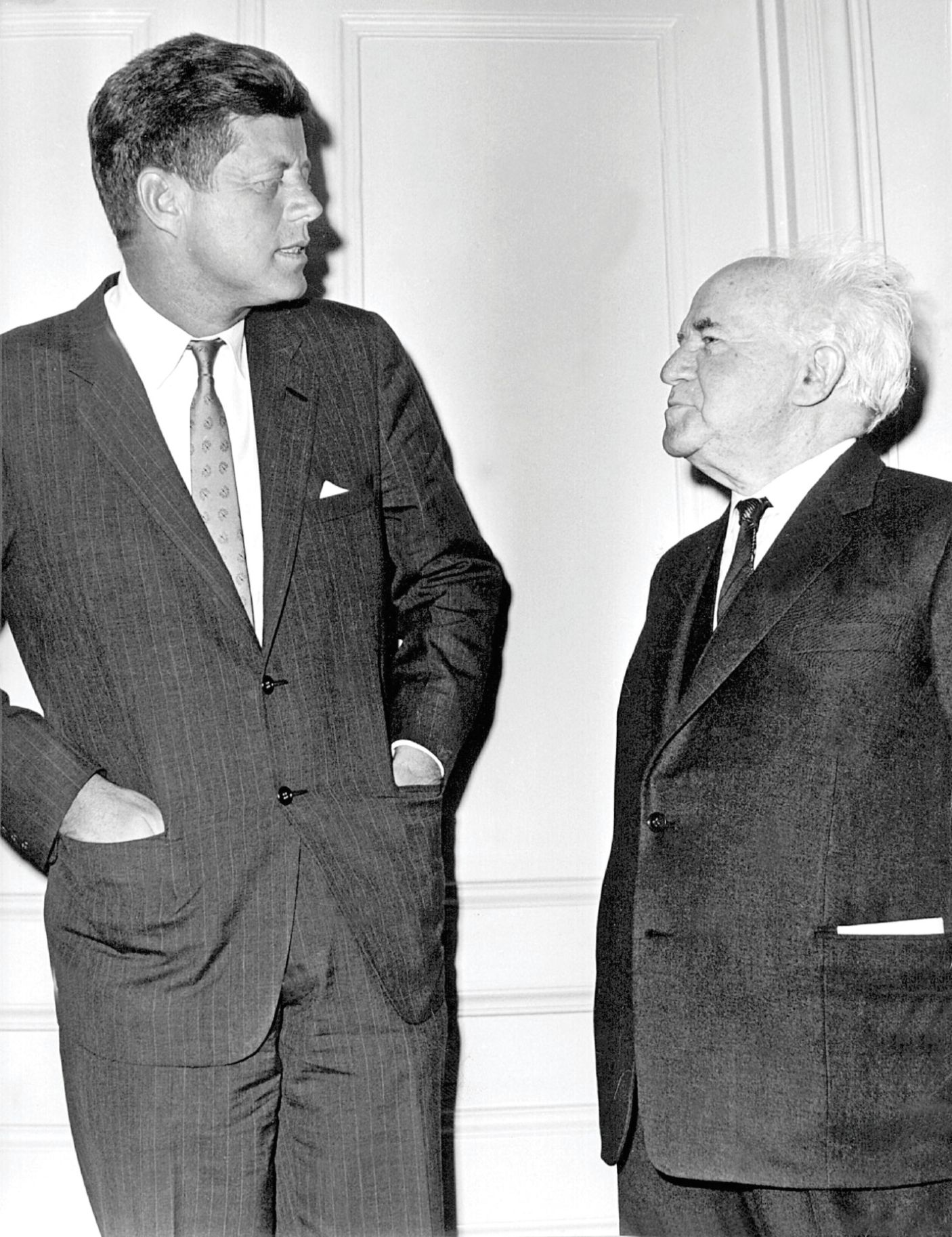
Kennedy and Ben-Gurion in 1961.

On April 2, 1963, Ambassador Barbour met Prime Minister Ben-Gurion and presented the American request for his "assent to semi-annual visits to Dimona perhaps in May and November, with full access to all parts and instruments in the facility, by qualified U.S. scientists." Ben-Gurion, apparently taken by surprise, responded by saying the issue would have to be postponed until after Passover, which that year ended on April 15. To highlight the point further, two days later, Assistant Secretary Talbot summoned Israeli Ambassador Harman to the State Department and presented him with a diplomatic démarche on the inspections. This message to Ben-Gurion was the first salvo in what would become "the toughest American-Israeli confrontation over the Israeli nuclear program".

On April 26, 1963, more than three weeks after the original U.S. demand concerning Dimona, Ben-Gurion responded to Kennedy with a seven-page letter that focused on broad issues of Israeli security and regional stability. Claiming that Israel faced an unprecedented threat, Ben-Gurion invoked the specter of "another Holocaust," and insisted that Israel's security should be protected by joint external security guarantees, to be extended by the U.S. and the Soviet Union. Kennedy, however, was determined not to let Ben-Gurion change the subject. On May 4, 1963, he replied to the prime minister, assuring him that while "we are watching closely current developments in the Arab world," as to Ben-Gurion's proposal for a joint superpower declaration, Kennedy dismissed both its practicality and its political wisdom. Kennedy was much less worried about an "early Arab attack" than he was by "a successful development of advanced offensive systems which, as you say, could not be dealt with by presently available means."

Kennedy would not budge on Dimona, and the disagreements became a "pain in the neck" for him, as Robert Komer later wrote. The confrontation with Israel escalated when the State Department transmitted Kennedy's latest letter to the Tel Aviv embassy on June 15 for immediate delivery to Ben-Gurion by Ambassador Barbour. In the letter Kennedy fleshed out his insistence on biannual visits with a set of detailed technical conditions. The letter was akin to an ultimatum: If the U.S. government could not obtain "reliable information" on the state of the Dimona project, Washington's "commitment to and support of Israel" could be "seriously jeopardized." But the letter was never presented to Ben-Gurion. The telegram with Kennedy's letter arrived in Tel Aviv on Saturday, June 15, the day before Ben-Gurion's announcement of his resignation, a decision that stunned his country and the world. Ben-Gurion never explained, in writing or orally, what led him to resign, beyond citing "personal reasons." He denied that his move was related to any specific policy issues, but the question of the extent to which Kennedy's Dimona pressure played a role remains open to discussion to the present day.

On July 5, less than 10 days after Levi Eshkol succeeded Ben-Gurion as prime minister, Ambassador Barbour delivered to him a first letter from President Kennedy. The letter was virtually a copy of the undelivered letter of June 15 to Ben-Gurion. As Yuval Ne'eman stated, it was immediately apparent to Eshkol and his advisers that Kennedy's demands were akin to an ultimatum, and thus constituted a crisis in the making. A stunned Eshkol, in his first and interim response, on July 17, requested more time to study the subject and for consultations. The premier noted that while he hoped that U.S-Israeli friendship would grow under his watch, "Israel would do what it had to do for its national security and to safeguard its sovereign rights." Barbour, apparently wanting to mitigate the bluntness of the letter, assured Eshkol that Kennedy's statement was "factual": Critics of strong U.S.-Israel relations might complicate the diplomatic relationship if Dimona was left uninspected.

On August 19, after six weeks of consultations that generated at least eight different drafts, Eshkol handed Barbour his written reply to Kennedy's demands. It began by reiterating Ben-Gurion's past assurances that Dimona's purpose was peaceful. As to Kennedy's request, Eshkol wrote that given the special relationship between the two countries, he had decided to allow regular visits of U.S. representatives to the Dimona site. On the specific issue of the schedule, Eshkol suggested – as Ben-Gurion had in his last letter to Kennedy – that late 1963 would be the time for the first visit: By then, he wrote, "the French group will have handed the reactor over to us and it will be undertaking general tests and measurements of its physical parameters at zero power."

Eshkol was vague on the proposed frequency of visits. Eshkol disregarded Kennedy's demand for biannual tours, while avoiding a frontal challenge to Kennedy's request. "Having considered this request, I believe we shall be able to reach agreement on the future schedule of visits," Eshkol wrote. In sum, the prime minister split the difference: To end the confrontation, he assented to "regular visits" by U.S. scientists, but he did not accept the idea of the prompt visit that Kennedy wanted and avoided making an explicit commitment to biannual inspections. Kennedy's appreciative reply did not mention these divergences but assumed a basic agreement on "regular visits."

In the wake of Eshkol's letter, the first of the long-sought regular inspection visits to Dimona took place in mid-January 1964, two months after Kennedy's assassination. The Israelis told the American visitors that the reactor had gone critical only a few weeks earlier, but that claim was not accurate. Israel acknowledged years later that the Dimona reactor became operational in mid-1963, as the Kennedy administration had originally assumed.

It turned out that Kennedy's insistence on biannual visits to Dimona was not implemented after his death. U.S. government officials remained interested in such a schedule, and President Lyndon B. Johnson did raise the issue with Eshkol, but he never pressed hard on the subject the way that Kennedy had.

In the end, the confrontation between President Kennedy and two Israeli prime ministers resulted in a series of six American inspections of the Dimona nuclear complex, once a year between 1964 and 1969. They were never conducted under the strict conditions Kennedy laid out in his letters. While Kennedy's successor remained committed to the cause of nuclear nonproliferation and supported American inspection visits at Dimona, he was much less concerned about holding the Israelis to Kennedy's terms. In retrospect, this change of attitude may have saved the Israeli nuclear program.

Israel eventually accepted an inspection, and Kennedy made two concessions – the US would sell Israel Hawk anti-aircraft missiles after having refused to sell Israel any major weapon systems for years. In addition, the US government agreed to the Israeli demand that the inspections would be carried out by an all-American team which would schedule its visits weeks in advance, rather than the IAEA.

Allegedly, because Israel knew the schedule of the inspectors' visits, it was able to disguise the true purpose of the reactor. The inspectors eventually reported that their inspections were useless due to Israeli restrictions on what parts of the facility they could investigate. According to British writer and intelligence expert Gordon Thomas, former Mossad agent Rafi Eitan told him how the inspectors were fooled:

A bogus control center was built over the real one at Dimona, complete with fake control panels and computer-lined gauges that gave a credible impression of measuring the output of a reactor engaged in an irrigation scheme to turn the Negev into a lush pastureland. The area containing the "heavy" water smuggled from France and Norway was placed off-limits to the inspectors "for safety reasons". The sheer volume of heavy water would have been proof the reactor was being readied for a very different purpose.

In 1964, the US government tried to prevent Argentina's sale of yellowcake to Israel, with no success.

In 1968, the CIA stated in a top-secret National Intelligence Estimate that Israel had nuclear weapons. This assessment was given to President Lyndon B. Johnson. The basis for this claim was the CIA's belief, although never proven, that the uranium that went missing in the Apollo Affair had been diverted to Israel (Seymour Hersh claims that during the plant decommissioning nearly all of the missing uranium was recovered trapped in the facility pipes or accounted for.), as well as evidence gathered from NSA electronic eavesdropping on Israeli communications, which proved that the Israeli Air Force had engaged in practice bombing runs that only made sense for the delivery of nuclear weapons.

In 1969, the year Richard Nixon became president, the US government terminated the inspections. According to US government documents declassified in 2007, the Nixon administration was concerned with Israel's nuclear program, worrying that it could set off a regional nuclear arms race, with the Soviet Union possibly granting the Arab states a nuclear guarantee. In a memorandum dated July 19, 1969, National Security Adviser Henry Kissinger warned that "The Israelis, who are one of the few peoples whose survival is genuinely threatened, are probably more likely than almost any other country to actually use their nuclear weapons."

However, Kissinger warned that attempting to force Israel to disarm could have consequences, writing that "Israel will not take us seriously on the nuclear issue unless they believe we are prepared to withhold something they very much need" (Kissinger was referring to a pending sale of F-4 Phantom fighter jets to Israel). Kissinger wrote that "if we withhold the Phantoms and they make this fact public in the United States, enormous political pressure will be mounted on us. We will be in an indefensible position if we cannot state why we are withholding the planes. Yet if we explain our position publicly, we will be the ones to make Israel's possession of nuclear weapons public with all the international consequences this entails." Among the suggestions Kissinger presented to Nixon was the idea of the United States adopting a policy of "nuclear ambiguity", or pretending not to know about Israel's nuclear program.

According to Israeli historian Avner Cohen, author of Israel and the Bomb, historical evidence indicates that when Nixon met with Israeli prime minister Golda Meir at the White House in September 1969, they reached a secret understanding, where Israel would keep its nuclear program secret and refrain from carrying out nuclear tests, and the United States would tolerate Israel's possession of nuclear weapons and not press it to sign the Nuclear Non-Proliferation Treaty (NPT).

Despite requests from open-government activists, subsequent U.S. presidents have respected Israel's request not to disclose any information about its possession of nuclear weapons, and federal employees with security clearances are prohibited from doing so.

==== British and Norwegian aid ====
Top secret British documents obtained by BBC Newsnight show that Britain made hundreds of secret shipments of restricted materials to Israel in the 1950s and 1960s. These included specialist chemicals for reprocessing and samples of fissile material—uranium-235 in 1959, and plutonium in 1966, as well as highly enriched lithium-6, which is used to boost fission bombs and fuel hydrogen bombs. The investigation also showed that Britain shipped 20 tons of heavy water directly to Israel in 1959 and 1960 to start up the Dimona reactor. The transaction was made through a Norwegian front company called Noratom, which took a 2% commission on the transaction.

Britain was challenged about the heavy water deal at the International Atomic Energy Agency after it was exposed on Newsnight in 2005. British foreign minister Kim Howells claimed this was a sale to Norway. But a former British intelligence officer who investigated the deal at the time confirmed that this was really a sale to Israel and the Noratom contract was just a charade. The Foreign Office finally admitted in March 2006 that Britain knew the destination was Israel all along. Israel admits running the Dimona reactor with Norway's heavy water since 1963. French engineers who helped build Dimona say the Israelis were expert operators, so only a relatively small portion of the water was lost during the years since the reactor was first put into operation.

=== Criticality ===
In 1961, the Israeli Prime Minister David Ben-Gurion informed the Canadian prime minister John Diefenbaker that a pilot plutonium-separation plant would be built at Dimona. British intelligence concluded from this and other information that this "can only mean that Israel intends to produce nuclear weapons". The nuclear reactor at Dimona went critical in 1962. After Israel's rupture with France, the Israeli government reportedly reached out to Argentina. The Argentine government agreed to sell Israel yellowcake (uranium oxide). Between 1963 and 1966, about 90 tons of yellowcake were allegedly shipped to Israel from Argentina in secret. By 1965 the Israeli reprocessing plant was completed and ready to convert the reactor's fuel rods into weapons grade plutonium.

==== Costs ====
The exact costs for the construction of the Israeli nuclear program are unknown, though Peres later said that the reactor cost $80 million in 1960, half of which was raised by foreign Jewish donors, including many American Jews. Some of these donors were given a tour of the Dimona complex in 1968.

=== Weapons production, 1966–present ===
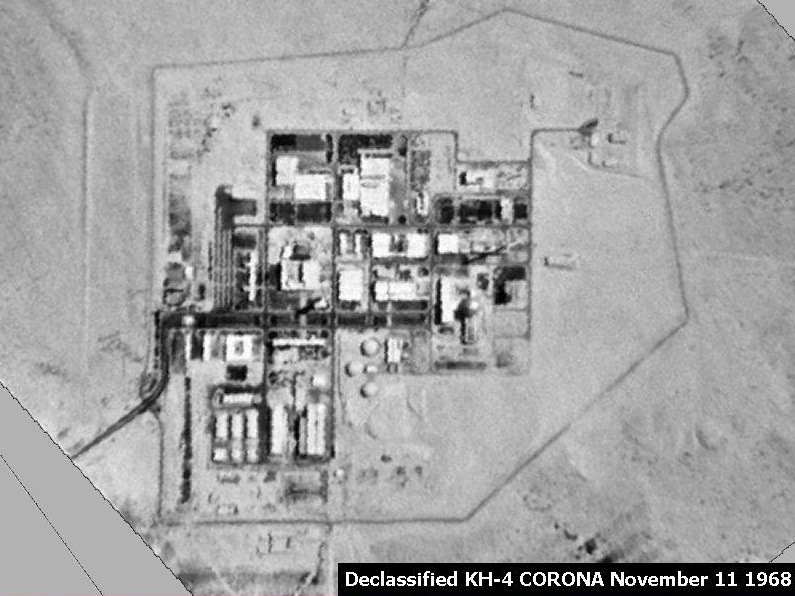
Completed Dimona complex as seen by US Corona satellite on November 11, 1968

Israel is believed to have begun full-scale production of nuclear weapons following the 1967 Six-Day War, although it had built its first operational nuclear weapon by December 1966. A Central Intelligence Agency (CIA) report from early 1967 stated that Israel had the materials to construct a bomb in six to eight weeks and some authors suggest that Israel had two crude bombs ready for use during the war. According to US journalist Seymour Hersh, everything was ready for production at this time save an official order to do so. Israel crossed the nuclear threshold on the eve of the Six-Day War in May 1967. "[Prime Minister] Eshkol, according to a number of Israeli sources, secretly ordered the Dimona [nuclear reactor] scientists to assemble two crude nuclear devices. He placed them under the command of Brigadier General Yitzhak Yaakov, the chief of research and development in Israel's Defense Ministry. The crude atomic bombs were readied for deployment on trucks that could race to the Egyptian border for detonation in the event Arab forces overwhelmed Israeli defenses." Spider (Hebrew: עכביש) was the name for the devices. The name for the plan was Operation Shimshon (Hebrew: מבצע שמשון), named after the death of Samson in Judges 16:30. It was also referred to as Operation Samson, codename "Samson" (Hebrew: שם הקוד "שמשון"), or (Hebrew: מבצע שמשון, romanized: Mivtza Shimshon). General Yaakov also sometimes called the plan Operation Doomsday. (Hebrew: מבצע יום הדין, romanized: Mivtza Yum Hadin).

Another CIA report from 1968 states that "Israel might undertake a nuclear weapons program in the next several years." Moshe Dayan, then Defense Minister, believed that nuclear weapons were cheaper and more practical than indefinitely growing Israel's conventional forces. He convinced the Labor Party's finance minister Pinchas Sapir of the value of commencing the program by giving him a tour of the Dimona site in early 1968, and soon after Dayan decided that he had the authority to order the start of full production of four to five nuclear warheads a year. Hersh stated that it is widely believed that the words "Never Again" were welded, in English and Hebrew, onto the first warhead.

In order to produce plutonium the Israelis needed a large supply of uranium ore. In 1968, the Mossad purchased 200 tons from Union Minière du Haut Katanga, a Belgian mining company, on the pretense of buying it for an Italian chemical company in Milan. Once the uranium was shipped from Antwerp it was transferred to an Israeli freighter at sea and brought to Israel. The orchestrated disappearance of the uranium, named Operation Plumbat, became the subject of the 1978 book The Plumbat Affair.

Estimates as to how many warheads Israel has built since the late 1960s have varied, mainly based on the amount of fissile material that could have been produced and on the revelations of Israeli nuclear technician Mordechai Vanunu.

Mordechai Vanunu's photograph of a Negev Nuclear Research Center glove box containing nuclear materials in a model bomb assembly, one of about 60 photographs he later gave to the British press

By 1969, U.S. Defense Secretary Melvin Laird believed that Israel might have a nuclear weapon that year. Later that year, U.S. President Richard Nixon in a meeting with Israeli prime minister Golda Meir pressed Israel to "make no visible introduction of nuclear weapons or undertake a nuclear test program", so maintaining a policy of nuclear ambiguity. Before the Yom Kippur War, Peres nonetheless wanted Israel to publicly demonstrate its nuclear capability to discourage an Arab attack, and fear of Israeli nuclear weapons may have discouraged Arab military strategy during the war from being as aggressive as it could have been.

The CIA believed that Israel's first bombs may have been made with highly enriched uranium stolen in the mid-1960s from the U.S. Navy nuclear fuel plant operated by the Nuclear Materials and Equipment Corporation, where sloppy material accounting would have masked the theft.

By 1974, the U.S. intelligence community believed Israel had stockpiled a small number of fission weapons, and by 1979 were perhaps in a position to test a more advanced small tactical nuclear weapon or thermonuclear weapon trigger design.

The CIA believed that the number of Israeli nuclear weapons stayed from 10 to 20 from 1974 until the early 1980s. Vanunu's information in October 1986 said that based on a reactor operating at 150 megawatts and a production of 40 kg of plutonium per year, Israel had 100 to 200 nuclear devices. Vanunu revealed that between 1980 and 1986 Israel attained the ability to build thermonuclear weapons. By the mid 2000s estimates of Israel's arsenal ranged from 75 to 400 nuclear warheads.

Several reports have surfaced claiming that Israel has some uranium enrichment capability at Dimona. Vanunu asserted that gas centrifuges were operating in Machon 8, and that a laser enrichment plant was being operated in Machon 9 (Israel holds a 1973 patent on laser isotope separation). According to Vanunu, the production-scale plant has been operating since 1979–80. If highly enriched uranium is being produced in substantial quantities, then Israel's nuclear arsenal could be much larger than estimated solely from plutonium production.

In 1991 alone, as the Soviet Union dissolved, nearly 20 top Jewish Soviet scientists reportedly emigrated to Israel, some of whom had been involved in operating nuclear power plants and planning for the next generation of Soviet reactors. In September 1992, German intelligence was quoted in the press as estimating that 40 top Jewish Soviet nuclear scientists had emigrated to Israel since 1989.

The US denied an export license for a Cray supercomputer to Israel in 1989, but approved them in 1994 and in 1996. A 1987 Pentagon-sponsored study concluded that Technion – Israel Institute of Technology scientists develop Israeli nuclear missile re-entry vehicles and work at the Dimona site, while Hebrew University of Jerusalem scientists work at the Soreq site where thermonuclear explosion simulation code is developed. The Wisconsin Project on Nuclear Arms Control cited critics concerned that the sale would set a poor precedent when considering supercomputer sales to the nuclear-armed states of China, India, and Pakistan.

In a 2010 interview, Uzi Eilam, former head of the Israeli Atomic Energy Commission, told the Israeli daily Maariv that the nuclear reactor in Dimona had been through extensive improvements and renovations and is now functioning as new, with no safety problems or hazard to the surrounding environment or the region.

== Nuclear testing ==
According to Lieutenant Colonel Warner D. Farr in a report to the US Air Force Counterproliferation Center, much lateral proliferation happened between pre-nuclear Israel and France, stating "the French nuclear test in 1960 made two nuclear powers, not one—such was the depth of collaboration" and that "the Israelis had unrestricted access to French nuclear test explosion data," minimizing the need for early Israeli testing, although this cooperation cooled following the success of the French tests.

In June 1976, a West Germany army magazine, Wehrtechnik ("defense technology"), claimed that Western intelligence reports documented Israel conducting an underground test in the Negev in 1963. The book Nuclear Weapons in the Middle East: Dimensions and Responsibilities by Taysir Nashif cites other reports that on November 2, 1966, the country may have carried out a non-nuclear test, speculated to be zero yield or implosion in nature in the Israeli Negev desert.

On September 22, 1979, Israel may have been involved in a possible nuclear bomb test, also known as the Vela incident, in the southern Indian Ocean. A committee was set up under then-U.S. president Jimmy Carter, headed by Professor Jack Ruina of the Massachusetts Institute of Technology (MIT). Most of the committee's members assumed that South African navy vessels had sailed out of Simonstown port, near Cape Town, to a secret location in the Indian Ocean, where they conducted the nuclear test. The committee defined the nuclear device tested as compact and especially clean, emitting little radioactive fallout, making it very nearly impossible to pinpoint. Another committee assessment concluded a cannon had fired a nuclear artillery shell, and the detected test was focused on a small tactical nuclear weapon.

After renouncing their nuclear weapons program, South Africa was revealed to have only six large, primitive, aircraft-deliverable atomic bombs, with a seventh being built, but no sophisticated miniaturized devices of the artillery shell size. Avner Cohen, professor at the Middlebury Institute of International Studies and Director of the Education Program and Senior Fellow at the James Martin Center for Nonproliferation Studies, stated regarding the Vela incident that "Now, 40 years later, there is a scientific and historical consensus that it was a nuclear test and that it had to be Israeli."

In what it called the "Last Secret of the Six-Day War", The New York Times reported that in the days before the 1967 Six-Day War Israel planned to insert a team of paratroopers by helicopter into the Sinai, set up, and remote detonate a nuclear bomb on command from the prime minister and military command on a mountaintop as a warning to belligerent surrounding states. However, Israel won the war before the test could be set up. Retired Israeli brigadier general Itzhak Yaakov referred to this operation as the Israeli Samson Option.

Pioneering American nuclear weapons designer Theodore Taylor commented on the uncertainties involved in the process of boosting small fission weapons and the thermonuclear designs seen in the Vanunu leaked photographs. He stated that these designs required more than theoretical analysis for full confidence in the weapons' performance. Taylor therefore concluded that Israel had "unequivocally" tested an advanced series miniaturized nuclear device.

== Revelations ==
=== Negev Nuclear Research Center (Dimona) ===
The Israeli nuclear program was first revealed on December 13, 1960, in a Time magazine article, which said that a non-Communist, non-NATO country had made an "atomic development". On December 16, the Daily Express in London revealed this country to be Israel, and on December 18, US Atomic Energy Commission chairman John McCone appeared on Meet the Press to officially confirm the Israeli construction of a nuclear reactor and announce his resignation. The following day The New York Times, with the help of McCone, revealed that France was assisting Israel.

The news led Ben-Gurion to make the only statement by an Israeli prime minister about Dimona. On December 21 he announced to the Knesset that the government was building a 24 megawatt reactor "which will serve the needs of industry, agriculture, health, and science", and that it "is designed exclusively for peaceful purposes". Bergmann, who was chairman of the Israel Atomic Energy Commission from 1954 to 1966, however said that "There is no distinction between nuclear energy for peaceful purposes or warlike ones" and that "We shall never again be led as lambs to the slaughter".

=== Weapons production ===
The first public revelation of Israel's nuclear capability (as opposed to development program) came from NBC News, which reported in January 1969 that Israel decided "to embark on a crash course program to produce a nuclear weapon" two years previously, and that they possessed or would soon be in possession of such a device. This was initially dismissed by Israeli and U.S. officials, as well as in an article in The New York Times. Just one year later on July 18, The New York Times made public for the first time that the U.S. government believed Israel to possess nuclear weapons or to have the "capacity to assemble atomic bombs on short notice". Israel reportedly assembled 13 bombs during the Yom Kippur War as a last defense against total defeat, and kept them usable after the war.

The first extensive details of the weapons program came in the London Sunday Times on October 5, 1986, which published information provided by Mordechai Vanunu, a technician formerly employed at the Negev Nuclear Research Center near Dimona. For publication of state secrets Vanunu was kidnapped by the Mossad in Rome, brought back to Israel, and sentenced to 18 years in prison for treason and espionage. Although there had been much speculation prior to Vanunu's revelations that the Dimona site was creating nuclear weapons, Vanunu's information indicated that Israel had also built thermonuclear weapons.

Theodore Taylor, a former U.S. weapon designer leading the field in small, efficient nuclear weapons, reviewed the 1986 leaks and photographs of the Israeli nuclear program by Mordechai Vanunu in detail. Taylor concluded that Israel's thermonuclear weapon designs appeared to be "less complex than those of other nations," and as of 1986 "not capable of producing yields in the megaton or higher range." Nevertheless, "they may produce at least several times the yield of fission weapons with the same quantity of plutonium or highly enriched uranium." In other words, Israel could "boost" the yield of its nuclear fission weapons. According to Taylor, the uncertainties involved in the process of boosting required more than theoretical analysis for full confidence in the weapons' performance. Taylor therefore concluded that Israel had "unequivocally" tested a miniaturized nuclear device. The Institute for Defense Analyses (IDA) concluded after reviewing the evidence given by Vanunu that as of 1987, "the Israelis are roughly where the U.S. was in the fission weapon field in about 1955 to 1960" and would require supercomputers or parallel computing clusters to refine their hydrogen bomb designs for improved yields without testing, though noting they were already then developing the computer code base required. Israel was first permitted to import US built supercomputers beginning in November 1995.

According to a 2013 report by the Bulletin of the Atomic Scientists, which cited US Defense Intelligence Agency sources, Israel began the production of nuclear weapons in 1967, when it produced its first two nuclear bombs. According to the report's calculations, Israel produced nuclear weapons at an average rate of two per year, and stopped production in 2004. The report stated that Israel has 80 nuclear warheads and has enough fissile material to produce 190 more. In 2014, former US president Jimmy Carter stated that "Israel has, what, 300 or more, nobody knows exactly how many" nuclear weapons.

In 2013, in an Israeli Channel 2 documentary, Israeli film producer Arnon Milchan revealed his role in Israeli nuclear development, including an illicit shipment of "nuclear triggers" from the US to Israel, resulting in a 1985 US indictment of one of his company executives. Charges against Milchan were dropped by the Reagan administration. American actor Robert De Niro also gave an interview in the documentary, recalling he was aware of the shipment.

=== South African documents ===
In 2010, The Guardian released South African government documents that it alleged confirmed the existence of Israel's nuclear arsenal. According to the newspaper, the documents are minutes taken by the South African side of alleged meetings between senior officials from the two countries in 1975. The Guardian alleged that these documents reveal that Israel had offered to sell South Africa nuclear weapons that year. The documents appeared to confirm information disclosed by a former South African naval commander Dieter Gerhardt – jailed in 1983 for spying for the Soviet Union, who said there was an agreement between Israel and South Africa involving an offer by Israel to arm eight Jericho missiles with atomic bombs.

However, Waldo Stumpf—who led a project to dismantle South Africa's nuclear weapons program—doubted Israel or South Africa would have contemplated a deal seriously, saying that Israel could not have offered to sell nuclear warheads to his country due to the serious international complications that such a deal could entail. Shimon Peres, then Defense Minister (later Israeli President), rejected the newspaper's claim that the negotiations took place. He also asserted that The Guardian's conclusions were "based on the selective interpretation of South African documents and not on concrete facts".

Avner Cohen, author of Israel and the Bomb and The Worst-Kept Secret: Israel's Bargain with the Bomb, said "Nothing in the documents suggests there was an actual offer by Israel to sell nuclear weapons to the regime in Pretoria."

== Stockpile ==
The State of Israel has never made public any details of its nuclear capability or arsenal. The following is a history of estimates by many different sources on the size and strength of Israel's nuclear arsenal. Estimates may vary due to the amount of material Israel has on store versus assembled weapons, and estimates as to how much material the weapons actually use, as well as the overall time in which the reactor was operated:

- 1948 – Israel begins recruiting Jewish nuclear scientists and forming scientific institutes during war of independence for a nuclear weapons program.
- 1949 – Israeli scientists invited to participate in French nuclear program.
- 1957 – Dimona nuclear facility construction begins with French assistance.
- 1960 – First French nuclear tests, Israeli scientists participated alongside French with access to all test data; Charles de Gaulle begins to disconnect French program from Israel.
- 1961 – Dimona nuclear facility operational.
- 1963 – Alleged underground nuclear test in the Negev desert.
- 1966 – Alleged underground nuclear test in the Negev desert, possibly zero yield or implosion type; first fully weaponized fission designed for aircraft delivery available for activation.
- 1967 – (Six-Day War) – 2 bombs; 13 bombs.
- 1969 – 5–6 bombs of 19 kilotons yield each.
- 1973 – (Yom Kippur War) – 13 bombs; 20 nuclear missiles, a suitcase bomb.
- 1974 – 3 capable artillery battalions each with twelve 175 mm tubes and a total of 108 warheads; 10 bombs.
- 1976 – 10–20 nuclear weapons. (Note: Data from the CIA.)
- 1979 – Vela incident, satellite detects possible advanced miniaturized and very clean nuclear test in Indian Ocean often attributed to Israel.
- 1980 – 100–200 bombs.
- 1984 – 12–31 atomic bombs; 31 plutonium bombs and 10 uranium bombs.
- 1985 – At least 100 nuclear bombs.
- 1986 – 100 to 200 fission bombs and a number of fusion bombs; Vanunu leaks Dimona facility secrets, at US's level in fission and boosted weapons as of 1955 to 1960, it would require supercomputers to improve their "less complex" hydrogen bombs without nuclear tests, they had "unequivocally" tested a miniaturized nuclear device.
- 1991 – 50–60 to 200–300.
- 1992 – more than 200 bombs; estimated 40 top nuclear weapons scientists immigrated to Israel from ex-USSR.
- 1994 – 64–112 bombs (5 kg/warhead); 50 nuclear-tipped Jericho missiles, 200 total; 300 nuclear weapons.
- 1995 – 66–116 bombs (at 5 kg/warhead); 70–80 bombs; "a complete repertoire" (neutron bombs, nuclear mines, suitcase bombs, submarine-borne).
- 1996 – 60–80 plutonium weapons, maybe more than 100 assembled, ER variants, variable yields.
- 1997 – More than 400 deliverable thermonuclear and nuclear weapons.
- 2002 – Between 75 and 200 weapons.
- 2004 – 82.
- 2006 – More than 185: the British parliament's Defence Select Committee reported that Israel possessed more warheads than the UK's 185.
- 2006 – Federation of American Scientists believes that Israel "could have produced enough plutonium for at least 100 nuclear weapons, but probably not significantly more than 200 weapons".
- 2008 – At least 150 nuclear weapons, according to former US president Jimmy Carter.
- 2008 – 80 intact warheads, of which 50 are re-entry vehicles for delivery by ballistic missiles, and the rest bombs for delivery by aircraft. Total military plutonium stockpile 340–560 kg.
- 2009 – Estimates of weapon numbers differ sharply with plausible estimates varying from 60 to 400.
- 2010 – According to Jane's Defence Weekly, Israel has between 100 and 300 nuclear warheads, most of them are probably being kept in unassembled mode but can become fully functional "in a matter of days".
- 2010 – "More than 100 weapons, mainly two-stage thermonuclear devices, capable of being delivered by missile, fighter-bomber, or submarine" After extensive renovations, Dimona facility now functioning as new.
- 2014 – Approximately 80 nuclear warheads, according to Federation of American Scientists, for delivery by two dozen missiles, a couple of squadrons of aircraft, and perhaps a small number of sea-launched cruise missiles.
- 2014 – "300 or more" nuclear weapons, according to former US president Jimmy Carter.
- 2015 – "Israel has 200, all targeted on Tehran" according to leaked email from Colin Powell.
- 2021 – Israel has 90 nuclear weapons, according to the Federation of American Scientists, assuming they are all plutonium-based tritium-boosted fission weapons and its warhead production is limited by its delivery systems and its number of targets.

== Delivery systems ==
Israeli military forces possess land, air, and sea-based methods for deploying their nuclear weapons, thus forming a nuclear triad that is mainly medium to long ranged, the backbone of which is submarine-launched cruise missiles and medium and intercontinental ballistic missiles, with Israeli Air Force long range strike aircraft on call to perform nuclear interdiction and strategic strikes. During 2008 the Jericho III ICBM became operational, giving Israel extremely long range nuclear strike abilities.

Israel's delivery systems are estimated to include one squadron each of F-15 and F-16 fighters, (Note: F-15 and F-16 squadrons are both speculated to be assigned nuclear roles, while it is also speculated the F-35I has a nuclear capability.) five Dolphin-class submarines, with a total of 20 launch tubes for the Popeye Turbo submarine-launched cruise missile, and around 50 of the Jericho series of medium to intercontinental range ballistic missiles. (Note: The exact range of Jericho III missile is unclear, estimated from 4,000 km to over 5,500 km, while an intercontinental range is over 5,500 km. The Jericho II missile is believed to have a medium range of 1,500 km.)

=== Missiles ===
Israel is believed to have nuclear second strike abilities in the form of its submarine fleet and its nuclear-capable ballistic missiles that are understood to be buried deeply enough that they would survive a first strike. Ernst David Bergmann was the first to seriously begin thinking about ballistic missile capability and Israel test-fired its first Shavit II sounding rocket in July 1961. In 1963, Israel put a large-scale project into motion, to jointly develop and build 25 short-range missiles with the French aerospace company Dassault. The Israeli project, codenamed Project 700, also included the construction of a missile field at Hirbat Zacharia, a site west of Jerusalem. The missiles that were first developed with France became the Jericho I system, first operational in 1971. It is possible that the Jericho I was removed from operational service during the 1990s.

In the mid-1980s the Jericho II medium-range missile, which is believed to have a range of 2,800–5,000 km, entered service. It is believed that Jericho II is capable of delivering nuclear weapons with a superior degree of accuracy. The Shavit three stages solid fuel space launch vehicle produced by Israel to launch many of its satellites into low earth orbit since 1988 is a civilian version of the Jericho II. The Jericho III ICBM, became operational in January 2008 and some reports speculate that the missile may be able to carry MIRVed warheads. The maximum range estimation of the Jericho III is 11,500 km with a payload of 1,000–1,300 kg (up to six small nuclear warheads of 100 kt each or one 1 megaton nuclear warhead), and its accuracy is considered high.

In January 2008, Israel carried out the successful test launch of a long-range, ballistic missile capable of carrying a nuclear warhead from the reported launch site at the Palmachim Airbase south of Tel Aviv. Israeli radio identified the missile as a Jericho III and the Hebrew YNet news Web site quoted unnamed defence officials as saying the test had been "dramatic" and that the new missile can reach "extremely long distances", without elaborating. Soon after the successful test launch, Isaac Ben-Israel, a retired army general and Tel Aviv University professor, told Israeli Channel 2 TV:

Everybody can do the math and understand that the significance is that we can reach with a rocket engine to every point in the world.

The test came two days after Ehud Olmert, then Israel's Prime Minister, warned that "all options were on the table to prevent Tehran from acquiring nuclear weapons" and a few months later Israel bombed a suspected Syrian nuclear facility built with extensive help from North Korea. At the same time, regional defense experts said that by the beginning of 2008, Israel had already launched a programme to extend the range of its existing Jericho II ground attack missiles. The Jericho-II B missile is capable of sending a one ton nuclear payload 5,000 kilometers. The range of Israel's' Jericho II B missiles is reportedly capable of being modified to carry nuclear warheads no heavier than 500 kg over 7,800 km, making it an ICBM. It is estimated that Israel has between 50 and 100 Jericho II B missiles based at facilities built in the 1980s. The number of Jericho III missiles that Israel possesses is unknown.

=== Aircraft ===
==== F-15 and F-16 ====
Israel's fighter aircraft have been cited as possible nuclear delivery systems. The Israeli Aerial refueling fleet of modified Boeing 707s and the use of external and conformal fuel tanks gives Israeli F-15, F-15I and F-16 fighter bombers strategic reach, as demonstrated in Operation Wooden Leg.

==== F-35I ====
It is widely speculated that the F-35I Adir may be able to carry nuclear weapons, as it is a derivative of the US nuclear-capable F-35A Lightning II. In 2018, Israeli Channel 2 reported in 2014 that, following Lockheed Martin's nuclear-capable upgrades, allowing some F-35As' weapons systems and software to interface with US permissive action links, a senior US official had declined to comment on whether Israel had requested the same upgrade to its F-35Is. In 2021, the Federation of American Scientists (FAS) assessed the most likely Israeli airbases actively assigned nuclear missions were Tel Nof Airbase and Hatzerim Airbase, which at the time did not operate F-35I squadrons. FAS previously assessed in 2014 the most likely airbases were Tel Nof and Nevatim Airbase. Nevatim Airbase was scheduled to receive F-35Is in 2017 and was operating three squadrons by 2021.

=== Submarines ===
The Israeli Navy operates a fleet of five modern German-built Dolphin-class submarines with a further three planned, and various reports indicate that these submarines are equipped with Popeye Turbo cruise missiles that can deliver nuclear and conventional warheads with extremely high accuracy.

The proven effectiveness of cruise missiles of its own production may have been behind Israel's recent acquisition of these submarines which are equipped with torpedo tubes suitable for launching long-range (1,500–2,400 km) nuclear-capable cruise missiles that would offer Israel a second strike capability. Israel is reported to possess a 200 kg nuclear warhead, containing 6 kg of plutonium, that could be mounted on cruise missiles. The missiles were reportedly test launched in the Indian Ocean near Sri Lanka in June 2000, and are reported to have hit their target at a range of 1,500 km.

In June 2002, former State Department and Pentagon officials confirmed that the US Navy observed Israeli missile tests in the Indian Ocean in 2000, and that the Dolphin-class vessels have been fitted with nuclear-capable cruise missiles of a new design. It is believed by some to be a version of Rafael Armament Development Authority's Popeye turbo cruise missile while some believe that the missile may be a version of the Gabriel 4LR that is produced by Israel Aircraft Industries. However, others claim that such a range implies an entirely new type of missile.

During the second half of the 1990s, Israel asked the United States to sell it 50 Tomahawk land-attack cruise missiles to enhance its deep-strike capabilities. Washington rejected Israel's request in March 1998, since such a sale would have violated the Missile Technology Control Regime guidelines, which prohibit the transfer of missiles with a range exceeding 300 km. Shortly after the rejection, an Israeli official told Defense News: "History has taught us that we cannot wait indefinitely for Washington to satisfy our military requirements. If this weapon system is denied to us, we will have little choice but to activate our own defense industry in pursuit of this needed capability." In July 1998, the Air Intelligence Center warned the US Congress that Israel was developing a new type of cruise missile.

According to Israeli defense sources, in June 2009 Israeli Dolphin-class submarine sailed from the Mediterranean to the Red Sea via the Suez Canal during a drill that showed that Israel can access the Indian Ocean, and the Persian Gulf, far more easily than before. Israel Defense Forces (IDF) sources said the decision to allow navy vessels to sail through the canal was made recently and was a definite "change of policy" within the service. Israeli officials said the submarine was surfaced when it passed through the canal. In the event of a conflict with Iran, and if Israel decided to involve its Dolphin-class submarines, the quickest route would be to send them through the Suez Canal.

The Israeli fleet was expanded after Israel signed a €1.3 billion contract to purchase two additional submarines from ThyssenKrupp's subsidiary Howaldtswerke-Deutsche Werft in 2006. These two U212s are to be delivered to the Israeli navy in 2011 and are "Dolphin II" class submarines. The submarines are believed to be capable of launching cruise missiles carrying nuclear warheads, despite statements by the German government in 2006, in confirming the sale of the two vessels, that they were not equipped to carry nuclear weapons. The two new boats are an upgraded version of the old Dolphins, and equipped with an air-independent propulsion system, that allow them to remain submerged for longer periods of time than the three nuclear arms-capable submarines that have been in Israel's fleet since 1999. In October 2009 it was reported that the Israeli navy sought to buy a sixth Dolphin class submarine.

On June 4, 2012, Der Spiegel published an investigative article stating that Israel has armed its newest submarines with nuclear missiles. Numerous Israeli and German officials were quoted testifying to the nuclear capabilities of the submarines and the placement of nuclear missiles aboard the ships. In response to the article, officials from both Germany and Israel refused to comment. Several papers have stated the implications of Israel attaining these nuclear weapon carrying submarines are increased due to the threat of attacks upon Iran by Israel.

=== Other ===
It has been reported that Israel has several other nuclear weapons capabilities:

- Suitcase bomb: Seymour Hersh reports that Israel developed the ability to miniaturize warheads small enough to fit in a suitcase by the year 1973.
- Tactical nuclear weapon: Israel may also have 175 mm and 203 mm self-propelled artillery pieces, capable of firing nuclear shells. There are three battalions of the 175 mm artillery (36 tubes), reportedly with 108 nuclear shells and more for the 203mm tubes. If true, these low yield, tactical nuclear artillery rounds could reach at least 40 kilometres (25 miles), while by some sources it is possible that the range was extended to 72 km (45 mi) during the 1990s.
- EMP strike capabilities: Israel allegedly possesses several 1 megaton bombs, which give it a very large EMP attack ability. For example, if a megaton-class weapon were to be detonated 400 kilometers above Omaha, Nebraska, US, nearly the entire continental United States would be affected with potentially damaging EMP experience from Boston to Los Angeles and from Chicago to New Orleans. A similar high-altitude airburst above Iran could cause serious damage to all of the electrical systems in the Middle East, and much of Europe.
- Enhanced Radiation Weapon (ERW): Israel also is reported to have an unknown number of neutron bombs.
- Nuclear land mine: Israel supposedly has deployed multiple defensive nuclear land mines in the Golan Heights.

== Missile defense ==
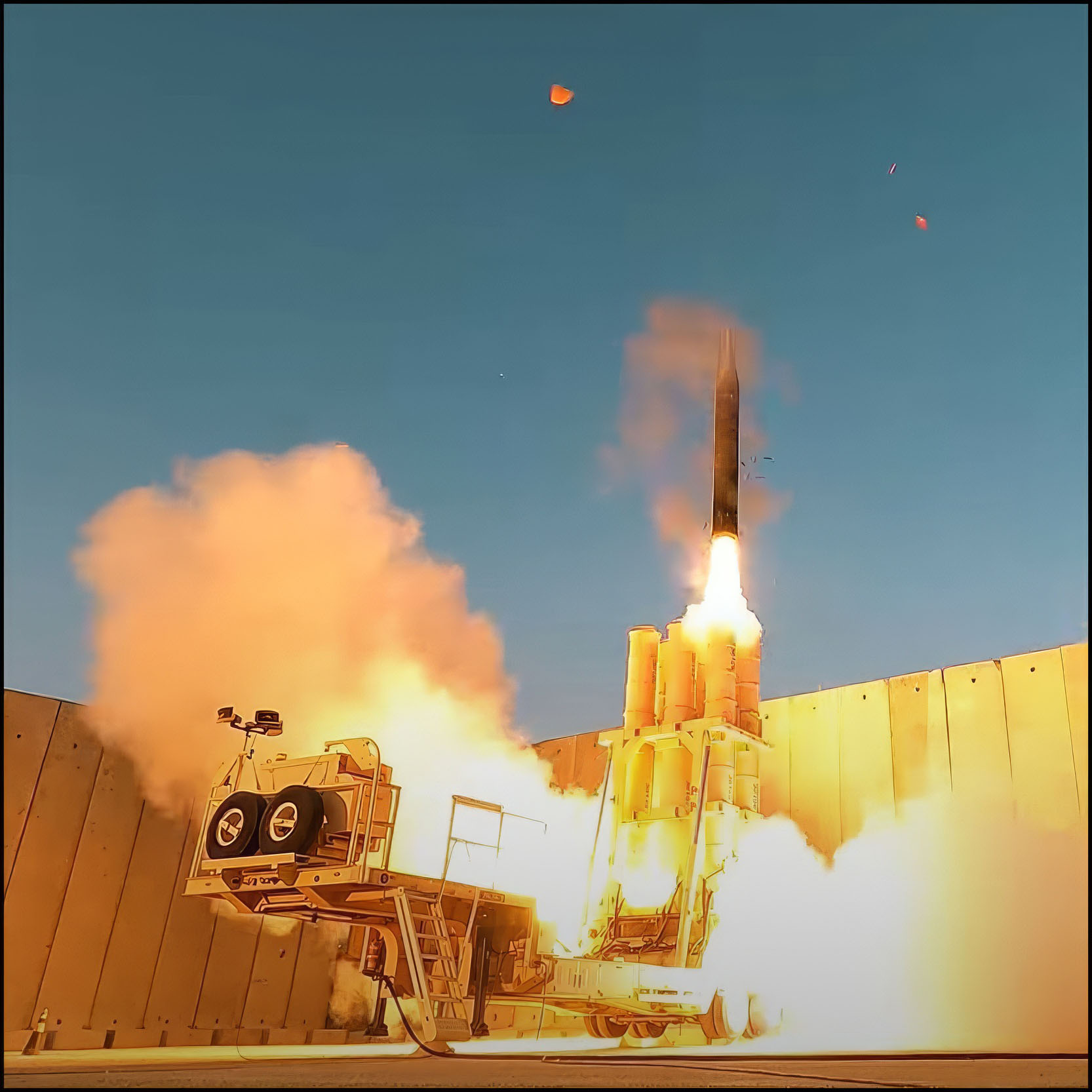
Arrow 3, Israeli anti-ballistic missile, launching during the 2025 Twelve-Day War.

For long-range missile defense, the US and Israel jointly developed the Arrow 3, operational since 2017, which is capable of exoatmospheric mid-course interceptions. A total of 24 interceptors are planned for the system. The Arrow 3 could potentially operate as an anti-satellite missile. For early warning, as of 2012, Israel deploys at least three EL/M-2080 Green Pine radars, one of which is the more advanced Block-B/"Great Pine" variant.

== Policy ==
Israel's deliberately ambiguous policy to confirm or deny its own possession of nuclear weapons, or to give any indication regarding their potential use, make it necessary to gather details from other sources, including diplomatic and intelligence sources and 'unauthorized' statements by its political and military leaders. In November 2023, government minister Amihai Eliyahu claimed that the use of nuclear weapons was "one of the possibilities" when discussing Israel's options in its ongoing Gaza war, for which he was suspended from the Israeli cabinet, but continued to participate in meetings via phone. His remarks were criticized by the Israeli opposition, a number of Arab countries, Iran, and China.

Alternatively, with the Begin Doctrine, Israel is very clear and decisive regarding the country's policy on potential developments of nuclear capability by any other regional adversaries, which it will not allow.

=== Possession ===
Although Israel has officially acknowledged the existence of the reactor near Dimona since Ben-Gurion's speech to the Knesset in December 1960, Israel has never officially acknowledged its construction or possession of nuclear weapons. In addition to this policy, on May 18, 1966, prime minister Levi Eshkol told the Knesset that "Israel has no atomic weapons and will not be the first to introduce them into our region," a policy first articulated by Shimon Peres to U.S. President John F. Kennedy in April 1963. In November 1968, Israeli Ambassador to the U.S. Yitzhak Rabin informed the U.S. State Department that its understanding of "introducing" nuclear weapons meant testing, deploying or making them public, while merely possessing the weapons did not constitute "introducing" them. Avner Cohen defines this initial posture as "nuclear ambiguity", but he defines the stage after it became clear by 1969 that Israel possessed nuclear weapons as a policy of amimut, or "nuclear opacity".

In 1998, former prime minister Shimon Peres said that Israel "built a nuclear option, not in order to have a Hiroshima but an Oslo". The "nuclear option" may refer to a nuclear weapon or to the nuclear reactor near Dimona, which Israel claims is used for scientific research. Peres, in his capacity as the Director General of the Ministry of Defense in the early 1950s, was responsible for building Israel's nuclear capability.

In a December 2006 interview, prime minister Ehud Olmert stated that Iran aspires "to have a nuclear weapon as America, France, Israel and Russia". Olmert's office later said that the quote was taken out of context; in other parts of the interview, Olmert refused to confirm or deny Israel's nuclear weapon status.

In January 2020, while giving a cabinet speech on the EastMed pipeline, prime minister Benjamin Netanyahu said "The significance of this project is that we are turning Israel into a nuclear power," and then corrected himself, saying "energy power".

In August 2022, prime minister Yair Lapid made what was interpreted as a veiled reference to Israeli nuclear weapons, in a speech to the Israel Atomic Energy Commission and at the same time as a NPT Review Conference in New York. He said the country has "defensive and offensive capabilities, and what is referred to in the foreign media as 'other capabilities'". Reuters noted it is common for Israeli journalists to reference foreign media's reporting on Israeli nuclear weapons as they are limited by Israeli military censorship.

In April 2023, former prime minister Ehud Barak tweeted in Hebrew that Israel "possesses nuclear weapons". Writing amid the Israeli judicial reform protests, he claimed Israeli and Western officials feared the current Netanyahu government as seeking to establish a "messianic dictatorship" that would destabilize the region.

On 5 November 2023, amid the Gaza war, Heritage Minister Amihai Eliyahu stated that the use of atomic weapons in the Israeli invasion of the Gaza Strip could be "one of the possibilities". He was subsequently suspended by prime minister Benjamin Netanyahu from attending cabinet meetings, but continued to participate by phone.

=== Command and control ===
As of 2019, it is believed that fundamental decisions about nuclear command and control, e.g. nuclear launch authority, must be made by two people, the Prime Minister of Israel and the Minister of Defense. In the event one person holds both roles, a second minister must be named who is familiar with Israel's "strategic procedures" (a euphemism for nuclear weapons). It is presumed that since 2003, Israel has integrated cyberwarfare into its NC3 system (nuclear command, control, and communications), dubbed an NC4 system. It is believed that in the Israel developed and installed permissive action links on its warheads in the 1980s and 1990s.

Traditionally, Israel used a "two-tier" system, in which nuclear weapons were kept disassembled, physically separated from launch vehicles, and under the custodianship of a civilian organization, while the military operated the delivery systems. However, since the advent of Israel's nuclear-capable submarine fleet, it is unclear if the submarines carry nuclear weapons on board, if those weapons are assembled, and if their custodianship is civilian.

In 1966, the dormant Israel Atomic Energy Commission was reestablished as a front organization for the highly classified organization that headquarters the Israeli nuclear weapons program, the Scientific Authority (Hebrew: מינהל מדיי, romanized: Minhal Madaii). It would control the two main hubs of weapons development, KAMAG at the Negev center in charge of fissile material production, and the Weapons Development Authority (now Rafael Advanced Defense Systems) in charge of weaponization.

=== Doctrine ===
Israel's nuclear doctrine is shaped by its lack of strategic depth: a subsonic fighter jet could cross the 72 kilometres (39 nmi) from the Jordan River to the Mediterranean Sea in just 4 minutes. It additionally relies on a reservist-based military which magnifies civilian and military losses in its small population. Israel tries to compensate for these weaknesses by emphasising intelligence, maneuverability and firepower.

As a result, its strategy is based on the premise that it cannot afford to lose a single war, and thus must prevent them by maintaining deterrence, including the option of preemption. If these steps are insufficient, it seeks to prevent escalation and determine a quick and decisive war outside of its borders.

Strategically, Israel's long-range missiles, nuclear-capable aircraft, and possibly its submarines present an effective second strike deterrence against unconventional and conventional attack, and if Israel's defences fail and its population centers are threatened, the Samson Option, an all-out attack against an adversary, would be employed. Its nuclear arsenal can also be used tactically to destroy military units on the battlefield.

Although nuclear weapons are viewed as the ultimate guarantor of Israeli security, as early as the 1960s the country has avoided building its military around them, instead pursuing absolute conventional superiority so as to forestall a last-resort nuclear engagement.

According to historian Avner Cohen, Israel first articulated an official policy on the use of nuclear weapons in 1966, which revolved around four "red lines" that could lead to a nuclear response:

1. A successful military penetration into populated areas within Israel's post-1949 (pre-1967) borders.
2. The destruction of the Israeli Air Force.
3. The exposure of Israeli cities to massive and devastating air attacks or to possible chemical or biological attacks.
4. The use of nuclear weapons against Israeli territory.

=== Deployment ===
Seymour Hersh alleges weapons were deployed on several occasions. On October 8, 1973, just after the start of the Yom Kippur War, Golda Meir and her closest aides decided to put eight nuclear armed F-4s at Tel Nof Airbase on 24-hour alert and as many nuclear missile launchers at Sdot Micha Airbase operational as possible. Seymour Hersh adds that the initial target list that night "included the Egyptian and Syrian military headquarters near Cairo and Damascus". This nuclear alert was meant not only as a means of precaution, but to push the Soviets to restrain the Arab offensive and to convince the US to begin sending supplies. One later report said that a Soviet intelligence officer did warn the Egyptian chief of staff, and colleagues of US National Security Advisor Henry Kissinger said that the threat of a nuclear exchange caused him to urge for a massive Israeli resupply. Hersh points out that before Israel obtained its own satellite capability, it engaged in espionage against the United States to obtain nuclear targeting information on Soviet targets.

After Iraq attacked Israel with Scud missiles during the 1991 Gulf War, Israel went on full-scale nuclear alert and mobile nuclear missile launchers were deployed. In the buildup to the United States 2003 invasion of Iraq, there were concerns that Iraq would launch an unconventional weapons attack on Israel. After discussions with President George W. Bush, the then Israeli prime minister Ariel Sharon warned "If our citizens are attacked seriously—by a weapon of mass destruction, chemical, biological or by some mega-terror attack act—and suffer casualties, then Israel will respond." Israeli officials interpreted President Bush's stance as allowing a nuclear Israeli retaliation on Iraq, but only if Iraq struck before the U.S. military invasion.

Israeli military and nuclear doctrine increasingly focused on preemptive war against any possible attack with conventional, chemical, biological or nuclear weapons, or even a potential conventional attack on Israel's weapons of mass destruction.

Louis René Beres, who contributed to Project Daniel, urges that Israel continue and improve these policies, in concert with the increasingly preemptive nuclear policies of the United States, as revealed in the Doctrine for Joint Nuclear Operations.

=== Maintaining nuclear superiority ===
Alone or with other nations, Israel has used diplomatic and military efforts as well as covert action to prevent other Middle Eastern countries from acquiring nuclear weapons.

==== Iraq ====
Mossad agents triggered explosions in April 1979 at a French production plant near Toulon, damaging two reactor cores destined for Iraqi reactors. Mossad agents may also have been behind the assassinations of an Egyptian nuclear engineer in Paris as well as two Iraqi engineers, all working for the Iraqi nuclear program.

On June 7, 1981, Israel launched an air strike destroying the breeder reactor at Osirak, Iraq, in Operation Opera.

Mossad may have also assassinated professor Gerald Bull, an artillery expert, who was leading the Project Babylon supergun for Saddam Hussein in the 1980s, which was capable of delivering a tactical nuclear payload.

==== Pakistan ====
During the 1980s, Israel made plans in cooperation with India to strike the Khan Research Laboratories in Kahuta, Pakistan, using Israeli Air Force planes operating from an airfield in Jamnagar, India. The attack never occurred as Indian officials feared full and possibly nuclear retaliation from Pakistan, while Israel would be unaffected, leading them to not grant use of the airfield.

==== Syria ====
On September 6, 2007, Israel launched an air strike dubbed Operation Orchard against a target in the Deir ez-Zor region of Syria. While Israel refused to comment, unnamed US officials said Israel had shared intelligence with them that North Korea was cooperating with Syria on some sort of nuclear facility. Both Syria and North Korea denied the allegation and Syria filed a formal complaint with the United Nations. The International Atomic Energy Agency concluded in May 2011 that the destroyed facility was "very likely" an undeclared nuclear reactor. Journalist Seymour Hersh speculated that the Syrian air strike might have been intended as a trial run for striking alleged Iranian nuclear weapons facilities.

==== Iran ====
On January 7, 2007, The Sunday Times reported that Israel had drawn up plans to destroy three Iranian nuclear facilities. Israel swiftly denied the specific allegation and analysts expressed doubts about its reliability. Also in 2007 Israel pressed for United Nations economic sanctions against Iran, and repeatedly threatened to launch a military strike on Iran if the United States did not do so first.

Israel is widely believed to be behind the assassination of a number of Iranian nuclear scientists. The death of the Iranian physicist Ardeshir Hassanpour, who may have been involved in the nuclear program, has been claimed by the intelligence group Stratfor to have also been a Mossad assassination.

The 2010 Stuxnet malware is widely believed to have been developed by Israel and the United States. It spread worldwide but appears to have been designed to target the Natanz Enrichment Plant, where it reportedly destroyed up to 1,000 centrifuges.

On June 13, 2025, Israel attacked Iranian nuclear facilities at Fordow, Isfahan and Natanz as part of the June 2025 Israeli strikes on Iran.

=== Nuclear Non-Proliferation Treaty and United Nations' Resolutions ===
Israel was originally expected to sign the 1968 Nuclear Non-Proliferation Treaty (NPT) and on June 12, 1968, Israel voted in favor of the treaty in the UN General Assembly.

However, when the invasion of Czechoslovakia in August by the Soviet Union delayed ratification around the world, Israel's internal division and hesitation over the treaty became public. The Johnson administration attempted to use the sale of 50 F-4 Phantoms to pressure Israel to sign the treaty that fall, culminating in a personal letter from Lyndon Johnson to Israeli prime minister Levi Eshkol. But by November Johnson had backed away from tying the F-4 sale with the NPT after a stalemate in negotiations, and Israel would neither sign nor ratify the treaty. After the series of negotiations, U.S. assistant secretary of defense for international security Paul Warnke was convinced that Israel already possessed nuclear weapons. In 2007 Israel sought an exemption to non-proliferation rules in order to import atomic material legally.

In 1996, the United Nations General Assembly passed a resolution calling for the establishment of a nuclear-weapon-free zone in the region of the Middle East. Arab nations and annual conferences of the International Atomic Energy Agency (IAEA) repeatedly have called for application of IAEA safeguards and the creation of a nuclear-free Middle East. Arab nations have accused the United States of practicing a double standard in criticizing Iran's nuclear program while ignoring Israel's possession of nuclear weapons. According to a statement by the Arab League, Arab states will withdraw from the NPT if Israel acknowledges having nuclear weapons but refuses to open its facilities to international inspection and destroy its arsenal.

In a statement to the May 2009 preparatory meeting for the 2010 NPT Review Conference, the US delegation reiterated the longstanding US support for "universal adherence to the NPT", but uncharacteristically named Israel among the four countries that have not done so. An unnamed Israeli official dismissed the suggestion that it would join the NPT and questioned the effectiveness of the treaty. The Washington Times reported that this statement threatened to derail the 40-year-old secret agreement between the US and Israel to shield Israel's nuclear weapons program from international scrutiny. According to Avner Cohen, by not stating that Israel has atomic weapons, the US avoids having to sanction the country for violating American non-proliferation law. Cohen, author of Israel and the Bomb, argued that acknowledging its nuclear program would allow Israel to take part constructively in efforts to control nuclear weapons.

The Final Document of the 2010 NPT Review Conference called for a conference in 2012 to implement a resolution of the 1995 NPT Review Conference that called for the establishment of a Middle East Zone free of weapons of mass destruction. The United States joined the international consensus for Final Document, but criticized the section on the Middle East resolution for singling out Israel as the only state in the region that is not party to the NPT, while at the same time ignoring Iran's "longstanding violation of the NPT and UN Security Council Resolutions."

In May 2026, 30 Democratic members of the United States House of Representatives sent a letter to Secretary of State Marco Rubio requesting greater transparency regarding Israel's undeclared nuclear weapons capabilities. The lawmakers, led by Representative Joaquin Castro, called for an end to long-standing U.S. policy of ambiguity on the issue, arguing that it complicates nuclear non-proliferation policy in the Middle East and limits congressional oversight of regional nuclear risks amid the ongoing Israel–Iran conflict. They also stated that the United States should apply consistent standards of transparency regarding nuclear weapons capabilities across all countries.

== Threats during the Gaza war ==
During the Gaza war, Israeli and US officials have made statements about nuclear weapons and Gaza characterized as genocidal intent. Israeli security analysts have also argued these statements undermine Israeli nuclear ambiguity.

On 9 October 2023, Likud member of the Knesset Tally Gotliv made a Twitter post calling for a nuclear-armed Jericho missile "strategic alert" and the use of a "doomsday weapon". She continued that "Only an explosion that shakes the Middle East will restore this country’s dignity, strength and security!".

Minister of Heritage Amihai Eliyahu responded "That's one way." to an interviewer asking if Israel should drop "some kind of atomic bomb" on Gaza "to kill everyone”. His remarks were criticized by the Israeli opposition, a number of Arab countries, Iran, and China. Palestinian foreign minister Riyad al-Maliki filed a complaint with the International Atomic Energy Agency arguing the statement was "an official recognition that Israel possesses nuclear weapons and weapons of mass destruction". Eliyahu was ostensibly suspended from the Israeli cabinet by Israeli prime minister Benjamin Netanyahu, but continued to participate in meetings by phone. Eliyahu's father Shmuel Eliyahu, the Chief Rabbi of the city of Safed, repeated the statement: "A nuclear bomb on Gaza is indeed an option!"

US Republican congressmen Lindsey Graham, Tim Walberg, and Randy Fine were criticized for referring to the atomic bombings of Hiroshima and Nagasaki to support the Israeli bombing of the Gaza Strip.

Nuclear weapons scholar Vincent Intondi argued that US and Israeli officials' statements are liable to prosecution under the Genocide Convention's incitement clause, but the convention obligates countries to prosecute incitement within their own borders.

== See also ==
- Israel and weapons of mass destruction
- Shimon Peres Negev Nuclear Research Center
- France and weapons of mass destruction § History
- Jericho (missile)
- Dolphin-class submarine
- Tel Nof Airbase § Nuclear weapons
- Hatzerim Airbase § Nuclear weapons
- Vela incident
- Operation Opera
- Operation Outside the Box
- Stuxnet
- Assassinations of Iranian nuclear scientists
- Twelve-Day War

== Bibliography ==
- Brower, Kenneth S (February 1997), "A Propensity for Conflict: Potential Scenarios and Outcomes of War in the Middle East", Jane's Intelligence Review (special report) (14): 14–15
- Burrows, William E; Windrem, Robert (1994), Critical mass: the dangerous race for superweapons in a fragmenting world, Simon and Schuster, ISBN 978-0-671-74895-1
- Cohen, Avner (1998), Israel and the Bomb, New York: Columbia University Press, ISBN 978-0-231-10482-1
- Cordesman, Anthony H (1996), Perilous prospects: The peace process and the Arab-Israeli military balance, Boulder, CO: Westview Press, ISBN 978-0-8133-2939-0
- Ben-David, Alon (October 1, 2009), "Israel seeks sixth Dolphin in light of Iranian 'threat'", Jane's Defence Weekly
- Farr, Warner D (September 1999), The Third Temple's holy of holies: Israel's nuclear weapons, The Counterproliferation Papers, Future Warfare Series, vol. 2, USAF Counterproliferation Center, Air War College, Air University, Maxwell Air Force Base
- Hersh, Seymour M. (1991), The Samson Option: Israel's Nuclear Arsenal and American Foreign Policy, New York: Random House, ISBN 978-0-394-57006-8
- Kaku, Michio (1993), "Contingency Plans: Nuclear Weapons after the Cold War", in Bennis, Phyllis; Moushabeck, Michel (eds.), Altered States: A Reader in the New World Order, New York, New York: Olive Branch Press, ISBN 978-1-56656-115-0
- Milhollin, Gary (Winter 1987–1988), "Heavy Water Cheaters", Foreign Policy (69): 100–119, doi:10.2307/1148590, JSTOR 1148590
- Pry, Peter (1984), Israel's Nuclear Arsenal, Boulder, Colorado: Westview, ISBN 978-0-7099-2079-3
- Spector, Leonard S; McDonough, Mark G; Medeiros, Evan S (1995), Tracking nuclear proliferation: A guide in maps and charts, Washington, DC: Carnegie Endowment for International Peace, ISBN 978-0-87003-061-1
- Valéry, Nicholas (December 12, 1974), "Israel's Silent Gamble with the Bomb", New Scientist, vol. 64, pp. 807–809
- Weissman, Stephen 'Steve'; Krosney, Herbert (1981), The Islamic bomb: the nuclear threat to Israel and the Middle East, New York, NY: Times Books, p. 275, ISBN 978-0-8129-0978-4
