= What Must Be Said =

2012 prose poem by Günter Grass

What must be said
- by Günter Grass
- Original title: Was gesagt werden muss
- Translator: Breon Mitchell (English translation used in this article)
- First published in: Süddeutsche Zeitung, La Repubblica, El País
- Country: Germany
- Language: German
- Subject(s): Iran–Israel relations, nuclear weapons of Israel, nuclear proliferation
- Genre: Prose poetry
- Publication date: 4 April 2012
- Lines: 66

"What Must Be Said" (German: Was gesagt werden muss) is a 2012 prose poem by the German writer Günter Grass, recipient of the 1999 Nobel Prize in Literature. The poem discusses an alleged threat of annihilation of the Iranian people and the writer's fears that Germany's delivery to Israel of a sixth Dolphin-class submarine capable of carrying nuclear warheads might facilitate an eventual Israeli nuclear attack on Iran, and thus involve his country in a foreseeable crime.

The poem was first published on 4 April 2012 by the Süddeutsche Zeitung, La Repubblica and El País, triggering four days later the declaration by Eli Yishai, the Israeli Minister for the Interior, that Grass, who had visited Israel in 1967 and 1971, was now persona non grata.

== Content ==
The poem is written in prose and consists of 69 lines in 9 unrhymed stanzas. The basic theme is that it is hypocritical to blame Iran unilaterally for perhaps also having a desire to acquire nuclear weapons when Israel itself has a "growing nuclear potential". Grass adopts the assumption that Israel is planning a "first strike" preventive war against Iran that could wipe out the Iranian peoples. He deplores the fact that Germany is furnishing Israel with a submarine capable of delivering nuclear bombs, and says no one in the West dares to mention Israel in connection with nuclear weaponry. The author assesses that an attack on Iran would be a crime, to which Germany would become an accomplice.

A noticeable stylistic theme is that in six of the nine sentences, the theme of silence is repeated as "silence", "general silence", or "forbidding myself to name [the country]". The author first asks himself "Why [was] I silent for so long?" and answers it with "because my heritage, which is forever burdened by an unclearing stain, prohibits, to deliver this fact as a spoken truth to the state of Israel, to which I feel ... and want to stay connected". Continuing, he is demanding that no further German "submarine shall be delivered to Israel, with the specialty of delivering annihilating warheads to where the existence of one single nuclear bomb is unproven". These are delivered by "my country, which is time after time caught-up ... for its very own and unprecedented crimes, ... on a pure commercial basis, even though declared with fast tongue as reparation". He continues that he feels it as an "incriminating lie and constraint". to keep the "general silence about these facts", even though it "promises punishment as soon as it is broached"—the common verdict: "Anti-Semitism".

He further criticises the "Western hypocrisy" and hopes "that many will want to get rid of their silence, to demand from the initiator of this recognizable danger [Israel], to abstinence from violence". Finally he demands that an "unhindered and permanent control of the Israeli nuclear arsenal and the Iranian nuclear complexes by an international authority will be allowed by the governments of both countries"; only this way "Israelis, Palestinians, and even more everybody who is living face to face as enemies in this region occupied by delusion and craziness, and last not least ourselves, can be helped".

== Reception ==
=== Political controversy ===
Translations were published in a number of countries, generating significant controversy, particularly in Germany and Israel. This intensified on 8 April, four days after publication, when Eli Yishai, Israel's Minister for the Interior, banned Grass from entering the country. The decision was based on a 1952 law barring former members of Nazi organizations from entering Israel. Yishai said: "Grass's poems are an attempt to guide the fire of hate toward the State of Israel and the Israeli people, and to advance the ideas of which he was a public partner in the past, when he wore the uniform of the SS." This was a reference to Grass's acknowledgement in 2006 that he had been drafted into the Waffen-SS when he was 17 years old. The Israeli newspaper, Haaretz, said the decision "smacked of populism". In announcing the ban, Yishai also demanded that the author should have his Nobel Prize withdrawn. The Swedish Academy responded by stating that no discussion has, or will, take place concerning the rescinding of his award.

Israel's Foreign Minister Avigdor Lieberman criticized the "egoism of so-called Western intellectuals, who are willing to sacrifice the Jewish people on the altar of crazy anti-Semites for a second time, just to sell a few more books or gain recognition" and demanded that European leaders condemn the work.

Avi Primor, former Israeli ambassador to the European Union and to Germany, argued that the poem violated a taboo of German public discourse, where there is a fear of criticizing Israel; Grass was drawing attention to the hypocrisy of saying behind closed doors what cannot be said in public. Primor added that there is no anti-Semitism in Grass's work, that his publications have been opposed to Nazism, and that it is a mistake to link the poem to his membership of the Waffen-SS, given that he repudiated Nazi ideology. "It is important to pay attention to the message of the poem," he said.

German Health Minister Daniel Bahr told Die Welt that the Israeli government's reaction had been "totally excessive". Regarding the poem itself, he said that it was "sad to see that someone who has experienced all the controversies of post-war Germany remains marked by so much prejudice and stubbornness".

Philipp Missfelder, chairman of the Junge Union and a member of the Bundestag, said the poem "plays into the hands of the Iranian aggressor. That is fatal and goes well beyond a so-called friendly critique."

The Iranian deputy culture minister, Javad Shamaqdari, offered effusive praise of the poem in a letter to Grass: "I have read your literary work, highly responsible both from a human and historical point of view, and I found it extremely timely. Telling the truth in such a way may truly awaken the west's silent and dormant conscience". And Iran's state-owned Press TV said: "Never before in Germany's postwar history has a prominent intellectual attacked Israel in such a courageous way. Metaphorically speaking, the poet has launched a deadly lyrical strike against Israel."

In an interview with the German newspaper, Welt am Sonntag, Israeli Prime Minister Benjamin Netanyahu said that the poem was "shameful" and constituted a "collapse of moral judgment", and that Grass had "created a perfect moral misrepresentation...where the firefighter and not the arsonist becomes the true danger".

=== Response from literary figures ===
Hamid Dabashi, who teaches literature at New York's Columbia University, argued that the poem's importance lay in the context of the author being ostracized by the content of his own work: "The daring imagination of Günter Grass' poem—a heroically tragic act precisely because the poet is implicated in the moral outrage of his own poem—is significant precisely because it captures this German and by extension European logic/madness of colonial conquest and moral cannibalism."

Klaus Staeck, president of the Berlin academy of art, told reporters, "It's got to be possible to speak openly without being denounced as an enemy of Israel."

In an interview with the Frankfurter Allgemeine Zeitung, literary critic Marcel Reich-Ranicki called Grass's text "a disgusting poem", opining that its sole purpose was to cause a scandal and draw attention to himself, and that he knew attacking Jews would achieve this.

The Hebrew Writers Association in Israel threatened to call for International PEN to distance itself from Grass.

An Israeli poet and Holocaust survivor, Itamar Yaoz-Kest, published a poem in response, entitled "The Right to Exist: a Poem-Letter to the German Author", which addresses Grass by name. It contains the line: "If you force us yet again to descend from the face of the Earth to the depths of the Earth—let the Earth roll toward the Nothingness." This is seen as referring to the Samson Option, Israel's alleged deterrence strategy of massive retaliation with nuclear weapons as a "last resort" against nations whose military attacks threaten its existence. D. G. Myers said that it gave expression to a "new European anti-Semitism that pretends it is merely anti-Zionism".

=== Other responses ===
Grass has struck a nerve with the broader public, articulating frustrations with Israel in Germany that are frequently expressed in private but rarely in public. Demonstrators in several German cities showed their support for Grass during the annual Ostermärsche (anti-war protests).

On 7 April, someone in Göttingen wrote "shut your mouth" in red paint on a sculpture commissioned and donated by Grass to commemorate free speech.

The Guardian's Jerusalem correspondent, Harriet Sherwood, wrote: "Amid the torrent of denunciation, some Israeli commentators said Grass had raised an important issue and that criticism of Israeli policies was routinely portrayed as antisemitism."

The poem was defended by a number of Jewish and Israeli individuals. The Israeli decision was criticized in an editorial in Haaretz, Israel's oldest daily newspaper was headed, "Israel has reacted with hysteria over Gunter Grass."

Journalist Larry Derfner wrote: "Günter Grass told the truth, he was brave in telling it, he was brave in admitting that he'd been drafted into the Waffen SS as a teenager, and by speaking out against an Israeli attack on Iran, he's doing this country a great service at some personal cost while most Israelis and American Jews are safely following the herd behind Bibi [Netanyahu] over the cliff."

Several distinct views were run in Haaretz. Writer Gideon Levy said of Grass and the writer José Saramago, another critic of Israeli policies: "After we denounce the exaggeration, after we shake off the unjustified part of the charge, we must listen to these great people. They are not anti-Semites, they are expressing the opinion of many people. Instead of accusing them we should consider what we did that led them to express it.

In the same newspaper, Anshel Pfeffer argued that: "Logic and reason are useless when a highly intelligent man, a Nobel laureate no less, does not understand that his membership in an organization that planned and carried out the wholesale genocide of millions of Jews disqualifies him from criticizing the descendants of those Jews for developing a weapon of last resort that is the insurance policy against someone finishing the job his organization began. What could be more self-evident?"

Ravit Hecht wrote that Grass had been the object of an 'unbridled assault' for thinking differently, and criticised the ease with which the Holocaust is pulled out, desecrating its memory, every time something disturbs the elected leadership or "the masses of Israelis" in order to arouse nationalist feelings and make political capital out of them, something more troubling than Grass' disparaging poem.

=== Grass's rejoinder ===
Grass told the Süddeutsche Zeitung that the poem was aimed at the current Israeli government, not the country as a whole. He voiced particular criticism of the government's policy of continuing to build settlements despite a United Nations' resolution. He said that, with hindsight, he should have made it clearer that it was the government he was criticizing. Netanyahu, he said, was damaging Israel. He added: "I have often supported Israel, I have often been in the country and want the country to exist and at last find peace with its neighbours." On 11 April, in an article for the Süddeutsche Zeitung, Grass compared the ban on his entering Israel to his treatment by dictatorships in Myanmar and East Germany.

== Translations ==
Translations of the poem were published in national newspapers and their websites from 5 April 2012. In Norway, a national newspaper published a translation on 10 April. The poem has already been translated into at least 17 major languages.

== See also ==
- Criticism of Israel
- Nuclear weapons of Israel
- Views on the nuclear program of Iran
