= Last-warning shot =

Concept in French nuclear doctrine

The last-warning shot (French: tir d'ultime avertissement), sometimes called nuclear warning shot, is a concept in French nuclear doctrine about the use of nuclear weapons. It consists of a single nuclear strike using a "pre-strategic" nuclear weapon or a stripped-down strategic one, as a final warning to an opponent before the full use of strategic nuclear weapons. Contrary to the common meaning of the term "warning shot", supposed to be purposefully harmless, the strike is meant to directly target an opposing military force or an inhabited area. When first formulated, it was understood to involve a nuclear strike on West Germany targeted at an invading Warsaw Pact army, but was always defined ambiguously on purpose. The last-warning shot has remained a central element of French nuclear doctrine after the end of the Cold War, and is unique among other nuclear-armed states.
