= United Nations Security Council Resolution 487 =

UN Security Council Resolution 487
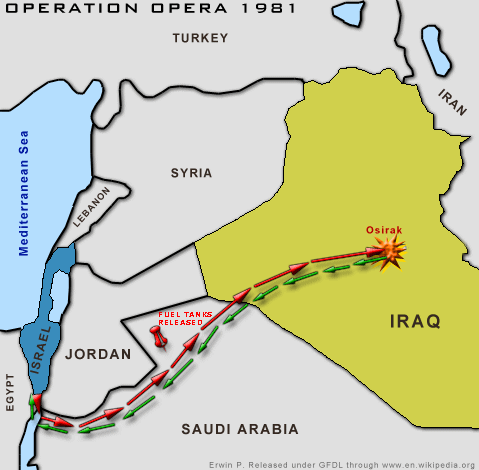
- Operation Opera
- Date: 19 June 1981
- Meeting no.: 2,288
- Code: S/RES/487 (Document)
- Subject: Iraq–Israel
- Voting summary: 15 voted for; None voted against; None abstained
- Result: Adopted

Security Council composition
- Permanent members: China; France; Soviet Union; United Kingdom; United States
- Non-permanent members: East Germany; Ireland; Japan; Mexico; Niger; Panama; Philippines; Spain; Tunisia; Uganda

United Nations Security Council Resolution 487, adopted unanimously on 19 June 1981, having noted representations from Iraq and the International Atomic Energy Agency (IAEA), the Council condemned an attack by Israel on an IAEA-approved nuclear site in Iraq.

The resolution went on to call for a cessation of hostile activities, entitled Iraq to claim for compensation, and called on Israel to urgently place its nuclear facilities under IAEA safeguards.

== Background ==
In the late 1970s, Iraq purchased an "Osiris class" nuclear reactor from France. Israeli military intelligence assumed this was for the purpose of plutonium production to further an Iraqi nuclear weapons program, in spite of it being built within the terms of the Treaty on the Non-Proliferation of Nuclear Weapons and under the inspection regime of the IAEA.

Israeli intelligence also believed that the summer of 1981 would be the last chance to destroy the reactor without exposing the Iraqi civilian population to nuclear fallout. After that point, the reactor would be loaded with nuclear fuel.

On 7 June 1981, a squadron of Israeli F-16A fighter aircraft, with an escort of F-15As, bombed and heavily damaged the Osirak reactor as part of Operation Opera.

This resolution was passed following 10 Security Council meetings about the incident and Israel's nuclear weapons policy, and specifically called for Israel to put its own facilities under the safeguards of the IAEA.

== See also ==
- Begin doctrine
- Iraq and weapons of mass destruction
- Iraq–Israel relations
- List of United Nations Security Council Resolutions 401 to 500 (1976–1982)
