= Project Daniel =

Israeli threat assessment of Middle Eastern countries

Project Daniel was a 2003 Israeli project, commissioned to assess the threat to the nation of Israel from other states in the Middle East, drawing particular attention to Iran, with Iran's nuclear program in mind. It was prepared by a high-powered team of Israeli foreign policy and military experts. The report was submitted to Israeli Prime Minister, Ariel Sharon, and was discussed between Israel, the United States, and NATO.

It surmised that the "principal existential threat to Israel at the present time is a conventional war mounted against it by a coalition of Arab states and/or Iran".

== Members ==
The six members of the Project Daniel board were Professor Louis René Beres and Doctor Rand H. Fishbein (a former Special Assistant for National Security Affairs to Senator Daniel K. Inouye) from the United States, Naaman Belkind, former assistant to the Israeli Deputy Minister of Defense for Special Means, Major General Professor Yitzhak Ben Yisrael, Doctor Adir Pridor, former head of Military Analysis, and Colonel Yoash Tzidon, from Israel.

== Summary of recommendations ==
The project discussed the danger from 'weapons of mass destruction' (WMDs), including nuclear, chemical and biological weapons, particularly as Israel has such a high concentration of population.

The recommendations of the report were that Israel should do anything possible to prevent an anti-Israeli coalition from being formed, and from that coalition gaining control of WMDs. It suggested Israel should retain the option of carrying out preemptive strikes, describing them as 'anticipatory self-defense'. The strikes would be a combination of air strikes and selective covert operations by ground forces at certain critical (and publicly unnamed) locations.

It also recommended that Israel should retain its current policy of deliberate ambiguity regarding its nuclear status. If, at a later date, other states in the Middle East (particularly Iran) were to acquire nuclear technology that Israel perceived as a threat, then the Daniel Project recommended limited disclosure of Israel's nuclear weapons capacity, as a deterrent.

The final recommendation was that Israel should provide constructive support to the United States' war on terrorism, particularly in counter-terrorism operations.

== See also ==
- Israel and weapons of mass destruction
- Samson Option
- Dahiya doctrine
- Preemptive war
- Hannibal Directive
