= Martin van Creveld =

Israeli military historian and theorist

- מרטין לוי ון קרפלד
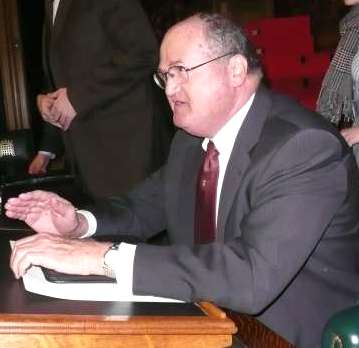
- Van Creveld at the UK House of Commons (2008)
- Born: 5 March 1946 (age 80); Rotterdam, Netherlands
- Education: London School of Economics Hebrew University of Jerusalem
- Scientific career
- Fields: Military history Military theory
- Thesis: Greece and Yugoslavia in Hitler's strategy, 1940–1941 (1971)
- Website: www.martin-van-creveld.com

Martin Levi van Creveld (Hebrew: מרטין לוי ון קרפלד, pronounced [ˈmaʁtin leˈvi van ˈkʁefeld]; born 5 March 1946) is an Israeli military historian and theorist.

== Life and career ==
Van Creveld was born in the Dutch city of Rotterdam to a Jewish family. His parents, Leon and Margaret, managed to evade the Gestapo during World War II.

In 1950, his family immigrated to Israel, and Van Creveld grew up in Ramat Gan. From 1964 to 1969, he studied history at the Hebrew University of Jerusalem and earned an M.A. From 1969 to 1971, he studied history at the London School of Economics and received a PhD. His thesis was titled "Greece and Yugoslavia in Hitler's strategy, 1940–1941".

Van Creveld's doctoral dissertation on Hitler's strategy in the Balkans during the early years of World War II was published as a book in 1973: "Hitler's Strategy, 1940–41. The Balkan Clue." After completing his PhD in 1971, van Creveld returned to Israel and began teaching at the Hebrew University of Jerusalem. He became a professor in 1988. In 2007, he retired from teaching at Hebrew University, and began teaching at Tel Aviv University's Security Studies Program.

Van Creveld has been married twice and has three children. He lives in Mevaseret Zion.

== Books ==
Van Creveld is the author of 33 books on military history, strategy, and other topics, of which Command in War (1985), Supplying War: Logistics from Wallenstein to Patton (1977, 2nd edition 2004), The Transformation of War (1991), The Sword and the Olive (1998) and The Rise and Decline of the State (1999) are among the best known.

=== The Transformation of War ===
His 1991 book, The Transformation of War: The Most Radical Reinterpretation of Armed Conflict Since Clausewitz (UK: On Future War), was translated into French, German (including a new German edition in 2004), Russian, and Spanish. In this treatise on military theory, van Creveld develops what he calls his non-trinitarian theory of warfare, which he juxtaposes to the famous work by von Clausewitz, Vom Kriege (On War). Van Creveld argues that von Clausewitz's famous "trinity of people, army, and government" is an obsolete socio-political construct centered exclusively on the state, which is rapidly transitioning away from being the key player in war. Clausewitz's approach to warfare was thus less applicable to the study of conflicts that face the modern analyst, which typically involve one or more non-state actors.

Van Creveld constructed a new "non-Clausewitzian" model for modern warfare, proposing five key issues in any war:

1. By whom war is fought – whether by states or by non-state actors
2. What war is all about – the relationships between the actors, and between them and the non-combatants
3. How war is fought – issues of strategy and tactics
4. What war is fought for – whether to enhance national power or as an end in itself
5. Why war is fought – the motivations of the individual soldier

In making this argument, van Creveld suggested that himself and two like thinkers, namely, British political scientist Mary Kaldor and British military historian John Keegan, be collectively referred to as leaders of the "New Wars" scholars. Central to the "New Wars" model were several additional criticisms of Clausewitz. They suggested that Clausewitz's best-known aphorism, that war is a continuation of politics by other means, is not only irrelevant today but also inapplicable historically.

The "New Wars" literature proved useful in identifying some characteristics of wars in the post-WWII and especially the immediate post-Cold War eras. Van Creveld noted that many of the wars fought after 1945 were low-intensity conflicts (LICs) which powerful states often lost. The book argues that we are seeing a decline of the nation-state, without a comparable decline in organized violence. Moreover, in his view, armies consistently train and equip to fight a conventional war, rather than the LICs they are most likely to face. Consequently, it is imperative that nation-states change the training of their armed forces and rethink their weapon procurement programs.

In a commander's quest for certainty in battlefield information, van Creveld popularized the term "directed telescope" to describe the use of specially selected and trusted officers as special agents or observers for the commander.

The book's contemporary influence is attested to by the fact that, through 2008, it was included on the list of required reading for United States Army officers, and (with Sun Tzu and von Clausewitz) the third non-American entry on the list. After objections from staunch scholars of von Clausewitz, the "New Wars" critique and its influence largely disintegrated. The idea that states were no longer key players seemed less relevant in the early 2010s, given renewed competition among Great Powers. The specific case in point was the rise of China as a globally dominant exporter and, in response, increasing unease about the perceived threat of Chinese economic warfare against the West.

==== Criticism ====
Concerning the "trinitarian" issue, historian Daniel Moran remarked in 2010 that van Creveld misrepresented von Clausewitz's famous metaphor as 'state against state and army against army' yet failed to include "the people", which was one of Clausewitz's three precepts about war, even while van Creveld acknowledged that "the people" constituted one-third of the trinitarian concept he was attempting to refute.

Christopher Bassford alleged that the actual components of Clausewitz's trinity are:

- primordial violence, hatred, and enmity, which are to be regarded as a blind natural force;
- the play of chance and probability, within which the creative spirit is free to roam; and
- its element of subordination, as an instrument of policy, which makes it subject to rational calculation (or, as in a later version of the paper, "mere intellect").

Bassford amplified Moran's critique by claiming that Clausewitz's definition of "trinity" never even mentioned the words 'people,' 'army,' and 'government' as part of the trinity's components, i.e. Bassford was highly critical of van Creveld and Keegan, for what he said was an assault on a position that Clausewitz never occupied.

A broader critical analysis of the "New Wars" writers is made in the 2005 conference proceedings of Clausewitz in the Twenty-First Century edited by Hew Strachan and Andreas Herberg-Rothe.

=== The Privileged Sex ===
In addition to his books on military history, van Creveld has written several books on other issues. The most prominent of these is perhaps his polemic The Privileged Sex (2013). In this self-published book, van Creveld argues that the systematic oppression of women (as claimed by feminists) is a myth unsupported by any serious data and that across modern cultures women tend to enjoy more social protections and privileges than men do, which more than offset any disadvantages women face.

== Views on current affairs ==
In addition to writing on military history, van Creveld also comments on contemporary politics.

=== Israeli military operations ===
In a TV interview in 2002, he expressed doubts as to the ability of the Israeli army to defeat the Palestinians during the Second Intifada:

They [Israeli soldiers] are very brave people... they are idealists... they want to serve their country and they want to prove themselves. The problem is that you cannot prove yourself against someone who is much weaker than yourself. They are in a lose-lose situation. If you are strong and fighting the weak, then if you kill your opponent then you are a scoundrel... if you let him kill you, then you are an idiot. So here is a dilemma which others have suffered before us, and for which as far as I can see there is simply no escape. Now the Israeli army has not by any means been the worst of the lot. It has not done what for instance the Americans did in Vietnam... it did not use napalm, it did not kill millions of people. So everything is relative, but by definition, to return to what I said earlier if you are strong and you are fighting the weak, then anything you do is criminal.

Van Creveld viewed the Second Lebanon War as a strategic success for Israel and a Hezbollah defeat. He was also highly critical of the Winograd Commission's report for its failure to note the many successes brought about by Israel's military campaign. He noted that Hezbollah "had the fight knocked out of it," lost hundreds of its members and that the organization was "thrown out of South Lebanon," replaced by "a fairly robust United Nations peacekeeping force." He also noted that as a result of the war, Israel is experiencing a level of calm on its Lebanon border not seen since the mid-1960s. More recently, in an article published in Infinity Journal in June 2011, titled "The Second Lebanon War: A Reassessment", Martin van Creveld argued that contrary to the common view, and despite "clumsy, heavy-handed, and slow" ground operations, the Second Lebanon War was a great victory for Israel. He states that as a result of the war, "since the middle of August 2006, all over southern Lebanon hardly a shot has been fired."

In an opinion piece published in The Jewish Daily Forward in 2010, van Creveld argued that the West Bank, far from being vital to Israel's security, is a territory "that Israel can easily afford to give up." Van Creveld contended that the West Bank offers no defense against ballistic missiles from Israel's two chief enemies, Iran and Syria. Furthermore, provided that it would be demilitarized in any future peace settlement with the Palestinians, the West Bank would act as a natural barrier impeding the advance of any army endeavoring to invade Israel by land from the east. Lastly, Israel could defend itself against terrorism from the West Bank by means of a wall coupled with offensive campaigns the likes of Operation Cast Lead and the Second Lebanon War, which successfully restored Israel's deterrence factor when the level of terrorism exceeded what Israel was willing to tolerate.

=== Iraq and Iran ===
In 2005, van Creveld made headlines when he said in an interview that the 2003 invasion of Iraq was "the most foolish war since Emperor Augustus in 9 BC [sic] sent his legions into Germany and lost them", a reference to the Battle of the Teutoburg Forest. His analysis included harsh criticism of the Bush administration, comparing the war to the Vietnam war. Moreover, he said that "Bush deserves to be impeached and, once he has been removed from office, put on trial."

In 2007, van Creveld commented that

Iran is the real victor in Iraq, and the world must now learn to live with a nuclear Iran the way we learned to live with the nuclear Soviet Union and a nuclear China.... We Israelis have what it takes to deter an Iranian attack. We are in no danger at all of having an Iranian nuclear weapon dropped on us.... thanks to the Iranian threat, we are getting weapons from the U.S. and Germany.

In a September 2003 interview in Elsevier, a Dutch weekly, on Israel and the dangers it faces from Iran, the Palestinians and world opinion van Creveld stated, referring to the Samson Option:

We possess several hundred atomic warheads and rockets and can launch them at targets in all directions, perhaps even at Rome. Most European capitals are targets for our air force…. We have the capability to take the world down with us. And I can assure you that that will happen before Israel goes under.

On 21 August 2004 edition of the International Herald Tribune van Creveld wrote, "Had the Iranians not tried to build nuclear weapons, they would be crazy."

Van Creveld has stated that the Israeli government has "vastly exaggerated the threat that a nuclear Iran poses to its security, as well as Israel's capacity to halt it."

=== Arab Spring ===
In an article co-authored with a Cambridge researcher of Middle Eastern history, Jason Pack, addressing the 2011 Libyan civil war, van Creveld challenged the media's tendency to portray the circumstances in Libya as being largely equivalent to those that formed the backdrop to the overthrow of Ben-Ali in Tunisia and Mubarak in Egypt earlier in the year. "The remarkable spread of the 2011 Arab revolts across the face of North Africa causes many journalists to portray the current Libyan uprising as fueled by similar factors to those at play in neighboring Tunisia and Egypt. There are more differences than similarities." Van Creveld noted that Tunisia and Egypt "have been coherent nation-states for well over a century," while Libyan society is still pervasively tribalist. He also observed that whereas the armies of Tunisia and Egypt could mediate the transitions between the old regimes and the new, "Libya lacks a professional, non-tribal army" that could function in such a role. Van Creveld blamed Gaddafi's son Saif al-Islam Gaddafi for squandering a crucial opportunity to restore order to the country and confidence – both domestic and international – in the Gaddafi regime.

In 2016, in a commentary for the German magazine Focus, Creveld advocated an alliance with the Assad regime. "If the West wants to win the war against the caliphate of terror, they cannot be picky about their allies". The regional conflict was not about a despot, but about a novel form of terrorism aiming at the dissolution of all state order and territorial boundaries in the whole region. Only the Alawite soldiers of the Assad regime were willing to die fighting the terrorists, whereas the European and American attempts to avoid bloodshed concentrating on airstrikes, were useless against Guerrilla troops as history had shown. Losing the war against IS and Al Nusra would have incalculable consequences for the Middle East and for Europe. In comparison, Assad would appear as the "lesser devil".

As early as 2013, again in the magazine Focus, he regarded support for Assad as important to avoid the destabilization of the Middle East as a whole. Assad would continue the war only to prevent a still larger carnage, the annihilation of the 1.2 million Alawites. "Instead of complaining about humanitarian concerns and arguing about arms deliveries to the rebels, the West should join Russia and press for a negotiation solution. If necessary, the West should help the rebels and allow Assad to stay on his post: he is the only person who can hold the country together." Van Creveld quoted Bismarck: "Politics is the choice between the bad and the worse." In a lecture at the Konrad-Adenauer-Stiftung in Brandenburg he pleaded to follow a "pragmatic path" in Syria.

In 2011, looking back at Bashar's father, he analyzed the strategy of Hafez Al-Assad against the town of Hama in 1982, then the center of the Muslim Brothers. Without this action, seen as extremely brutal and as a war crime by Creveld, Assad's regime would probably have been overthrown. Assad himself and many members of the Alawite community would have been killed. After Assad's removal, perhaps a stable regime would have been established by non-Alawite Muslims, or – the more likely variant in Martin van Creveld's view – there would have been no stable government at all. In this case, there would have been a war of everyone against everyone. "Judging from the experience in neighboring Beirut, such a civil war could have cost hundreds of thousands of people. And, according to what happened in Lebanon and Afghanistan, Syria could have developed into a place teeming with international terrorists of every direction."

== Published works ==
Books

- Hitler's Strategy 1940–1941: the Balkan Clue, Cambridge University Press, 1973, ISBN 0-521-20143-8
- Military Lessons of the Yom Kippur War: Historical Perspectives, Beverly Hills : Sage Publications, 1975, ISBN 0-8039-0562-9
- Supplying War: Logistics from Wallenstein to Patton, Cambridge University Press, 1977, ISBN 0-521-21730-X (2nd ed, 2004, ISBN 0-521-54657-5)
- Fighting Power: German and US Army performance, 1939–1945, Westport, Conn. : Greenwood Press, 1982, ISBN 0-313-23333-0
- Command in War, Cambridge, Mass. : Harvard University Press, 1985, ISBN 0-674-14440-6
- Technology and War: From 2000 B.C. to the Present, New York : Free Press, 1989, ISBN 0-02-933151-X (free paperback, 2001, ISBN 0-02-933153-6)
- The Training of Officers: From Military Professionalism to Irrelevance, New York : Free Press, 1990, ISBN 0-02-933152-8
- The Transformation of War, New York : Free Press, 1991, ISBN 0-02-933155-2
- Nuclear Proliferation and the Future of Conflict, New York : Free Press, 1993, ISBN 0-02-933156-0
- Air Power and Maneuver Warfare, with contributions from Kenneth S. Brower and Steven L. Canby, Alabama : Air University Press, 1994, ISBN 1-58566-050-7
- The Encyclopedia of Revolutions and Revolutionaries: From Anarchism to Zhou Enlai, New York : Facts on File, 1996, ISBN 0-8160-3236-X
- The Sword and the Olive: A Critical History of the Israeli Defense Force, New York : Public Affairs, 1998, ISBN 1-891620-05-3
- The Rise and Decline of the State, Cambridge University Press, 1999, ISBN 0-521-65629-X
- The Art of War: War and Military Thought, London : Cassell, 2000, ISBN 0-304-35264-0 (also New York : Collins/Smithsonian, 2005, ISBN 0-06-083853-1)
- Men, Women, and War, London : Cassell & Co., 2001, ISBN 0-304-35959-9
- Moshe Dayan, London : Weidenfeld & Nicolson, 2004 ISBN 0-297-84669-8
- Defending Israel: A Controversial Plan Toward Peace, New York : Thomas Dunne Books/St. Martin's Press, 2004, ISBN 0-312-32866-4
- Countering Modern Terrorism: History, Current Issues, and Future Threats : Proceedings of the Second International Security Conference, Berlin, 15–17 December 2004, with Katharina von Knop and Heinrich Neisser, Bielefeld : Wbv, W. Bertelsmann Verlag, 2005, ISBN 3-7639-3309-3
- The Changing Face of War: lessons of combat, from the Marne to Iraq, New York : Presidio Press, 2006, ISBN 978-0-89141-901-3
- The Culture of War, New York: Presidio Press, 2008, ISBN 978-0-345-50540-8
- The American Riddle (In Russian), Publisher: Irisen (Russia) 2008
- The Land of Blood and Honey, New York : St. Martin's Press, 2010, ISBN 978-0-312-59678-1
- The Age of Airpower, New York: Public Affairs, 2011, ISBN 978-1-58648-981-6
- The Privileged Sex, North Charleston, SC : CreateSpace Independent Publishing Platform (On-Demand Publishing LLC), 2013, ISBN 978-1484983126
- Wargames: From Gladiators to Gigabytes, Cambridge, Cambridge University Press, 2013, ISBN 978-1-107-03695-6
- Conscience: A Biography, London, Reaktion, 2015, ISBN 978-1-78023-454-0
- Equality: The Impossible Quest, Kouvola, Castalia House, 2015.
- "Clio and Me" An Intellectual Autobiography, Kouvola, Castalia, House, 2015.
- Pussycats: Why the Rest Keeps Beating the West—and What Can Be Done about It, CreateSpace, 2016.
- Hitler in Hell, Castalia House, 2017.
- More on War, Oxford University Press, 2017.
- Seeing into the Future: A Short History of Prediction, 2020.
