= Javad Shamaqdari =

Javad Shamaqdari جواد شمقدری
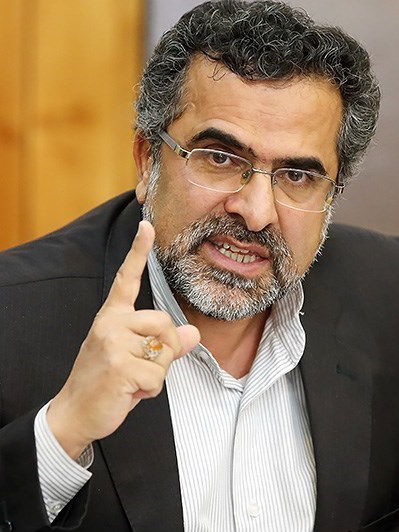
- Javad Shamaqdari in 2013
- Born: January 5, 1960 (age 66); Mashhad, Iran
- Occupations: Film director Screenwriter; Politician
- Years active: 1983–present
- Known for: Deputy Minister of Culture (2009–2013)
- Website: www.javad-shamaghdari.ir

Javad Shamaqdari (Persian: جواد شمقدری; born January 5, 1960) is an Iranian filmmaker and the former deputy culture minister of film under President Mahmoud Ahmadinejad. He has attacked the film 300 as psychological warfare and accused American 'cultural authorities' and Hollywood of attacking Iranian culture.

He has since rebuffed American film director Oliver Stone's offer to make a film about President Ahmadinejad, saying Iran would only allow it if an Iranian director was allowed to make a film about George W. Bush. Like 300, Stone's 2004 biopic Alexander was controversial in Iran for its depictions of ancient Persians.

In April 2012 he responded to "What Must Be Said" with a letter to Günter Grass: "I have read your literary work, highly responsible both from a human and historical point of view, and I found it extremely timely. Telling the truth in such a way may truly awaken the west's silent and dormant conscience".
