= Begin Doctrine =

Israeli anti-WMD counter-proliferation doctrine

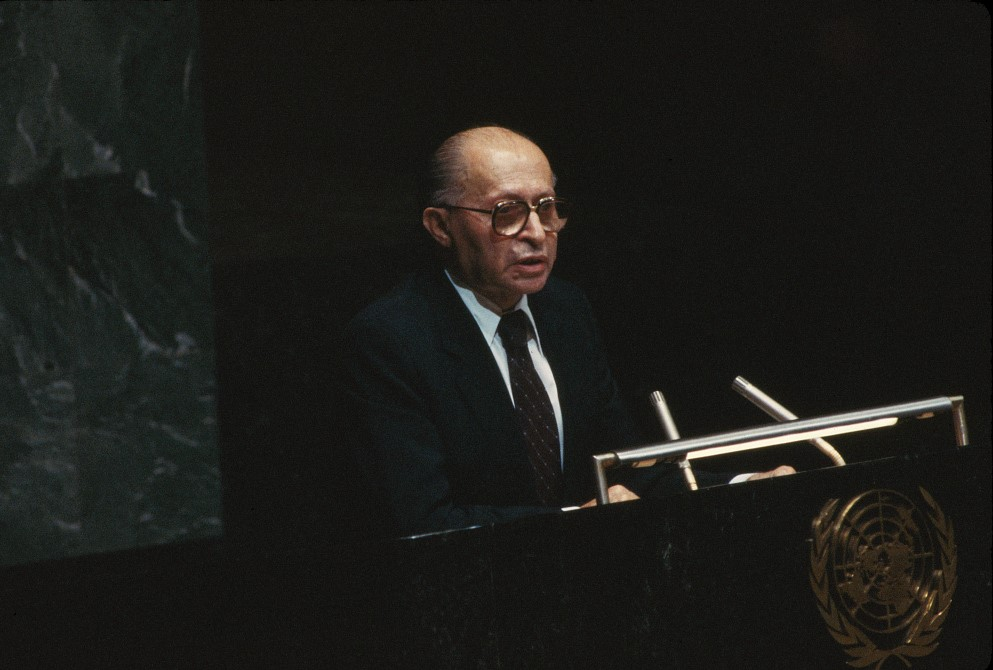
Menachem Begin speaking at the UN General Assembly (1982)

The Begin Doctrine is the common term for the Israeli government's preventive strike, counter-proliferation policy regarding their potential enemies' capability to possess weapons of mass destruction (WMD), particularly nuclear weapons.

The roots of this doctrine can be tracked at least to Operation Damocles in 1962. Secret and diplomatic operations against the Iraqi nuclear program were started by the Yitzhak Rabin government in the mid-1970s.

The doctrine itself was enunciated by Israeli Prime Minister Menachem Begin in June 1981, following Israel's attack on Iraq's nuclear reactor Osirak in Operation Opera. The doctrine remains a feature of Israeli security planning. The initial government statement on the incident stated: "On no account shall we permit an enemy to develop weapons of mass destruction against the people of Israel. We shall defend the citizens of Israel in good time and with all the means at our disposal."

Two days after the attack in a dramatic press conference in Tel Aviv, Prime Minister Begin took full responsibility for the operation, praised its execution as extraordinary, and justified it both on moral and legal grounds. Begin referred to the strike as an act of "anticipatory self-defense at its best." The message Begin conveyed was that the raid on Osirak was not a one-time operation, but rather a long-term national commitment. He ended his press conference with these words:

"We chose this moment: now, not later, because later may be too late, perhaps forever. And if we stood by idly, two, three years, at the most four years, and Saddam Hussein would have produced his three, four, five bombs. ... Then, this country and this people would have been lost, after the Holocaust. Another Holocaust would have happened in the history of the Jewish people. Never again, never again! Tell so your friends, tell anyone you meet, we shall defend our people with all the means at our disposal. We shall not allow any enemy to develop weapons of mass destruction turned against us."

On June 15, in a television interview on Face the Nation, Begin reiterated this doctrinal point: "This attack will be a precedent for every future government in Israel. ... Every future Israeli prime minister will act, in similar circumstances, in the same way."

Following the attack and Israeli government comments, many foreign powers opposed it and the United Nations Security Council unanimously passed United Nations Security Council Resolution 487 condemning the attacks.

== Operation Outside the Box ==
The Begin doctrine was followed in 2007 under Prime Minister Ehud Olmert with Operation Outside the Box against a Syrian nuclear facility. What was particularly notable about the attack on Syria was what occurred in its aftermath, the near total lack of international comment or criticism of Israel's action. This lack of reaction contrasted starkly to the international outcry that followed Israel's preventive strike in 1981 against Iraq's reactor. Foreign governments may have reserved comment because of the lack of information after the attack, but the Israeli government imposed a virtually total news blackout immediately after the raid that lasted for seven months. The U.S. government ordered officials with knowledge of the attack to keep it confidential. Syria was initially silent on the matter and then subsequently denied that the bombed target was a nuclear facility. The international silence continued even after the CIA made information public in April 2008.

== Iranian nuclear program ==
The doctrine continues to be in use as of 2009 under Prime Minister Benjamin Netanyahu, with regard to Iran and its nuclear capability. During this time the Iranian nuclear issue openly turned into Israel's number one security issue. Netanyahu, along with his key cabinet ministers, such as Minister of Defense Ehud Barak and Vice Premier Moshe Ya'alon, has repeatedly referred to a nuclear Iran, or even a nuclear-capable Iran, as an unacceptable and existential threat to Israel. With virtually all Israelis agreeing that Iran should be prevented from acquiring nuclear weapons, there is an ongoing bitter debate among policymakers on how best to achieve this goal. Whilst the U.S. and Europe implement economic sanctions and pursue diplomatic solutions, the Israeli government carries out covert operations, such as computer viruses, assassinations of key Iranian scientists and airstrikes designed to stall Iran's nuclear program.

In June 2025, Israel applied the Begin Doctrine through Operation Rising Lion, a comprehensive military campaign targeting Iran's nuclear infrastructure. Launched on June 13, the operation involved over 200 Israeli aircraft conducting airstrikes on approximately 100 sites across Iran, including key nuclear facilities in Natanz, Isfahan, and Tehran. These strikes aimed to substantially degrade Iran's nuclear capabilities, reportedly setting back the program by several years. High-ranking Iranian officials, including IRGC Commander Hossein Salami and military chief Mohammad Bagheri, were among those killed in the attacks.

The operation was preceded by extensive Mossad-led intelligence activities, which involved infiltrating Iran to sabotage air defense systems and establish covert drone bases near Tehran. These efforts facilitated the success of the airstrikes by compromising Iran's ability to respond effectively.

== See also ==
- Dahiya doctrine
- Hannibal Directive
- Israel and weapons of mass destruction
- Twelve-Day War
- Yinon Plan
