= Louis René Beres =

Swiss academic (born 1945)

Louis René Beres is emeritus professor of political science and international law at Purdue University in West Lafayette, Indiana. He was born on August 31, 1945, in Zürich, Switzerland, and earned his Ph.D. at Princeton University in 1971. Beres has written many books and currently also writes editorials for various major newspapers and magazines.

== Research ==
Beres has written twelve books and several hundred scholarly articles and monographs. He also lectures widely on matters of terrorism, strategy and international law, including at such Israeli venues as the Dayan Forum (with Maj. Gen. Avihu Ben-Nun); the National Security College (IDF); the Jaffee Center for Strategic Studies; The Begin-Sadat Center for Strategic Studies (Bar-Ilan University); Likud Chamber; Likud Security Group; and the Jerusalem Center for Public Affairs. As an expert on nuclear war and nuclear terrorism, he is closely involved with Israeli security issues at the highest levels. He was Chair of "Project Daniel," a group advising Israel's Prime Minister on existential nuclear questions. The group's final report, "Israel's Strategic Future", has been discussed in major media.

== Other affiliations ==
In the United States, Beres has worked on matters of nuclear terrorism with Department of Defense agencies as the Defense Nuclear Agency and the JFK Special Warfare Center; with Arms Control and Disarmament Agency; Defense Advanced Research Projects Agency; and with Nuclear Control Institute."

He was a contributing expert to the Ariel Center for Policy Research and is a regular contributor to Israel Defense (Tel Aviv).

== Popular writings ==
Beres' columns have appeared in such newspapers as The New York Times, Washington Times, Indianapolis Star, Chicago Tribune, Los Angeles Times, USA Today, Boston Globe, Washington Post, Christian Science Monitor, The Jerusalem Post (Israel), Arutz Sheva (Israel), Haaretz (Israel) and Neue Zürcher Zeitung (Switzerland). He also writes for U.S. News & World Report, The National Interest, Harvard National Security Journal (Harvard Law School), Yale Global Online (Yale University), and The Atlantic.

Beres was featured in a widely-reprinted debate with Shlomo Gazit (former Chief of IDF Intelligence Branch) on the "Middle East Peace Process." This debate appeared originally in Midstream magazine. The lead article in the prior month's Midstream was an article by Professor Beres titled: "The Argument for Israeli Nuclear Weapons."

== Publications ==
- Surviving amid Chaos: Israel's Nuclear Strategy (Rowman & Littlefield, 2016)
- Force, Order and Justice: International Law in the Age of Atrocity (Transnational Pub., 1997)
- Terrorism and Global Security: The Nuclear Threat (Boulder, Colorado: Westview Press, 1979), 161 pp. (2nd ed., 1987).
- America Outside the World: The Collapse of U.S. Foreign Policy (Lexington, Mass. 1987, Lexington Books), 172 p.
- Security or Armageddon: Israel's Nuclear Strategy (Lexington, Mass. 1986, Lexington Books), 242 pp.
- Reason and Realpolitik: U.S. Foreign Policy and World Order (Lexington, Mass. 1984, Lexington Books), 143 pp.
- Mimicking Sisyphus: America’s Countervailing Nuclear Strategy (Lexington, Mass. 1983, Lexington Books), 142 pp.
- Myths and Realities: US Nuclear Strategy (Muscatine, Iowa 1982, Stanley Foundation), 23 pp.
- Nuclear Strategy and World Order: The United States Imperative ([New York] 1982, World Order Models Project), 52 pp.
- People, States, and World Order (Itasca, Ill. 1981, F.E. Peacock Publishers), 237 pp.
- Apocalypse: Nuclear Catastrophe in World Politics (Chicago and London 1980, The University of Chicago Press), 315 pp. (2nd ed., 1982).
- Planning Alternative World Futures: Values, Methods, and Models edited by Louis René Beres, Harry R. Targ. (New York 1975, Praeger) 312 pp. (2nd ed., 1977).
- Transforming World Politics: The National Roots of World Peace (Denver 1975, University of Denver), 51 pp.
- The Management of World Power: A Theoretical Analysis (Denver 1973, University of Denver), 93 pp.
- Like Two Scorpions in a Bottle: Could Israel and Nuclear Iran coexist in the Middle East . Israel Journal of Foreign Affairs, VIII:1, 23-32
