= Policy of deliberate ambiguity =

Type of foreign policy

In the context of global politics, a policy of deliberate ambiguity (also known as a policy of strategic ambiguity or strategic uncertainty) is the practice by a government or non-state actor of being deliberately ambiguous with regard to all or certain aspects of its operational or positional policies. This is typically a way to avoid direct conflict while maintaining a masked, more assertive, or threatening position on a subject (broadly, a geopolitical risk aversion strategy).

== Examples of geopolitical ambiguity ==
=== China ===
Currently, two governments claim legitimate rule and sovereignty over all of China, which they claim includes mainland China, Hong Kong, Macau and Taiwan, as well as some other islands. The People's Republic of China (PRC) rules mainland China under a one-party system and Hong Kong and Macau as special administrative regions, while the Republic of China (ROC) governs the Island of Taiwan as well as the Kinmen Islands, the Pescadores Islands and the Matsu Islands, which the ROC collectively refers to as the "Free area of the Republic of China". For further background, see Two Chinas, One-China policy and Cross-Strait relations.

Owing to the controversial political status of Taiwan and the People's Republic of China's One-China principle, foreign governments have felt a need to be ambiguous regarding Taiwan. The PRC pressures states to recognize it as the sole legitimate representative of China, with which most states comply. In practice, however, most states maintain different levels of ambiguity on their attitudes to the Taiwan issue: see Foreign relations of the People's Republic of China and Foreign relations of the Republic of China.

Starting with the 1979 Nagoya Resolution and the following 1981 agreement with the International Olympic Committee, those from Taiwan who attend the Olympic Games and other various international organizations and events participate under the deliberately ambiguous name of "Chinese Taipei".

=== India ===
India's Draft Nuclear Doctrine of 2003 affirms its policies of "No First Use" and "Credible Minimum Deterrence", limiting its nuclear weapons posture. In spite of that, senior officials have implied that the country may have expanded their posture to include first-strike capabilities. It is not clear whether this is an instance of deliberate ambiguity.

=== Israel ===
Israel is deliberately ambiguous as to whether or not it possesses nuclear weapons, which its commentators term "nuclear ambiguity" or "nuclear opacity". It is a general consensus that Israel is in possession of nuclear weapons.

Israel has also practiced deliberate ambiguity over the issue of targeted killings and airstrikes. Prior to 2017, Israel generally neither confirmed nor denied whether Israel was involved in the deaths of suspected terrorists on foreign soil.

However, with the onset of the Syrian Civil War (and Israel's involvement against Iran and Hezbollah), exceptions to its policy became more prominent. Israel actively acknowledged that its intervention in the war has been limited to missile strikes, which until 2017 were not officially acknowledged. Israel has also made rare exceptions to this policy to deny involvement in certain killings in the war.

With regard to notable targeted killings and assassination attempts, Israel has often exhibited a more nuanced approach to policies of intentional ambiguity, as demonstrated by numerous assassination attempts on Mohammed Deif. (Note: Deif was killed in 2024.) This example of 'policy opacity' demonstrates how the approach to a subject can change with time and circumstance.

=== Russia ===
In early April 2015, an editorial in the British newspaper The Times, with a reference to semi-official sources within the Russian military and intelligence establishment, opined that Russia's warnings of its alleged preparedness for a nuclear response to certain non-nuclear acts on the part of NATO, were to be construed as "an attempt to create strategic uncertainty" to undermine Western concerted security policy.

=== United Kingdom ===
The United Kingdom is deliberately ambiguous about whether its ballistic missile submarines would carry out a nuclear counter-attack in the event that the government were destroyed by a nuclear first strike. Upon taking office, the incoming prime minister issues sealed letters of last resort to the commanders of the submarines on what action to take in such circumstances.

=== United States ===
==== Political status of Taiwan ====
The United States has numerous ambiguous policies relating to its positions on Taiwan. This issue is at the cornerstone of United States–Taiwan relations and a central sticking point in United States–China relations. This policy was intended to discourage both a unilateral declaration of independence by ROC leaders and an invasion of Taiwan by the PRC. The United States seemingly abandoned strategic ambiguity in 2001 after then-President George W. Bush stated that he would "do whatever it takes" to defend Taiwan. He later used more ambiguous language, stating in 2003 that "The United States policy is one China".

Former President Joe Biden also seemingly abandoned strategic ambiguity, having said on several occasions that the United States would defend Taiwan if it was attacked. After each of these remarks, however, the White House declared that there had been no official change in policy. As an example, in October 2021, President Biden announced a commitment that the United States would defend Taiwan if attacked by the People's Republic of China. But then the White House quickly clarified: "The president was not announcing any change in our policy and there is no change in our policy". In May 2022, Biden again stated that the US would intervene militarily if China invaded Taiwan, though a White House official again stated that the statement did not indicate a policy shift.

Since President Donald Trump's return to office in January 2025, the US policy on Taiwan has embraced the long-term policy of strategic ambiguity. In December 2025, the US published its Security Strategy and states that US will also maintain longstanding declaratory policy on Taiwan, meaning that the US does not support any unilateral change to the status quo in the Taiwan Strait.

During US President Donald Trump's May 2026 visit to China, Trump revealed that General Secretary of the Chinese Communist Party Xi Jinping had explicitly asked him whether he would defend Taiwan in the event of a conflict. Trump told the media that he had told Xi that "I do not talk about that", suggesting a continuation of the long-standing US policy of strategic ambiguity.

==== Senkaku Islands dispute ====
At the time of the reversion of Okinawa (including the Senkaku Islands) to Japan in 1972, the US government adopted an ambiguous policy on the status of the Senkaku Islands, which are claimed by China. It returned administration over the Senkaku Islands to Japan but has not taken a stance on the sovereignty of the islands. However, the islands are covered under Article 5 of the US-Japan Security Treaty.

==== Response to chemical or biological warfare ====
Another historic use of this policy is whether the United States would retaliate to a chemical or biological attack with nuclear weapons; specifically, during the Persian Gulf War. Related is the notion of a nuclear umbrella. Some commentators believe President Barack Obama broke US policy and damaged U.S. interests by failing to take sufficient action against the regime of Bashar al-Assad for its Ghouta chemical attack on civilians in the village of Ghouta near Damascus on August 21, 2013. President Barack Obama had used the phrase "red line" in reference to the use of chemical weapons on August 20, just one day prior. Specifically, Obama said: "We have been very clear to the Assad regime, but also to other players on the ground, that a red line for us is we start seeing a whole bunch of chemical weapons moving around or being utilized. That would change my calculus. That would change my equation."

==== Nuclear weapons on surface ships ====
Official U.S. Navy policy is "not to deploy nuclear weapons aboard surface ships, naval aircraft, attack submarines, or guided missile submarines. However, we do not discuss the presence or absence of nuclear weapons aboard specific ships, submarines, or aircraft.” Because the U.S. Navy refuses to confirm whether any particular ship is or is not carrying nuclear weapons, this was an effective ban on the ships' entry into New Zealand territory. In response, the United States partially suspended New Zealand from the ANZUS military alliance. President Ronald Reagan stated that New Zealand was "a friend, but not an ally".

==== Nuclear weapons and Israel ====
The United States also tolerates Israel's deliberate ambiguity as to whether Israel has nuclear weapons. Israel is not a signatory to the Treaty on the Non-Proliferation of Nuclear Weapons. Therefore, by not acknowledging that Israel likely has nuclear weapons, the US avoids having to sanction it for violating American anti-proliferation law.

=== Historical examples ===
==== Antarctic Treaty ====
Deliberate ambiguity was required to establish the Antarctic Treaty System, which bans military activity in Antarctica. By the 1950s, seven countries had made territorial claims in Antarctica, three of which were overlapping: Argentina, Chile, and the United Kingdom. Political pressure within these countries prevented them from renouncing their claims. In order to reach an agreement, the Antarctic Treaty was written ambiguously to neither affirm nor deny the legal status of previous claims. This circumvented the issue and allowed successful establishment of the treaty system.

==== East and West Germany ====
After West Germany gave up its "Hallstein Doctrine" of ending diplomatic relations with any country recognizing East Germany (thus implicitly following a "one-Germany policy"), West Germany turned to a policy of virtually or de facto recognizing East Germany in the 1970s, despite still maintaining several policies in accordance with the fictive but de jure legal principle of there being only one Germany.

East German citizens were treated as West German citizens upon arrival in West Germany and exports to East Germany were treated as if they were domestic trade. That created a deliberately ambiguous policy that reconciled the demand by the rest of the world for West Germany to acknowledge the existence of East Germany and the desire by the vast majority of West German politicians to avoid recognizing German partition as permanent.

== See also ==
- Country neutrality
- Double agent
- Dual loyalty
- Non-Aligned Movement
- Flexible response
- Glomar response
- Plausible deniability
