= Tammuz =

Tammuz may refer to:

- Dumuzid, Babylonian and Sumerian god
- Tammuz (crater), a crater of Ganymede, the largest moon of Jupiter
- Tammuz (Hebrew month), the 4th month of the Hebrew calendar
- Tammuz (Babylonian calendar), a month in the Babylonian calendar
- Tammuz 1 or Osirak, formerly a nuclear reactor in Iraq as part of Operation Opera

== See also ==
- Tamuz (disambiguation)
