= Iraq–Israel relations =

- Iraq: Israel

Iraq–Israel relations refer to the bilateral ties between the State of Israel and the Republic of Iraq. Due to Iraq's non-recognition of Israel as a legitimate state since the latter's establishment in 1948, the two countries have not had any formal diplomatic relations. The Hashemite Kingdom of Iraq was a part of the Arab coalition that declared war on and invaded Israel shortly after its establishment, sparking the 1948 Arab–Israeli War, and the two states have since then been in a continuous state of hostilities. Iraqi forces also participated in the Six-Day War and the Yom Kippur War in 1967 and 1973, respectively.

In 1981, Israel carried out Operation Opera in Ba'athist Iraq, in which the Israeli Air Force bombed and successfully destroyed an Iraqi nuclear reactor that was under construction at the Tuwaitha Nuclear Research Centre near Baghdad; the reactor had been attacked and partially damaged by Iran during its Operation Scorch Sword, which had been carried out a year prior to the Israeli strike amidst the Iran–Iraq War. During the 1990–1991 Gulf War, Iraq carried out a missile campaign against Israel, in which it launched 42 modified Scud missiles (designated Al-Hussein) at Israeli cities with the strategic objective of provoking Israel into launching retaliatory attacks and potentially jeopardizing the multinational coalition formed by the United States against Iraq, which had full backing and extensive contributions from other Muslim-majority states; Israel did not respond to the Iraqi missile attacks due to American pressure, and Iraq failed to gather support for its occupation of Kuwait.

The post-2003 Republic of Iraq continues to be a strong supporter of the Arab League boycott of Israel. All Iraqi passports are invalid for travel to Israel and Israeli passports are likewise invalid for entry into Iraq. Alongside a number of other Arab and Muslim-majority countries, Iraq is designated as a hostile state under Israeli law, and Israeli citizens may not visit the country without a special permit issued by the Israeli Interior Ministry.

== History ==
=== Until the 2003 Iraq War ===
The British in the 1930s built the Mosul–Haifa oil pipeline from Western Iraq through the British-ruled Emirate of Transjordan then to Haifa, in Mandatory Palestine. During the Anglo-Iraqi War, the Irgun - an Israeli independence movement - participated in the British invasion of Iraq. Immediately after the declaration of the establishment of the State of Israel in May 1948, Arab armies, including those of Iraq, invaded the former Mandate Palestine territory, and the oil pipeline to Haifa was shut down, and the pipeline diverted through a branch line to Tripoli in Syria. Following the war, Iraq was the only Arab country not to sign a ceasefire agreement with Israel, and the two countries have technically been in a continuous state of war since 1948.

Despite not sharing a border with Israel, Iraq was an important player in the Arab–Israeli conflict. Iraqi troops in Jordan became involved in the Six-Day War in 1967, suffering 10 dead. The war ended before the Iraqis had time to undertake any serious offensive action. Iraq played a more important role in the Yom Kippur War, when it sent 30,000 men, 250–500 tanks, and 700 APCs to the Syrian front just as the Syrians were on the verge of collapse. Combined Syrian, Iraqi and Jordanian counterattacks prevented the Israelis from advancing further into Syria, but failed to push the Israelis back. The war ended in an Arab defeat, with Israeli forces standing 40 km from Damascus.

Under Saddam Hussein's rule, Israel regarded Iraq as a major security threat. In 1981, Israel carried out Operation Opera, bombing Iraq's Osirak nuclear reactor to halt the development of nuclear weapons. Iraq, busy with the Iran–Iraq War, did not respond. Throughout the war, Israel provided clandestine support to Iran, viewing Iraq as a more serious threat than Iran.

During the Gulf War in 1991, without provocation, Iraq fired 42 Scud missiles at Israel, aiming to drag Israel into the war and thus imperil the US-led coalition, in which several Arab countries participated. Upon urging by the United States of Israel to stay out of the war, Israel did not retaliate.

According to British author Nigel Ashton, in 1995, Israeli Prime Minister Yitzhak Rabin sent a message to Hussein through King Hussein of Jordan requesting a meeting between him and Hussein. Rabin hoped peace with Iraq might encourage Iran and Syria to do the same. Rabin was assassinated in November, ending the contact between the two governments. Rabin had previously supervised Operation Bramble Bush, a failed 1992 plan to assassinate Hussein with Sayeret Matkal commandos.

Saddam Hussein was widely revered in Arab world for his pro-Palestinian stance and he supported several Palestinian guerrilla and militant organisations. During the second Palestinian intifada, Iraq gave monetary support to the families of Palestinian martyrs, including suicide bombers.

=== After the US invasion of Iraq ===
In 2003, a US-UK led coalition of nations toppled Hussein's government in an effort called Operation Iraqi Freedom. Although Israel was not included in the coalition, there were indications of its support. According to John Kerry, Netanyahu (as a private citizen) was "profoundly forward-leaning and outspoken about the importance of invading Iraq". It was reported in The Washington Post that Israel was "urging United States officials not to delay a military strike against Iraq's Saddam Hussein". It was also reported that Israeli intelligence provided Washington with alarming reports about Iraq's alleged program to develop weapons of mass destruction.

On the contrary, some have argued that Israel did not have much role in pushing for the war. According to former US Undersecretary of Defense Douglas Feith, Israeli officials did not push their US counterparts to initiate the war in Iraq. In an interview with Ynet, Feith stated that "what you heard from the Israelis was not any kind of advocacy of war with Iraq" and that "[w]hat you heard from Israeli officials in private discussions was that they were not really focused on Iraq... [t]hey were much more focused on Iran."

Former Iraqi Prime Minister Ayad Allawi said in 2004 that Iraq would not reconcile its differences with Israel.

On 1 July 2008, Israeli Defense Minister Ehud Barak shook hands and met briefly with Iraqi President Jalal Talabani at a conference of Socialist International in Greece. Barak and Talabani were both at the conference as representatives of their respective political parties, Labour and Patriotic Union of Kurdistan.

Iraqi MP Mithal al-Alusi has twice visited Israel; once in 2004 and again in 2008, drawing protest from many in the Iraqi government. He has called for diplomatic relations and military intelligence sharing between Iraq and Israel.

During the Gaza War (2008–09), the Iraqi government condemned Israel for the attack, stating that: "the Iraqi government demands a halt to the military operations, that civilians’ lives are not unnecessarily exposed to danger and requests that the international community honour its responsibilities and take the required measures to stop the attack". The Dawa Party of Prime Minister Nouri al-Maliki called on Islamic countries to cut relations with Israel and end all "secret and public talks" with it. In addition, the Iraqi Shia leader Ali al-Sistani has called for decisive action by Arab and Muslim states for an end to Israeli attacks on Gaza. After the 2010 Gaza flotilla raid, an Iraqi government official, MP Khairallah al-Basri (a member of former premier Nouri al-Maliki's Islamist State of Law Coalition), condemned the attack and described it as a "new humanitarian disaster," as well as, "a violation of human rights and a breach of international standards and norms." In July 2012 Iraqi Prime Minister Nouri al-Maliki said that Iraq will establish diplomatic relations with all countries except Israel.

Some Iraqi officials and Kurdish leaders have accused the Iraqi government of secretly smuggling oil to Israel. Kurdish MP Farhad al-Atroushi accused the Iraqi government of smuggling oil to Israel via Jordan. The allegation was denied by Iraq's Deputy Prime Minister Hussain al-Shahristani and Jordan's Information and Communication Minister Rakan al-Majali. Iraqi Prime Minister Nouri al-Maliki denied the allegation as well and in turn accused Iraqi Kurdistan of smuggling oil to Israel.

Before the 2017 Iraqi Kurdistan independence referendum, Israel was the only major world power that supported the independence of Iraqi Kurdistan. In the subsequent Iraqi offensive to retake territories in Iraq which had been held by the Peshmerga since ISIL's Northern Iraq offensive in 2014 (known as the Kirkuk Crisis), the Iraqi army quickly overran territories captured by the Kurdish Peshmerga outside the borders of Iraqi Kurdistan during the war on ISIL, including the city of Kirkuk. During the brief war, Israeli Prime Minister Benjamin Netanyahu lobbied world powers to prevent further setbacks for Iraqi Kurds.

On 26 May 2022, the Iraqi Council of Representatives passed a bill put forward by Muqtada al-Sadr prohibiting the normalization of relations with Israel, as well as "financial or moral assistance" to the country. Any violators of the law will be given either the death penalty or life imprisonment. Out of the 329 seats, 275 voted in favour of the bill, which will also be enforced on foreign companies in Iraq, members of the Iraqi diaspora, organizations, and foreigners visiting Iraq. The United States Department of State accused Iraq of "jeopardizing freedom of expression and promoting an environment of antisemitism" in response. British Foreign officials also expressed concerns about the law's implications.

=== Jewish Heritage and Israeli Outreach ===
In May 2018, Israel’s Ministry of Foreign Affairs launched a Facebook page called “Israel in the Iraqi Dialect” to reach Iraqi audiences. The page shared content about Israelis of Iraqi Jewish descent and Israeli society. Israeli officials described it as a “digital embassy” intended to encourage dialogue with Iraqis, although the two countries had no formal diplomatic relations. At the 2018 Baghdad International Book Fair, Arabic translations of The Conflict of Identities in Iraq, written by Israeli researchers, and The Pictures on the Wall, a novel by Israeli-Iraqi author Tsionit Fattal-Kuperwasser, were displayed. Both works were mentioned in an article about the Israeli Foreign Ministry’s Iraqi-dialect Facebook page, which also discussed the page’s efforts to reach Iraqi audiences. In October 2026, a museum devoted to the history of Iraq’s Jewish community opened in the former Shamash Jewish School building on al-Rashid Street in Baghdad. Its exhibits included clothing, religious books and ritual objects. The Israeli Foreign Ministry’s “Israel in the Iraqi Dialect” Facebook page also reported the opening, according to an Arabic-language news outlet.

=== Islamic Resistance in Iraq attacks on Israel ===
In November 2023, the Islamic Resistance in Iraq began military operations against Israel, targeting Eilat, the Dead Sea coastline, the Israeli-occupied Golan Heights, the Karish gas field, Haifa, Ashdod, Kiryat Shmona, Tel Aviv and in Elifelet with drones and missiles. Many of the drones and missiles have been intercepted by the Israeli Air Force and Royal Jordanian Air Force. In October 2024, reports indicated that Iran-linked militias in Iraq had intensified their activities with drone and rocket attacks on Israel.

=== 2024 military threat from Israel ===
In November 2024, Israeli news outlets began reporting that Israel may target the Islamic Resistance in Iraq for its campaign against Israel during its wars on Gaza and on Lebanon. Unnamed officials allegedly told outlets that satellites monitored the transfer of ballistic missiles and related equipment from Iran to Iraqi territory.

On 19 November, Israel issued a letter to the UN Security Council asserting its right to self-defense against the Islamic Resistance in Iraq for its military campaign on Israel during its wars on Gaza and Lebanon. Iraqi Prime Minister Mohammed Shia al-Sudani warned that the letter served as pretext for an attack on Iraq, aligning with Israel's efforts to expand the war in the region.

The Israeli security threat towards Iraq caused the Iraqi government to issue a statement that it would take all necessary diplomatic and military actions to protect its sovereignty. On 21 November, The Iraqi government requested an emergency session of the Arab League Council through the Iraqi Permanent Mission to the Arab League to address the Israeli threats against Iraq. The request highlighted Israel's threats in its letter to the UN Security Council, where it sought to expand its aggression in the region to Iraq.

=== 2024–2026 Israeli military presence in Iraq ===
In 2026, it was revealed by The Wall Street Journal and The New York Times that Israel had maintained a clandestine military presence in Iraq consisting of two makeshift bases. The bases were constructed as early as late 2024 and were used to support Israeli attacks on Iran during the 2025 Twelve-Day War and 2026 Iran war. Israel prevented the discovery of its secret bases by killing Iraqi soldiers and civilians approaching the area.

== See also ==
- Iraq–Palestine relations
- Iraqi Jews in Israel
- Arab–Israeli conflict
- Israeli–Kurdistan Region relations
- International recognition of Israel
