= Package Q Strike =

American airstrike in the Persian Gulf War

Coordinates: 33°18′56″N 44°23′31″E

Package Q Airstrike
- Part of the Gulf War
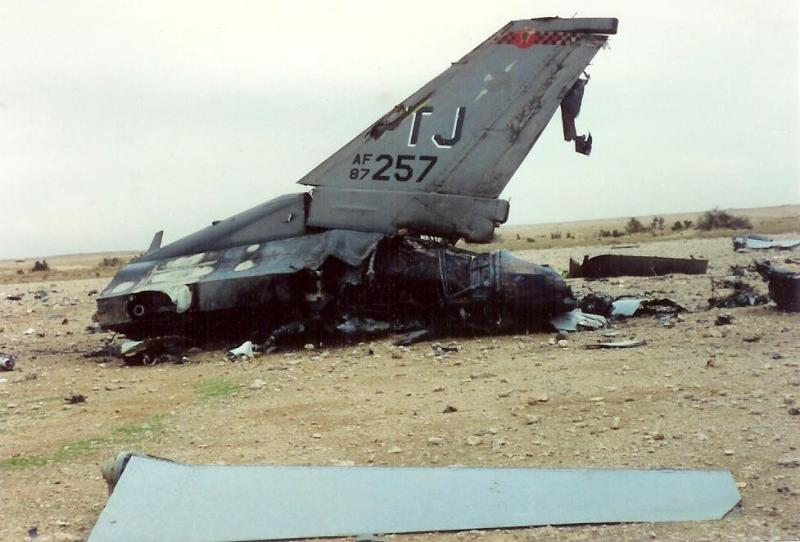
- Remains of F-16C 87-0257 as found by U.S. Marines in Iraq during Desert Storm. The canopy was recovered by U.S. forces in the 2003 invasion.
Date	19 January 1991
Location	Baghdad, Iraq
Result	Iraqi victory U.S. tactics revised

Belligerents
United States	Iraq

Commanders and leaders
(United States) Norman Schwarzkopf (United States) Buster Glosson	(Ba'athist Iraq) Saddam Hussein (Ba'athist Iraq) Muzahim Saab Hassan

Units involved
Ninth Air Force	Iraqi Air Force

Strength
56 F-16s; 6 F-4s; 14 F-15Cs; 2 EF-111s; Total: 78 aircraft	Thousands of SAMs & AAA guns 25 MiG-23s; 20 MiG-25s; 10 MiG-29s; Total: 55 aircraft

Casualties and losses
2 pilots captured 2 F-16s shot down	Hundreds of military & civilian casualties Serious damage done to air defenses Critical oil refinery damage

The Package Q Airstrike was the largest airstrike of the Gulf War and the largest strike of F-16 Fighting Falcon fighter aircraft in history. Many aircraft, including the F-117 Nighthawk, were used to attack targets in Baghdad, which was the most heavily defended area of Iraq. The same target was hit several times by F-117s, and the last package consisted of seventeen F-111F Aardvarks on the 19th day of the war.

The main target of the strike was the Tuwaitha Nuclear Research Center near Baghdad, which was the site of the Osirak Nuclear Reactor that was attacked by the Iranian Air Force in 1980 and again by the Israeli Air Force in 1981, along with many other military sites across the city. Two aircraft were shot down, with two pilots becoming POWs. The mission goal was not met, with the reactors of the research facility only slightly damaged, although many of the secondary targets were hit. F-117 aircraft re-attacked the facility later, causing significant damage.

The attack was the largest of the war and represented an attempt to strike Iraqi defenses a serious blow. The raid illustrated how a number of small incidents or stresses, none by themselves necessarily serious, could contribute to an unsatisfactory outcome, which eventually convinced United States Air Force (USAF) commanders to call off further airstrikes against downtown Baghdad by conventional (non-stealth) aircraft.

== Prelude ==
The air campaign against Iraq was going very well for the Coalition. Thousands of sorties had been flown around the clock across targets in Kuwait and Iraq. The Iraqi Air Force had proven to be very reluctant to attack the overwhelming Coalition air power. Seventy-two USAF F-16s from the 388th Tactical Fighter Wing and 401st Tactical Fighter Wing, along with some F-4G Wild Weasel Vs from the 561st Fighter Squadron and F-15C Eagles from the 53rd Fighter Squadron, were organized into the largest strike of the war, and the largest F-16 strike in history.

The organization was confused, with many air commanders not receiving their orders until the night of 18 January. Overnight three more main targets, in downtown Baghdad, were added. This meant that once the attack force had hit the reactor, which was in the southeast corner of Baghdad, it would have to proceed to the downtown area, which necessitated flying through hundreds of alerted surface-to-air missiles (SAM) and AAA, making them easy pickings. There was no time to change the mission plans, and the attack went ahead anyway.

== Strength ==
Because of the distance between the airfields and Baghdad, the F-4s were lightly loaded, each only carrying two AGM-88 HARM anti-radiation missiles because of their high fuel consumption rate. This limited the number of targets the SEAD aircraft could attack. The F-16s were very heavily loaded, each carrying Mark-84 bombs, two external fuel tanks, two air-to-air missiles to protect them from Iraqi aircraft, and 90 bundles of chaff, with fifteen flares.

The Iraqi forces had several air bases within striking distance of Baghdad that could be ready in minutes, all housing MiG-29 fighter aircraft. The Iraqi forces also had thousands of AAA and SAM sites throughout Baghdad, ranging from World War II-era flak guns to surface-to-air and air-to-air missiles on state-of-the-art interceptors and fighters. Overall, the Iraqis had the resources to inflict many casualties on the strike force.

== Strike ==
On the afternoon of 19 January, all the aircraft took off from Saudi Arabia and Qatar. From there, they all met with tanker aircraft in Saudi Arabia, near the border with Iraq. Link-up and refueling with the tankers ran into problems. There was bad weather along the tanker tracks, and the tankers approached the release point too early. Consequently, they throttled back to minimum speed, which seriously affected the accompanying fighters. The F-16s were soon close to stalling out, and some had to light afterburners just to stay airborne. Four fighters coming off the last tanker fell so far behind that their mission commander ordered them to return to base.

After the refueling, all the aircraft turned towards Baghdad, and headed out in force. They had to dodge AAA and SAMs sporadically en route, though as the package reached Baghdad airspace, it broke out into the open. Iraqi gunners responded to the Americans with a couple of high-altitude shots from 100mm antiaircraft guns in the middle of several formations, adding to the confusion and disarray of the flak below them. Confusion mounted and coordination became harder, with the mission groups in the strike package experiencing difficulties communicating. The mission commander of the flight attacking downtown Baghdad estimated that he received approximately 80 percent of the calls from all aircraft in the strike, an impossible workload for a single pilot with his own aircraft to fly.

From the moment the package approached Baghdad's air defenses, the Wild Weasels engaged enemy SAM sites. There was a problem with the Weasels allocated to the mission. Either because of fuel, timing, or the decision of the package commander, not all made it to Baghdad. Some Weasels did not fire all their HARMs, suggesting that they had run low on fuel, or were ordered out before they were able to successfully use all their missiles.

The "downtown" aircraft, F-16s with newer model engines chosen for their greater performance, and their escorts, passed other F-16s on the way to, rolling in on, and leaving targets, all in a hostile environment. While these aircraft were still making their way to downtown, the F-4 "Wild Weasels" ran low on fuel and departed. This left the F-16s and F-15Cs alone against the capital city's air defenses. Maj. John Nichols heard the Weasels call that they were leaving as he rolled in to strike his target, the Iraqi Air Force Headquarters. Cloud cover obscured the target. Nichols rolled off to turn to an alternate target, an oil refinery which was under attack by a portion of his formation.

Up to this point, the Iraqis had fired most of their SAMs ballistically, meaning they were not under guidance when launched. Within a short time of the Weasel call that they were leaving, SAMs directly engaged Nichols' flight. Many SAMs were now guided on direct trajectories toward the aircraft. Most of his flight had to take evasive action, which included "last-ditch maneuvers" such as jettisoning fuel tanks and bombs. Approximately half of the flight struck the oil refinery. Others were en route to alternate targets, when SAMs engaged and forced them to jettison ordnance.

SAMs hit one F-16 just as the last bombs were striking the oil refinery. A second missile impacted near another F-16, damaging it, as the flight evaded SAMs during their egress from Baghdad. Both aircraft were lost, but their pilots survived the war as POWs. One of the two lost aircraft took a hit from an SA-3 missile just south of Baghdad, but managed to fly for 150 miles on the return route before the engine failed. In all, the participants in the engagement counted twenty SAMs in the air. One pilot dodged no fewer than six. Many of the F-16 aircraft sustained major or minor damage, but stayed airworthy.

From the VTR tape of that day:

"Okay, SAM launch! Nose 5 low!"
(Air controller interruptions)
"Break right! Break right!"
"Okay, missed him."
(impact)
"Stroke One's a hit! Stroke One's a hit!"
"Stroke One took a hit! Stroke One took a hit!" "Status?"
"Okay, I've got a fire! I'm ah-stand by. Um, just south of steerpoint number seven. Still flyin'. And I'm headin' south."
"Copy."
"Okay, it ... we took a pretty good hit. I've got no engine."

As the survivors of the strike left Baghdad, eight Iraqi MiG-29s started closing toward the rear of the F-16s. Their F-15C top cover had apparently left earlier, after the F-4s. When undamaged F-16s turned to attack the MiGs, the Iraqis fled. As a consequence of all the defensive maneuvering, by the time that the F-16s approached the border, some were almost out of fuel. One fighter would have crashed short of Coalition territory had a KC-135 tanker from the Kansas Air National Guard not crossed over into enemy territory. When the F-16 began refueling in Iraqi territory, the fighter had only 800 pounds of fuel on board. In the words of the wing commander, who was flying as a wingman, it was "an eye-watering situation."

== Result ==
The loss of two F-16s can be attributed to a series of stresses, the lateness of the Air Tasking Order, not enough coordination time, a tactical approach that provided the Iraqis considerable warning, fuel problems for the Weasels and other aircraft, bad weather, and insufficient attrition of the defenses combined to create a dangerous situation.

There were a number of crucial lessons from Package Q. The most obvious was that Iraqi defenses in Baghdad remained lethal: future strikes on Baghdad were mostly assigned to F-117s, but conventional air assets with better coordination still struck targets in downtown Baghdad.

There was a crucial operational turn that the mission's failure caused. General Glosson and his planners had hoped that destruction or at least degradation of Baghdad's air defenses would have allowed them to send large groups packages of F-16s into the capital during the daytime. Their targets, as on the morning of day three, would have been the larger command headquarters and symbols of the regime, such as those of the Ba'ath Party, Republican Guard, and Directorate of General Military Intelligence. These structures were so big that unguided bombs dropped by F-16s, even though less accurate, could hit them with a fair probability of success. As symbols of the regime, the destruction of such headquarters was hoped to have had major political and military effects.

The difficulties that Package Q encountered, and the potential for inadvertent bomb release by aircraft under SAM attack, caused General Horner and his planners to decide against sending an F-16 group against downtown Baghdad on the next day. "Actually, we called the HQ and told them that sending us again with the paltry support they supported us with on the first mission "again" was a poor decision (Maj. Gen. John Nichols). They realized that their plan was flawed on the 19th, in spite of our advice on the evening of the 18th, when they drastically changed the plan and mis-allocated forces and order of the attack on the targets. We still flew the mission, even after advising them that their planning was drastically flawed in too many ways to describe."

As a result of Package Q, American air doctrine underwent changes. For example, F-16 packages remained smaller—and thus more manageable and easier to coordinate and fly—for the remainder of the war.
