= F107 =

F107 or F-107 may refer to:

- HMS Rothesay (F107), a 1957 British Royal Navy Rothesay-class frigate
- Netz 107, an Israeli Air Force F-16 on display at the Israeli Air Force Museum
- North American F-107, a 1956 American supersonic military fighter prototype
- Williams F107, a small turbofan jet engine
