= Netz 107 =

F-16 fighter of the Israeli Air Force

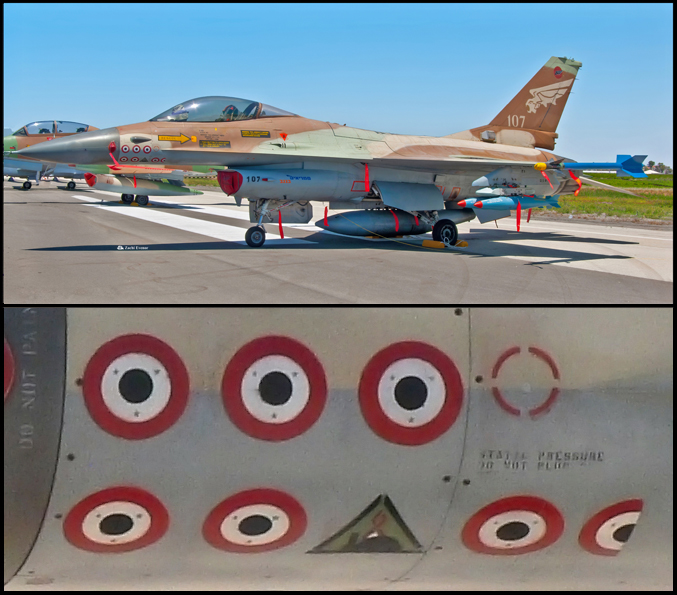
- Netz 107 on display during Israel Independence Day

General information
- Type: General Dynamics F-16A block 10 Fighting Falcon (Netz)
- Owners: Israeli Air Force / IDF/AF
- Serial: 107

History
- First flight: 1980
- In service: 2 July 1980
- Last flight: 2015
- Preserved at: Preserved on display at the Israeli Air Force Museum.

Netz 107 is a General Dynamics F-16A block 10 Fighting Falcon of the Israeli Air Force, tail number 107. Netz 107 participated in Operation Opera (the bombing the Osiraq nuclear reactor) and was later credited with 6.5 enemy aircraft kills, a world record number of kills for an F-16.

== Operational service ==
The first F-16A/B Netz fighters arrived in Israel during 1980 and were issued to 117 Squadron (Israel) of the Israeli Air Force. Netz 107 was the first F-16 to touch Israeli soil when it landed on 2 July 1980 at Ramat David Airbase.

On 7 June 1981 Netz 107 took part in Operation Opera, piloted by Amos Yadlin, and was the second F-16 to strike the Osiraq nuclear reactor after wing leader Ze'ev Raz.

Netz 107 scored its first aerial kill on 21 April 1982 when pilot Zeev Raz shot down a Syrian Air Force MiG-23. During Operation Peace for Galilee it shot down 6 more Syrian aircraft. On 9 June 1982, Eliezer Shkedi shot down two MiG-23s, although one was shared with another pilot. On Friday 11 June 1982 pilot Eytan Stibbe shot down four Syrian aircraft.

Several years later Netz 107 was re-allocated to 253 Squadron (Israel) along with other F-16A/Bs. In 2015 it was retired from service and put on display at the Israeli Air Force Museum.

=== Kills ===
Date	Pilot	Weapon	Target
7 June 1981	Amos Yadlin	Mark 84 Bomb	Iraqi Osirak nuclear reactor
21 April 1982	Ze'ev Raz	AIM-9 Sidewinder	Syrian MiG-23
9 June 1982	Eliezer Shkedi	AIM-9 Sidewinder	Syrian MiG-23 (shared kill)
9 June 1982	Eliezer Shkedi	AIM-9 Sidewinder	Syrian MiG-23
11 June 1982	Eytan Stibbe	AIM-9 Sidewinder	Syrian MiG-23
11 June 1982	Eytan Stibbe	AIM-9 Sidewinder	Syrian Sukhoi Su-22
11 June 1982	Eytan Stibbe	M61A1 Vulcan gun	Syrian Sukhoi Su-22
11 June 1982	Eytan Stibbe	missile	Syrian Aérospatiale Gazelle helicopter
