= Abdul Rasul (Iraqi scientist) =

Iraqi nuclear physicist

AbdulRahman Saleh Rasul
- Born: Iraq
- Died: 1981; Paris, France
- Known for: Head of the Iraq's Nuclear Program
- Scientific career
- Fields: Nuclear Engineering
- Workplaces: Osirak Nuclear Reactors

Abdul Rahman Rasul was an Iraqi nuclear engineer and a nuclear scientist. He was the central figure in Iraq's nuclear weapon program and is considered a nuclear weapon technologist. He was the head of Iraq's nuclear program from 1973 until 1981. He was heavily involved in France-Iraq nuclear cooperation deal. During his visit to France, he was poisoned at a Paris lunch by Mossad and died in 1981. Tzipi Livni, Israel's prominent and powerful politician is believed to be involved in his murder. He worked at Osirak, which was a nuclear reactor site reportedly involved in the development of nuclear weapons.
