= Tamuz =

Tamuz may refer to:

- Tammuz (Hebrew month), in the Jewish calendar
- Tammuz (Babylonian calendar), in the Arabic and Assyrian calendars
- Tammuz (Mandaean month), in the Mandaean calendar
- Tammuz (mythology), a supernatural creature from Assyrian-Babylonian Mesopotamian religion
- Tamouz (band), an Israeli rock band
- Tamuz (kibbutz), an Israeli kibbutz
- Spike (missile) M113 Tamuz, an Israeli item of military equipment
- Tamuz Prize, an Israeli award for Singer of the Year
- Al Tammuz, Iraqi long range scud missile

== See also ==
- Tammuz (disambiguation)
