= Relik Shafir =

Retired Israeli Brigadier General

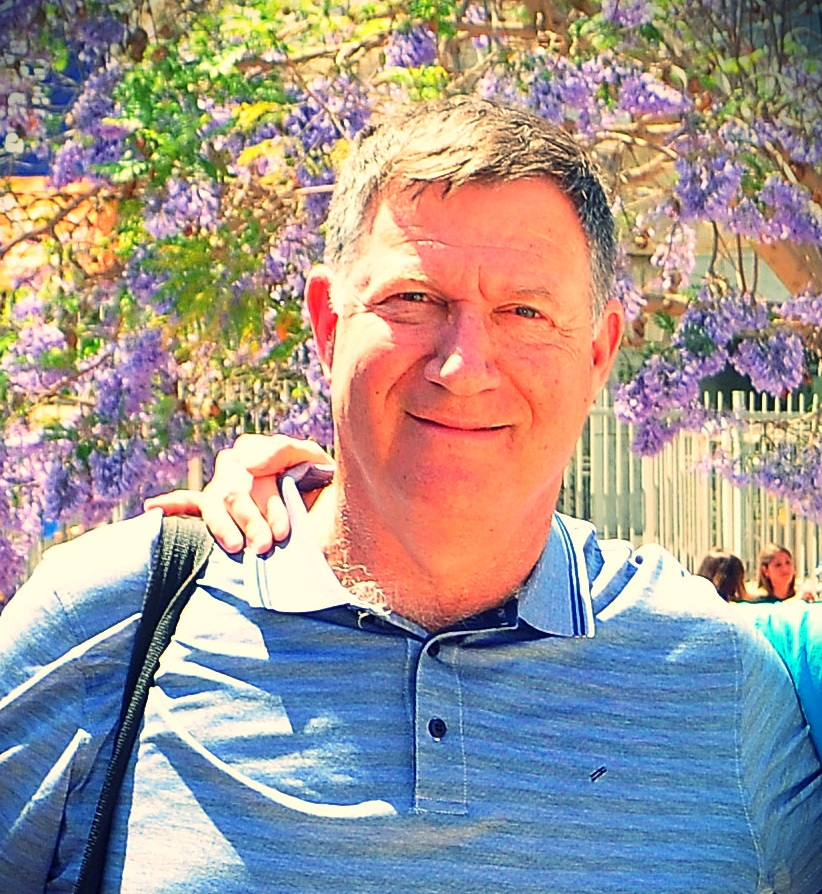
Portrait of Relik Shafir

Israel "Relik" Shafir (Hebrew: רליק שפיר; born 1953) is a retired Israeli Brigadier General (1971–2002), and one of eight air force pilots who took part in Operation Opera, the attack on Iraq's Osirak nuclear reactor. Shafir served as commander of Israel's Flight school at Hatzerim airbase, and as commander of Israel's large air force base, Tel Nof. Shafir is a Mig ""Äce" and is the only Israeli pilot credited with kills in both the F-15 and F-16. Shafir studied Mathematics and Philosophy at the Bar-Ilan University, and is a graduate of the Naval Postgraduate School in Monterey, California. Following his military service, and during emergency situations, Shafir served as a foreign press spokesperson for the Israeli Air Force.
