= Khidir Hamza =

Iraqi atomic scientist (born 1939)

- خضر حمزة
- Born: January 18, 1939; Kingdom of Iraq
- Died: * Ph.D. (Physics, 1969), Florida State University, Tallahassee: M.Sc. (Physics, 1965), Massachusetts Institute of Technology, Cambridge; B.Sc. (Physics, 1960), University of Baghdad, Iraq
- Known for: Iraqi Nuclear programme
- Scientific career
- Fields: Nuclear Physics
- Workplaces: Fort Valley State College, USA (1969-1970); Iraqi Atomic Energy Commission (1970-1990); University of Baghdad, Iraq; Al-Mustansiriya University, Iraq; 7th April University, Libya (1994-1995)
- Thesis: 'Coulomb Forces in the Three Body Problem' (1969)

Khidir Hamza (Arabic: خضر حمزة) is an Iraqi atomic scientist who worked for Saddam Hussein's nuclear program in the 1980s and early 1990s. Following the Gulf War, he left Iraq in 1994 and went into exile in the United States. He provided testimony to Western intelligence agencies suggesting that Hussein's weapons of mass destruction programs were active and ongoing. However, claims of active WMD programs including nuclear weapons have since been invalidated, and his self-described role as the former head of Iraq's nuclear weapons program has been discredited.

== Education ==
Hamza first came to the United States in the 1960s, attending the Massachusetts Institute of Technology after being recommended by Abdul Jabbar Abdullah, a prominent Iraqi scientist and an alumnus of MIT himself. He later attended Florida State University, obtaining a degree in nuclear physics. He intended to stay permanently in America, but following the 1968 coup, Khidir heard about how families of relatives living overseas were arrested and reportedly tortured. Fearing for his parents and threats from Mossad and the PLO for turning down an offer to develop nuclear bombs for the PLO (the person who approached him for the job was allegedly assassinated by the Mossad in 1978 in Paris), he applied for his return.

== Iraqi nuclear program ==
Upon his return to Iraq in 1970, he began work on nuclear research and nuclear weaponry. He has claimed that he had persuaded Saddam Hussein to start a nuclear weapons program, brought Iraq into the IAEA, was in charge of the purchase, construction, and operation of the Osirak reactor and the surrounding Baghdad Nuclear Research Facility (better known by its Iraqi name, Al Tuwaitha), by 1981, was in charge of Iraq's nuclear weapons program (succeeding Hussain al-Shahristani). During the Gulf War he claimed he was able to complete work on a stable bomb capable of being used on Israel, although it was too large to fit on a missile (he claimed it was 4 feet in diameter, about the size of Fat Man), and it never had the nuclear core.

== Post-war career ==
After the Gulf War, in response to Saddam Hussein's increasing restrictions on scientists, Hamza left Iraq and defected to the United States.

In 2000 he co-authored the book Saddam's Bombmaker: The Daring Escape of the Man Who Built Iraq's Secret Weapon with Jeff Stein (ISBN 0-684-87386-9).

In testimony before the Senate Foreign Relations Committee in 2002, Hamza stated that Iraq possessed more than ten tons of uranium, and one ton of slightly enriched uranium, which he claimed was enough to allow them to build three nuclear weapons by 2005. This testimony, and other statements by Hamza, were used by the United States government as part of their justification for the 2003 invasion of Iraq.

Hamza's credentials and testimony have been challenged by others who dispute his knowledge of Iraq's nuclear program. Imad Khadduri, a former scientist with the Iraqi Atomic Energy Commission, accused Hamza of exaggerating "to a great extent his own role in the nuclear weapon program." Hussein Kamel al-Majid, son-in-law of Saddam Hussein, who defected to Jordan in 1995, described Hamza as "a professional liar." David Albright, a former nuclear weapons inspector in Iraq and the director of the Institute for Science and International Security where Hamza worked between 1997 and 1999, stated "Hamza had some good information about Iraqi nuclear programs until his departure from Iraq, but that's it. But he went off the edge. He started saying irresponsible things."

In 2002, Scott Ritter, a long-time colleague of Albright heavily criticized the Bush administration and media outlets for using the testimony of Hamza as a rationale for invading Iraq:

We seized the entire records of the Iraqi nuclear program, especially the administrative records. We got a name of everybody, where they worked, what they did, and the top of the list, Saddam's 'Bombmaker' was a man named Jafar Dhia Jafar, not Khidir Hamza, and if you go down the list of the senior administrative personnel you will not find Hamza's name in there. In fact, we didn't find his name at all. Because in 1990, he didn't work for the Iraqi Nuclear Program. He had no knowledge of it because he worked as a kickback specialist for Hussein Kamel in the Presidential Palace.

He goes into northern Iraq and meets up with Ahmad Chalabi. He walks in and says, "I'm Saddam's 'Bombmaker'". So they call the CIA and they say, "we know who you are, you're not Saddam's 'Bombmaker', go sell your story to someone else." And he was released, he was rejected by all intelligence services at the time, he's a fraud.

And here we are, someone who the CIA knows is a fraud, the US Government knows is a fraud, is allowed to sit in front of the United States Senate Committee on Foreign Relations and give testimony as an expert witness. I got a problem with that, I got a problem with the American media, and I've told them over and over and over again that this man is a documentable fraud, a fake, and yet they allow him to go on CNN, MSNBC, CNBC, and testify as if he actually knows what he is talking about.
