= Operation Scorch Sword =

1980 Iranian surprise airstrike in Iraq

- Part of the Iran–Iraq War
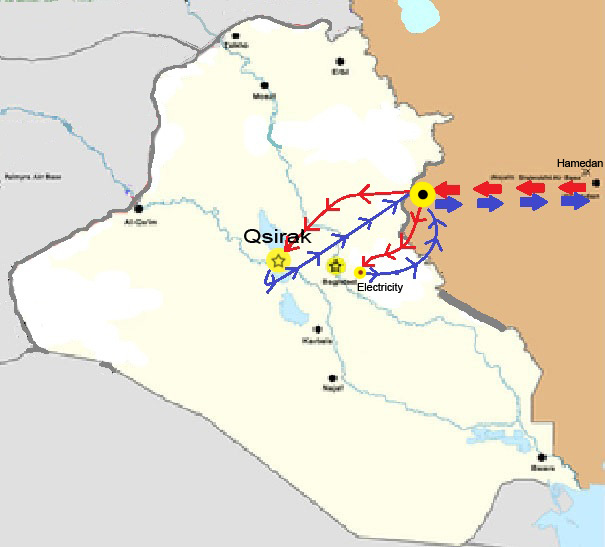
- Unofficial map displaying the general course of the Iranian F-4 Phantom IIs
- Operational scope: Strategic
- Location: Tuwaitha Nuclear Research Centre, Diyala Governorate, Iraq; 33.206°N 44.519°E
- Planned by: Maj. Gen. Javad Fakoori
- Objective: Destruction of Iraq's Osirak nuclear reactor
- Date: 30 September 1980
- Executed by: Islamic Republic of Iran Air Force
- Outcome: Tactical victory: Cessation of the Iraqi nuclear program for around three months; No long term damage to the nuclear reactor; Reactor suffers heavy damage in Operation Opera, done by Israel in secret assistance to Iran
- Location of the Osirak nuclear reactor within Iraq

Operation Scorch Sword (Persian: عَمَلیاتِ شمشیرِ سوزان) was an Iranian airstrike on Iraq's Tuwaitha Nuclear Research Centre in 1980. Conducted eight days after the beginning of the Iraqi invasion of Iran, it was a surprise attack against the under-construction Osirak nuclear reactor, which was located 17 kilometres (11 miles) to the southeast of Baghdad and was widely perceived as a major asset for the then-ongoing Iraqi nuclear program. At dawn on 30 September, four Iranian F-4 Phantom IIs completed an aerial refueling near the Iran–Iraq border before flying into Iraqi airspace, where they deliberately climbed to a high altitude in order to be detected by Iraqi radar systems, albeit on a false course. Moments later, two of them peeled off and dropped to an extremely low altitude to avoid further detection and subsequently changed course for the Iraqi nuclear facility.

Executed by the Islamic Republic of Iran Air Force, this airstrike was the first such attack on a nuclear reactor and the third attack on any nuclear facility in history: Iran sought to thwart Iraq's progress in nuclear research and development due to the Iran–Iraq War, fearing the possibility of any potential Iraqi nuclear weapons being used on Iranian soil in the future.

Ultimately, the damage inflicted by Iran during Scorch Sword was not absolute and only halted Iraq's nuclear efforts for around three months. However, a second airstrike conducted by Israel on 7 June 1981, codenamed Operation Opera, completely destroyed the Osirak nuclear reactor in a substantial setback for Iraq. A decade later, seven months after the Iraqi invasion of Kuwait, the Tuwaitha Nuclear Research Centre was struck by the United States as part of the Gulf War aerial bombardment campaign.

== Iraqi nuclear program ==
Iraq had established a nuclear program sometime in the 1960s, and in the mid-1970s looked to expand it through the acquisition of a nuclear reactor. After failing to convince the French government to sell them a plutonium-producing reactor and reprocessing plant, and likewise failing to convince the Italian government to sell them a CIRENE-style reactor, the Iraqi government convinced the French government to sell them an Osiris-class research reactor. The purchase also included a smaller accompanying Isis-type reactor, the sale of 72 kilograms of 93% enriched uranium and the training of personnel. The total cost has been given as $300 million. In November 1975 the countries signed a nuclear cooperation agreement and in 1976 the sale of the reactor was finalized.

Construction for the 40-megawatt light-water nuclear reactor began in 1979 at the Al Tuwaitha Nuclear Research Facility, near Baghdad. The main reactor was dubbed Osirak (Osiraq) by the French, blending the name of Iraq with that of the reactor class. Iraq named the main reactor Tammuz 1 (Arabic: تموز) and the smaller Tammuz 2. Tammuz was the Babylonian month when the Ba'ath party had come to power in 1968. In July 1980, Iraq received from France a shipment of approximately 12.5 kilograms of highly enriched uranium (HEU) fuel to be used in the reactor. The shipment was the first of a planned six deliveries totalling 72 kilograms. It was reportedly stipulated in the purchase agreement that no more than two HEU fuel loadings, 25 kilograms, could be in Iraq at any time.

=== Nuclear weapons development ===
Iraq and France claimed that the Iraqi reactor was intended for peaceful scientific research. Agreements between France and Iraq excluded military use. In a 2003 speech, Richard Wilson, a professor of physics at Harvard University who visually inspected the partially damaged reactor in December 1982, said that "to collect enough plutonium [for a nuclear weapon] using Osirak would've taken decades, not years". In 2005, Wilson further commented in The Atlantic:

the Osirak reactor that was bombed by Israel in June of 1981 was explicitly designed by the French engineer Yves Girard to be unsuitable for making bombs. That was obvious to me on my 1982 visit.

Elsewhere Wilson has stated that:

Many claim that the bombing of the Iraqi Osirak reactor delayed Iraq's nuclear bomb program. But the Iraqi nuclear program before 1981 was peaceful, and the Osirak reactor was not only unsuited to making bombs but was under intensive safeguards.

In an interview in 2012, Wilson again emphasised: "The Iraqis couldn't have been developing a nuclear weapon at Osirak. I challenge any scientist in the world to show me how they could have done so."

Contrary to Wilson's opinion, the American private intelligence agency Stratfor wrote in 2007 that the uranium-fueled reactor "was believed to be on the verge of producing plutonium for a weapons program".

Iraq was a signatory to the Nuclear Non-Proliferation Treaty, placing its reactors under International Atomic Energy Agency (IAEA) safeguards. In October 1981, the Bulletin of the Atomic Scientists published excerpts from the testimony of Roger Richter, a former IAEA inspector who described the weaknesses of the agency's nuclear safeguards to the United States Senate Committee on Foreign Relations. Richter testified that only part of Iraq's nuclear installation was under safeguard and that the most sensitive facilities were not even subject to safeguards. IAEA's Director-General Sigvard Eklund issued a rebuttal saying that Richter had never inspected Osirak and had never been assigned to inspect facilities in the Middle East. Eklund claimed that the safeguards procedures were effective and that they were supplemented by precautionary measures taken by the nuclear suppliers. Anthony Fainberg, a physicist at the Brookhaven National Laboratory, disputed Richter's claim that a fuel processing program for the manufacturing of nuclear weapons could have been conducted secretly. Fainberg wrote that there was barely enough fuel on the site to make one bomb, and that the presence of hundreds of foreign technicians would have made it impossible for the Iraqis to take the necessary steps without being discovered.

== Preparations ==
External videos
- News report on French television station TF1 showing a part of the air raid on Tamuz by the Iranian air force. (3 October 1980)

=== Fallout of the Islamic Revolution ===
Iran and Israel, for years prior to the Islamic Revolution, had been monitoring the Osirak nuclear reactor and other potential sites of concern in Iraq. After the Islamic Revolution, the new Islamic Republic heightened surveillance of the reactor (to the point that their relations with France, the builder of the reactor, suffered). Despite official hostility between Khomeini and his allies with Israel and anti-Israeli rhetoric, certain elements of the Iranian and Israeli government sometimes continued to help each other clandestinely because they had a common enemy in the Arab countries. Even as late as 1987, Israeli prime minister Yitzhak Rabin stated: "Iran is our best friend and we don't intend to change our position."

=== Iraqi invasion of Iran ===
When the Iran–Iraq War broke out, the Iranians became increasingly concerned that the Iraqis were developing nuclear weapons to use against them. Before the war, Iran had a contingency plan to attack the plant. However, course of action was met with difficulties in the aftermath of the Islamic Revolution, as Iran had lost the United States as a chief ally and therefore could not adequately maintain the world's fifth-largest military that it had at the time. Spare parts were hard to come by, and many Iranian aerial assets had to be cannibalized. The Israelis secretly shipped some spare parts to Iran to help their air force, though these were ultimately insufficient. Many of Iran's military pilots, officers, and leaders had also been purged (executed by firing squad) after the Islamic Revolution. Furthermore, the Iranians no longer had the benefit of a surprise attack initiative due to the Iraqi invasion of Iran, nor did they have access to American spy satellite footage to assess the facility's layout.

==== Planning ====
The IRIAF (under Javad Fakoori) began to plan out an entirely new plan to attack Osirak. The Iranians had little intelligence about the plant, and there was even a risk that it was already being fuelled, increasing the possibility of radioactive fallout. In a joint plan with Israeli input, the Iranians decided that they would not target the actual reactor itself, but the research laboratories, the reactor control building, and the training facilities.

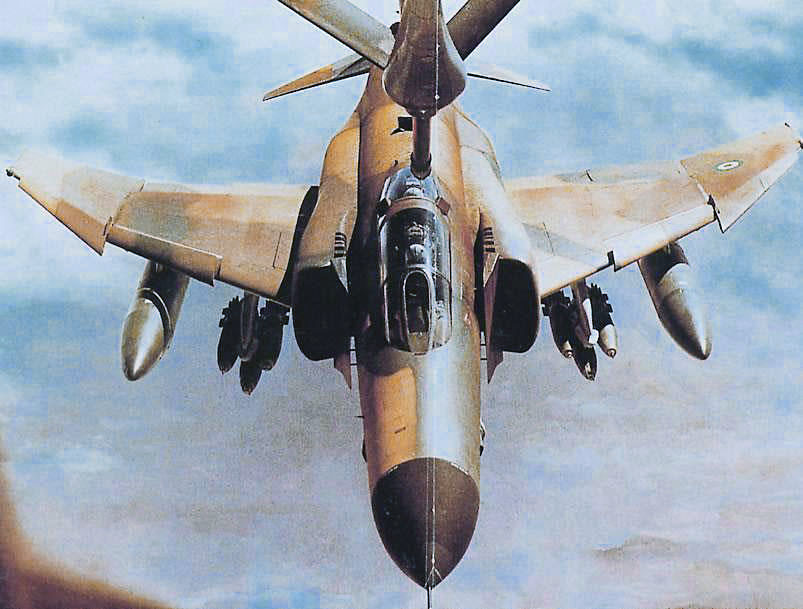
An Iranian F-4 Phantom II being refueled during the Iran–Iraq War, 1982

The Osirak nuclear reactor was defended by a single SA-6 missile battery just over a mile (2 km) to the southeast of the site, three Roland-2 missile batteries mounted in a triangle some 1600 ft (500m) around the reactor, and 40 anti-aircraft artillery positions (23 mm and 57 mm radar guided guns). Due to US sanctions, the Iranian F-4 Phantom fighter-bombers were only able to disrupt the SA-6 (as they were American jammer pods) and were not able to get electronic countermeasure pods to jam the Iraqi Roland. Instead the Iranians had to fly low over the target, and move at high speed and get out quickly; due to this the mission was to be carried out by Iran's most skilled pilots. The major problem was the lack of intelligence- due to the break-down in relations with the US, the IRIAF had no new satellite photographs of the building site, nor were there any new pictures taken from the ground. Israeli and Syrian intelligence agencies both reported that the work on the reactors was advancing, but in the final days before the mission, some doubts surfaced over whether the reactor was finally fueled. The Iranians could not risk causing a nuclear fall-out over Baghdad.

== Execution ==
As September 30 dawned, four F-4 Phantoms of the 33rd Tactical Fighter Squadron, took off from the Nojeh TAB 3, at Kaboodar Ahang, near Hamadan. Flying on a southwesterly course, the formation first approached the Iraqi border in order to meet a Boeing 707-3J9C tanker, escorted by a pair of F-14 Tomcats, in order to refuel mid air. Each Phantom was armed with six Mk.82 GP bombs, two AIM-7E-2 Sparrow air-to-air missiles, and a full load of 20mm ammunition for the M-61A1 Vulcan cannon. After crossing into Iraq in a very low altitude, the formation, led by a colonel, climbed to gain altitude, so the enemy early-warning radars would paint it just long enough for the Iraqis to think they had fixed the direction in which the Iranians were heading. Moments later, the group dropped back to a very low level, where the Iraqis were no longer able to track. Then, the group parted ways, the leading pair continued in the same direction as before, towards a powerplant just south of Baghdad, while the other two Phantoms diverted for Tuwaitha, further west. As the last two F-4 Phantoms approached the Tammuz building site, they remained in a very low altitude, pulling up again at the last moment, barely at 2.4 miles (4 km) from the target, and then remained there for a brief period. To the surprise of the pilots, the Iraqis did not even fire a single missile or shell at them. Approaching on a direct route and executing a perfect attack, the Iranians swiftly sighted their targets east of the reactor buildings, rolled out and released their 12 Mk.82 bombs, remaining in the air over the target for only six seconds. Simultaneously, the two other Phantoms hit their target, taking out the power supply to Baghdad for the next two days. Witnesses reported that at least two Iranian bombs clearly impacted the reactor itself, while the other bombs triggered a voluminous blaze that damaged all the other installations in the complex, such as the cooling pumps, the labs and other support facilities.

== Aftermath ==
=== Reaction in the Western and Arab worlds ===
There was controversy over the results of the Operation Scorch Sword. In the West, the strike was viewed as having caused only "minor damage", the same opinion expressed by the Iraqis. However, soon it turned evident that the strike was clearly successful in disrupting the Iraqi nuclear program, both physically through the strike, and also psychologically, as the Iraqis immediately denounced Iran for "its cooperation with the Zionist enemy", suspecting, together with the French, that the aircraft did not come from Iran but from Israel. Saddam Hussein personally stated that Israeli aircraft had already flown over Iraq, including delivering a strike against Baghdad on 27 July 1980.

=== Israel's Operation Opera (1981) ===
The French intelligence services later on, falsely reported that the September 30 attack on Tuwaitha was carried out by "two unidentified Israeli Phantoms" or aircraft with Iranian markings flown by Israel. Israel emphatically denied all such allegations, pointing to the fact that such an operation would be almost impossible to carry out with their F-4s. In order to confirm the results of the raid, on 30 November 1980, one F-4 Phantom took off from Hamadan in a recon mission over Tuwaitha, in order to gather pictures of the attacked reactor. Flying at low level, the Phantom made a single pass over Osirak, taking the desired pictures. Despite being fired at by several Iraqi AAA and SAM sites, the RF-4E Phantom avoided them and returned safely into Iran. Later on, and once analysed the classified pictures, these confirmed that the attack was successful, presenting the damaged infrastructure of the nuclear complex. Despite rumors and cover-up attempts, the facts clearly present a successful airstrike, that was successful in achieving its main aim of delaying and damaging the Iraqi nuclear program. The results and the experiences achieved by the IRIAF in this operation, proved crucial for another country, Israel. Just as concerned as Iran with the Iraqi nuclear program, the IRIAF operation proved useful for the IAF in order to prepare the final blow to the Iraqi nuclear program. This final blow, would came up on June 7, 1981, in the Operation Opera, almost nine months after this Iranian operation.

== See also ==
- Operation Opera
