= Operation Opera =

1981 Israeli airstrike on an Iraqi nuclear reactor

- Part of the Arab–Israeli conflict
- Operational scope: Strategic
- Location: Tuwaitha Nuclear Research Center, Diyala Governorate, Iraq; 33°12′12″N 44°31′07″E
- Planned by: Menachem Begin (Prime Minister of Israel); David Ivry (Commander, Israeli Air Force)
- Objective: Destruction of Iraq's Osirak nuclear reactor
- Date: 7 June 1981
- Executed by: Israeli Air Force
- Outcome: Israeli operational success: Osirak nuclear reactor destroyed; Iraqi nuclear program severely disturbed
- Casualties: 10 Iraqi soldiers, 1 French civilian killed
- Location of the Osirak nuclear reactor within Iraq

Operation Opera (Hebrew: מִבְצָע אוֹפֵּרָה), also known as Operation Babylon, was a surprise airstrike conducted by the Israeli Air Force on 7 June 1981, which destroyed an unfinished Iraqi nuclear reactor located 17 kilometres (11 miles) southeast of Baghdad, Iraq. The Israeli operation came a year after the Islamic Republic of Iran Air Force had caused minor damage to the same nuclear facility in Operation Scorch Sword, with the damage having been subsequently repaired by French technicians. Operation Opera, and related Israeli government statements following it, established the Begin Doctrine, which explicitly stated the strike was not an anomaly, but instead "a precedent for every future government in Israel". Israel's counter-proliferation preventive strike added another dimension to its existing policy of deliberate ambiguity, as it related to the nuclear weapons capability of other states in the region.

In 1976, Iraq purchased an Osiris-class nuclear reactor from France. While Iraq and France maintained that the reactor, named Osirak by the French, was intended for peaceful scientific research, the Israelis viewed the reactor with suspicion, believing it was designed to produce nuclear weapons that could escalate the ongoing Arab–Israeli conflict. On 7 June 1981, a flight of Israeli Air Force F-16A fighter aircraft, with an escort of F-15As, bombed the Osirak reactor deep inside Iraq. Israel called the operation an act of self-defense, saying that the reactor had "less than a month to go" before "it might have become critical." The airstrike reportedly killed ten Iraqi soldiers and one French civilian. The attack took place about three weeks before the 1981 Israeli legislative elections for the Knesset.

At the time of its occurrence, the attack was met with sharp international criticism, including in the United States, and Israel was rebuked by the United Nations Security Council and General Assembly in two separate resolutions. Media reactions were also negative: "Israel's sneak attack ... was an act of inexcusable and short-sighted aggression", wrote The New York Times, while the Los Angeles Times called it "state-sponsored terrorism". The destruction of Iraq's Osirak reactor has been cited as an example of a preventive strike in contemporary scholarship on international law. The efficacy of the attack is debated by historians, who acknowledge that it brought Iraq back from the brink of nuclear capability but drove its weapons program underground and cemented Iraqi president Saddam Hussein's future ambitions for acquiring nuclear weapons.

== Iraq's nuclear program ==
The Osirak reactor prior to the Israeli attack

Iraq had established a nuclear program sometime in the 1960s, and in the mid-1970s looked to expand it through the acquisition of a nuclear reactor. After failing to convince the French Government to sell them a gas cooled graphite moderated plutonium-producing reactor and reprocessing plant, and likewise failing to convince the Italian government to sell them a Cirene reactor, the Iraqi government convinced the French government to sell them an Osiris-class research reactor. The purchase also included a smaller accompanying Isis-type reactor, the sale of 72 kilograms of 93% enriched uranium and the training of personnel. The total cost has been given as $300 million (equivalent to $1.62 billion in 2025). In November 1975, the countries signed a nuclear cooperation agreement and in 1976, the sale of the reactor was finalized.

Construction for the 40-megawatt light-water nuclear reactor began in 1979 at the Al Tuwaitha Nuclear Center near Baghdad. The main reactor was dubbed Osirak (Osiraq) by the French, blending the name of Iraq with that of the reactor class. Iraq named the main reactor Tammuz 1 (Arabic: تموز) and the smaller Tammuz 2. Tammuz was the Babylonian month when the Ba'ath Party had come to power in 1968. On 6 April 1979, Israeli agents sabotaged the Osirak reactor awaiting shipment to Iraq at La Seyne-sur-Mer in France. On 14 June 1980, Mossad agents assassinated Yahya El Mashad, an Egyptian nuclear scientist who headed the Iraqi nuclear program, in a hotel in Paris. In July 1980, Iraq received from France a shipment of approximately 12.5 kilograms of highly enriched uranium fuel to be used in the reactor. The shipment was the first of a planned six deliveries totalling 72 kilograms. It was reportedly stipulated in the purchase agreement that no more than two HEU fuel loadings, 24 kilograms, could be in Iraq at any time.

Iraq and France claimed that the Iraqi reactor was intended for peaceful scientific research. Agreements between France and Iraq excluded military use. The American private intelligence agency STRATFOR wrote in 2007 that the uranium-fueled reactor "was believed to be on the verge of producing plutonium for a weapons program". In a 2003 speech, Richard Wilson, a professor of physics at Harvard University who visually inspected the partially damaged reactor in December 1982, said that "to collect enough plutonium [for a nuclear weapon] using Osirak would've taken decades, not years". In 2005, Wilson further commented in The Atlantic: "The Osirak reactor that was bombed by Israel in June 1981 was explicitly designed by the French engineer Yves Girard to be unsuitable for making bombs. That was obvious to me on my 1982 visit". Elsewhere Wilson has stated that contrary to claims that the bombing of the Iraqi Osirak reactor delayed Iraq's nuclear bomb program, the Iraqi nuclear program before 1981 was peaceful, and the Osirak reactor was not only unsuited to making bombs but was under intensive safeguards.

In an interview in 2012, Wilson again emphasised: "The Iraqis couldn't have been developing a nuclear weapon at Osirak. I challenge any scientist in the world to show me how they could have done so."

Iraq was a signatory to the Nuclear Non-Proliferation Treaty, placing its reactors under International Atomic Energy Agency (IAEA) safeguards. In October 1981, the Bulletin of the Atomic Scientists published excerpts from the testimony of Roger Richter, a former IAEA inspector who described the weaknesses of the agency's nuclear safeguards to the United States Senate Committee on Foreign Relations. Richter testified that only part of Iraq's nuclear installation was under safeguard and that the most sensitive facilities were not even subject to safeguards. IAEA's Director-General Sigvard Eklund issued a rebuttal saying that Richter had never inspected Osirak and had never been assigned to inspect facilities in the Middle East. Eklund claimed that the safeguards procedures were effective and that they were supplemented by precautionary measures taken by the nuclear suppliers. Anthony Fainberg, a physicist at the Brookhaven National Laboratory, disputed Richter's claim that a fuel processing program for the manufacturing of nuclear weapons could have been conducted secretly. Fainberg wrote that there was barely enough fuel on the site to make one bomb, and that the presence of hundreds of foreign technicians would have made it impossible for the Iraqis to take the necessary steps without being discovered.

== Strategy and diplomacy ==
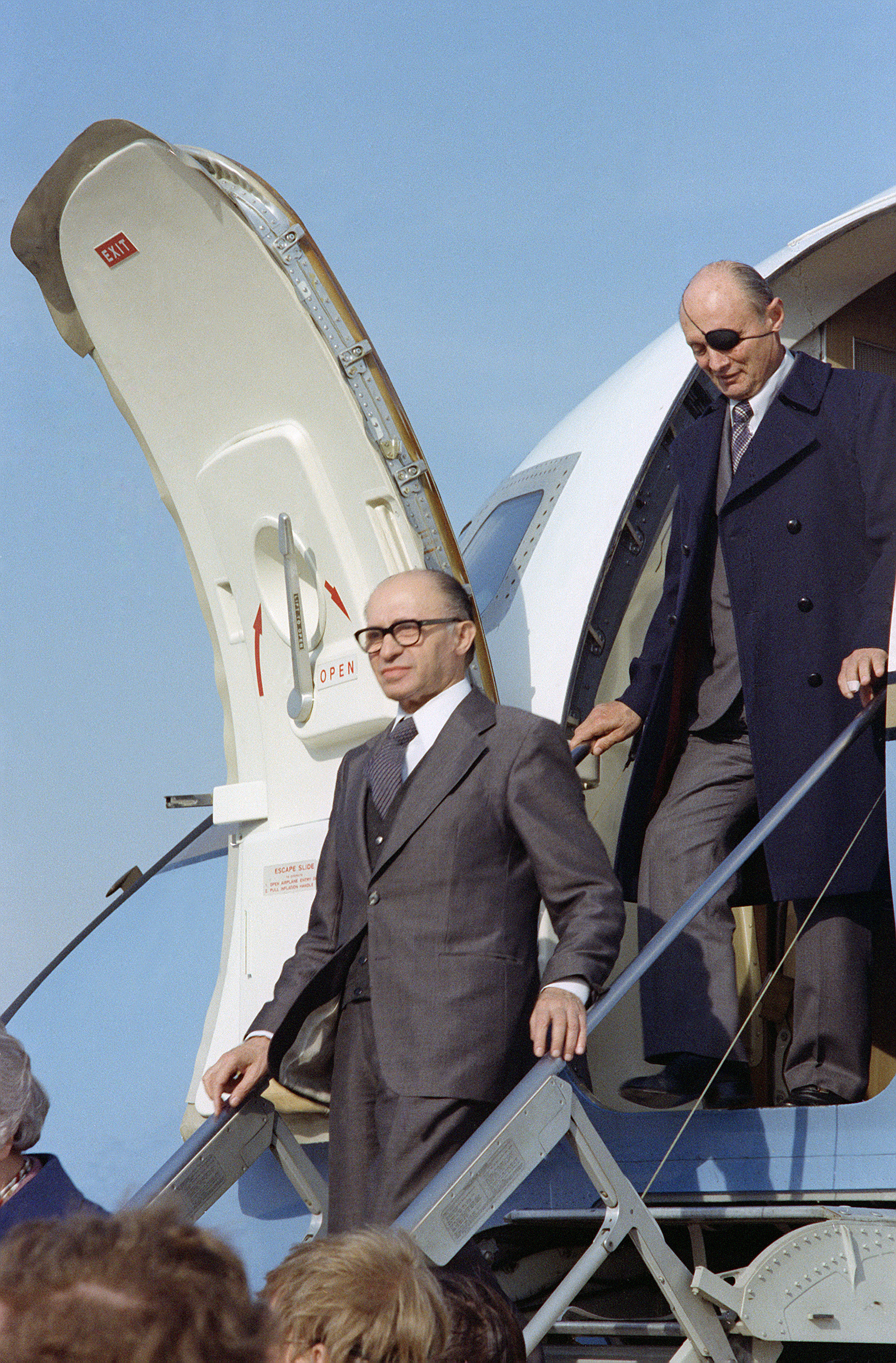
Menachem Begin, Prime Minister of Israel and in charge of the operation, disembarks from an aircraft upon his arrival in the United States, accompanied by Israeli Foreign Minister Moshe Dayan.

In Israel, discussions on which strategy to adopt in response to the Iraqi reactor development were taking place as early as Yitzhak Rabin's first term in office (1974–1977). Reportedly, planning and training for the operation began during this time. After Menachem Begin became Prime Minister in 1977 the preparations intensified; Begin authorized the building of a full-scale model of the Iraqi reactor which Israeli pilots could practice bombing. Three Israeli pilots died in accidents while training for the mission.

Israel's Foreign Minister Moshe Dayan initiated diplomatic negotiations with France, the United States and Italy (Israel maintained that some Italian firms acted as suppliers and sub-contractors) over the matter but failed to obtain assurances that the reactor program would be halted. In addition Israel was not able to convince the French governments of Valéry Giscard d'Estaing and François Mitterrand to cease aiding the Iraqi nuclear program. Saddam Hussein consistently maintained that Osirak was intended for peaceful purposes. Begin considered the diplomatic options fruitless, and worried that prolonging the decision to attack would lead to a fatal inability to act in response to the perceived threat. According to Karl P. Mueller, in the spring of 1979, Begin had reached the conclusion that an anticipatory attack was necessary.

Anthony Cordesman writes that the Israeli intelligence agency Mossad conducted a series of clandestine operations to halt construction or destroy the reactor. In April 1979, Mossad agents in France allegedly planted a bomb that destroyed the reactor's first set of core structures while they were awaiting shipment to Iraq. In June 1980, Mossad agents are said to have assassinated Yehia El Mashad, an Egyptian atomic scientist working on the Iraqi nuclear program. Shortly afterward, two other Iraqi engineers working on the program, Salman Rashid and Abdul Rasul, fell ill and died on trips to Switzerland and France respectively, with Mossad suspected of having poisoned them. It has also been claimed that the Mossad bombed several of the French and Italian companies it suspected of working on the project, and sent threatening letters to top officials and technicians, causing several French technicians to resign. Following the bombing in April 1979, France inserted a clause in its agreement with Iraq saying that French personnel would have to supervise the Osirak reactor on-site for a period of ten years.

The alleged assassinations caused widespread panic among Iraqi nuclear scientists. Saddam Hussein, worried over the effect on the morale of the project's scientists, awarded cash bonuses and luxury cars to all senior scientists. Meshad's widow was awarded $300,000 and promised that she and her children would receive a lifelong pension. Iraqi scientists were given financial bonuses for international travel, which they had become increasingly fearful of, and received instructions on how to avoid potential Mossad assassinations.

=== Iranian attack ===
In an air attack codenamed Operation Scorch Sword, Iran attacked and damaged the site on 30 September 1980, with two F-4 Phantoms, shortly after the outbreak of the Iran–Iraq War. At the onset of the war, Yehoshua Sagi, director of the Israeli Military Intelligence Directorate, publicly urged the Iranians to bomb the reactor. The attack was the first on a nuclear reactor and only the third on a nuclear facility in history. It was also the first instance of a preventive attack on a nuclear reactor which aimed to forestall the development of a nuclear weapon.

Due to last minute Iranian concerns that the reactor had been already fueled and could release radioactive fallout if hit, they did not attack the actual reactor dome, but the control room, research/centrifuge facilities, and the adjacent buildings. The targets were struck and the buildings were damaged, along with the plant cooling mechanisms. Two other F-4s simultaneously hit Baghdad's main power plant, knocking the city's electricity out for nearly two days. The Iraqis denied any major damage. The French and Italian technicians promptly left Iraq, and nearly withdrew from the project, but some later returned in February 1981 and began to repair the damage.

Trita Parsi, in the book Treacherous Alliance: The Secret Dealings of Israel, Iran, and the United States, writes that a senior Israeli official met with a representative of the Ayatollah Khomeini in France one month prior to the Israeli attack. The source of the assertion is Ari Ben-Menashe, a former Israeli government employee. At the alleged meeting, the Iranians explained details of their 1980 attack on the site, and agreed to let Israeli planes land at an Iranian airfield in Tabriz in the case of an emergency. While the new Iranian government was officially hostile to Israel, due to both nations having a common enemy (Iraq), and Iranian fears that the Iraqis would create an atomic bomb to use on them, they clandestinely worked with Israel to forestall such a development.

=== Operational planning ===
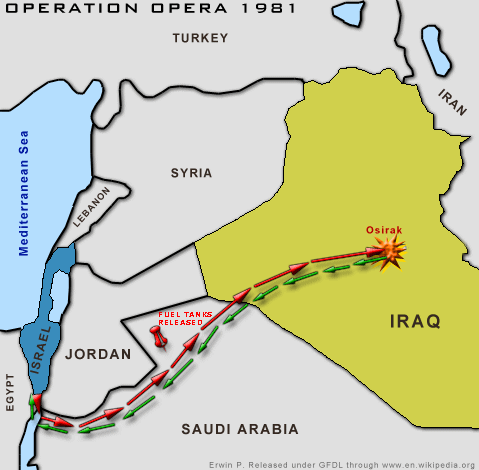
Scheme of operation

The distance between Israeli military bases and the reactor site was significant—over 1,600 km (990 mi; 860 nmi). The Israeli planes would have to violate Jordanian and/or Saudi airspace in a covert flight over foreign territory, making mid-air refueling unfeasible. The Israelis eventually concluded that a squadron of heavily fueled and heavily armed F-16As, with a group of F-15As to provide air cover and fighter support, could perform a surgical strike to eliminate the reactor site without having to refuel.

The decision to go through with the operation was hotly contested within Begin's government. Ariel Sharon, a member of the Security Cabinet, later said that he was among those who advocated bombing the reactor. Dayan, Defense Minister (until late 1980) Ezer Weizman and Deputy Prime Minister Yigael Yadin were among those opposed. According to Mueller, "the principal difference between the hawks and doves on this issue lay in their estimation of the likely international political costs of an air strike". Shai Feldman specifies that "[those opposed] feared that the operation would derail the fragile Israeli-Egyptian peace process, fuel Arab anxieties about Israel's profile in the region, and damage Israel-French relations". Begin and his supporters, including Sharon, were far less pessimistic than their opponents about the political fallout. Yehoshua Saguy argued for continued efforts in trying to find a non-military solution as it would take the Iraqis five to ten years to produce the material necessary for a nuclear weapon. In the end, Begin chose to order the attack based on a worst-case estimate where a weapon could be created in one to two years time. According to Ronen Bergman, Mossad director Yitzhak Hofi told Begin in October 1980 that the Mossad's campaign of assassinations and sabotage could not stop the Iraqi nuclear program and that the only way to put an end to it was an airstrike.

Prime Minister Begin defended the timing of the bombing stating that a later attack, after the reactor had become operational, could cause lethal radioactive contamination doses to reach all the way to Baghdad. An analysis by Warren Donnelly of the United States Congressional Research Service concluded that "it would be most unlikely for an attack with conventional bombs upon the reactor when operating to have caused lethal exposures to radioactivity in Baghdad, although some people at the reactor site might receive some exposure". This was similarly the conclusion of Herbert Goldstein of Columbia University using IAEA release factors, the lethal contamination would be confined to a close proximity to the reactor and small amounts of radiation would be detectable in Baghdad under the assumption that winds were blowing in that direction.

In October 1980, Mossad reported to Begin that the Osirak reactor would be fueled and operational by June 1981. This assessment was significantly aided by reconnaissance photos supplied by the United States, specifically using the KH-11 KENNEN satellite. French technicians installing the reactor later said it was scheduled to become operational only by the end of 1981. Nonetheless, in October 1980, the Israeli cabinet (with Dayan absent) finally voted 10–6 in favor of launching the attack.

=== Preliminary Israeli/Iranian actions ===
After the approval for Operation Opera, the Israelis began to plan their mission against Osirak. The basic procedure for the airstrike had been formulated as early as 1979. However, the Israelis needed photographic intelligence about the layout of the plant. That task allegedly fell to the Iranians. Rather than carrying out a follow-up air raid after their September attack, on 30 November 1980, an Iranian F-4 Phantom reconnaissance jet took pictures of the Osirak reactor. The photographs were allegedly placed in a top-secret metal container, and certain elements of the Iranian military delivered them to the Israelis. With these photographs, the Israelis began to plan out Operation Opera.

A team of Israeli pilots using A-4 Skyhawk aircraft began practicing over the Mediterranean Sea for the raid. The Israelis shortly afterwards received their first agreed delivery of F-16 Fighting Falcon aircraft (the first batch was originally earmarked for Iran, but because of the Iranian Revolution of 1979, the Israeli Air Force received theirs ahead of schedule). The new F-16s would be used for the raid. Israeli F-4 Phantoms also ran reconnaissance missions over areas of southern and western Iraq. While the Iraqi Air Force was busy fighting the Iranians, on one occasion, an Iraqi MiG-21 chased an Israeli F-4; the Iraqi jet ran out of fuel and the pilot was forced to eject. However, in their missions, the Israelis discovered a blind area on Iraqi radar, on the border with Saudi Arabia. While the Iraqis were aware of the blind area, they did not remedy the problem because they did not expect a war with Saudi Arabia.

The Iraqi Air Force was a potential threat to the Israelis (as the MiG-21 interception showed) and it somewhat deterred Israel from attacking yet. However, Israel had an advantage in that Iraq was preoccupied fighting Iran. On 4 April 1981, the Iranian Air Force launched a major attack on Iraq's H-3 airbase in the western part of the country (near Jordan and Israel). Eight Iranian F-4 Phantoms carried out the long range bombing mission and struck the airbase. Iran claimed that 48 Iraqi aircraft were destroyed, although US intelligence concluded that 27 aircraft were destroyed and 11 others damaged. Among the aircraft hit were two Tu-22 Blinder and three Tu-16 Badger strategic bombers (which could have been used to retaliate against Israel in the event of an attack). The attack was a severe blow to Iraqi airpower, and largely gave Iran air superiority over Iraq. Israeli reconnaissance planes had been monitoring Iraq during the attack, and observed that the Iraqi Air Force had been severely degraded and their retaliatory capacity had been weakened.

== Attack ==
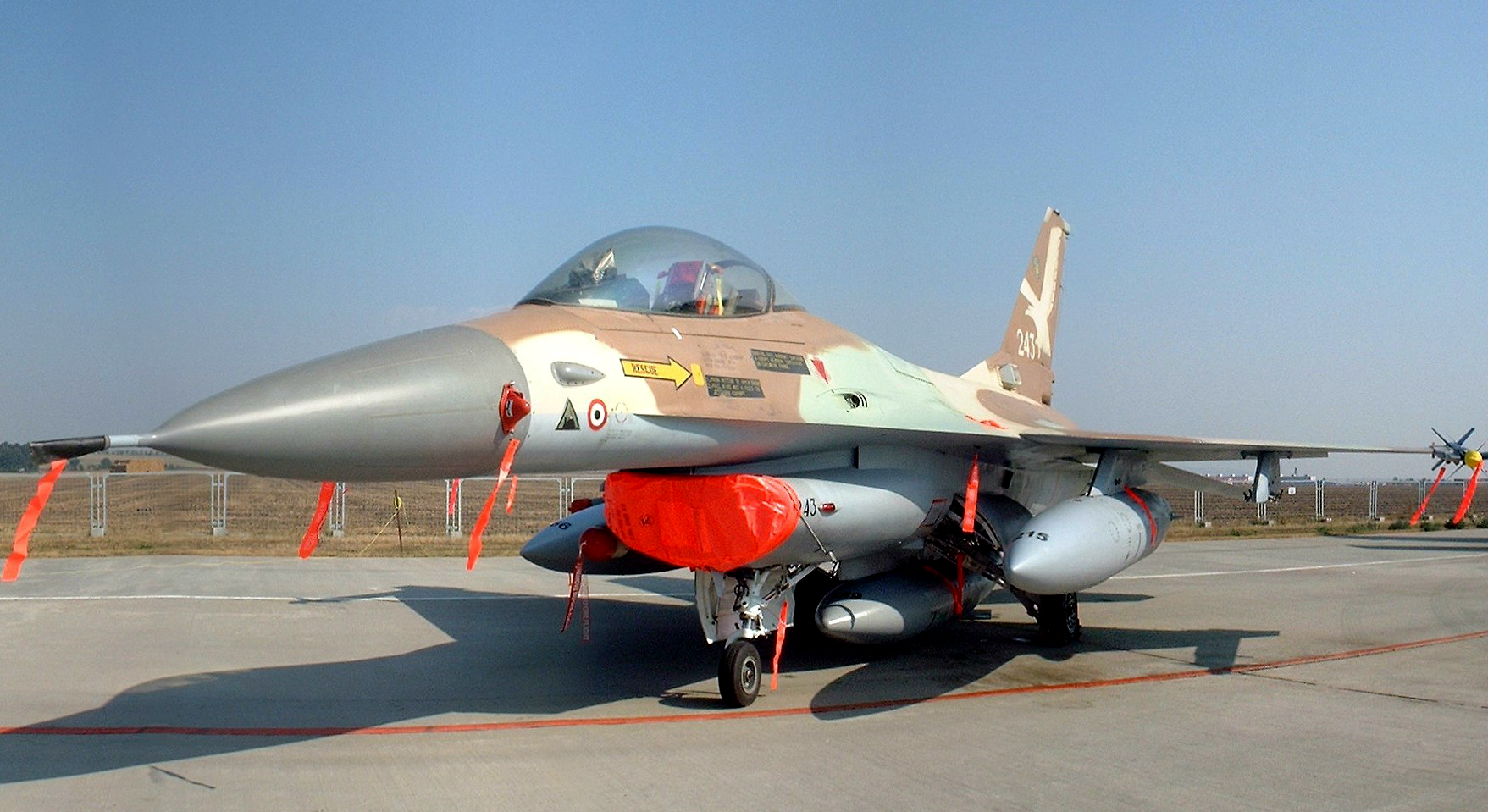
F-16A Netz #243, flown by Colonel Ilan Ramon in Operation Opera. Here of 140 Squadron "Golden Eagle" (see tail), but at that time of 110 Squadron "Knights Of The North" at Ramat David Airbase.

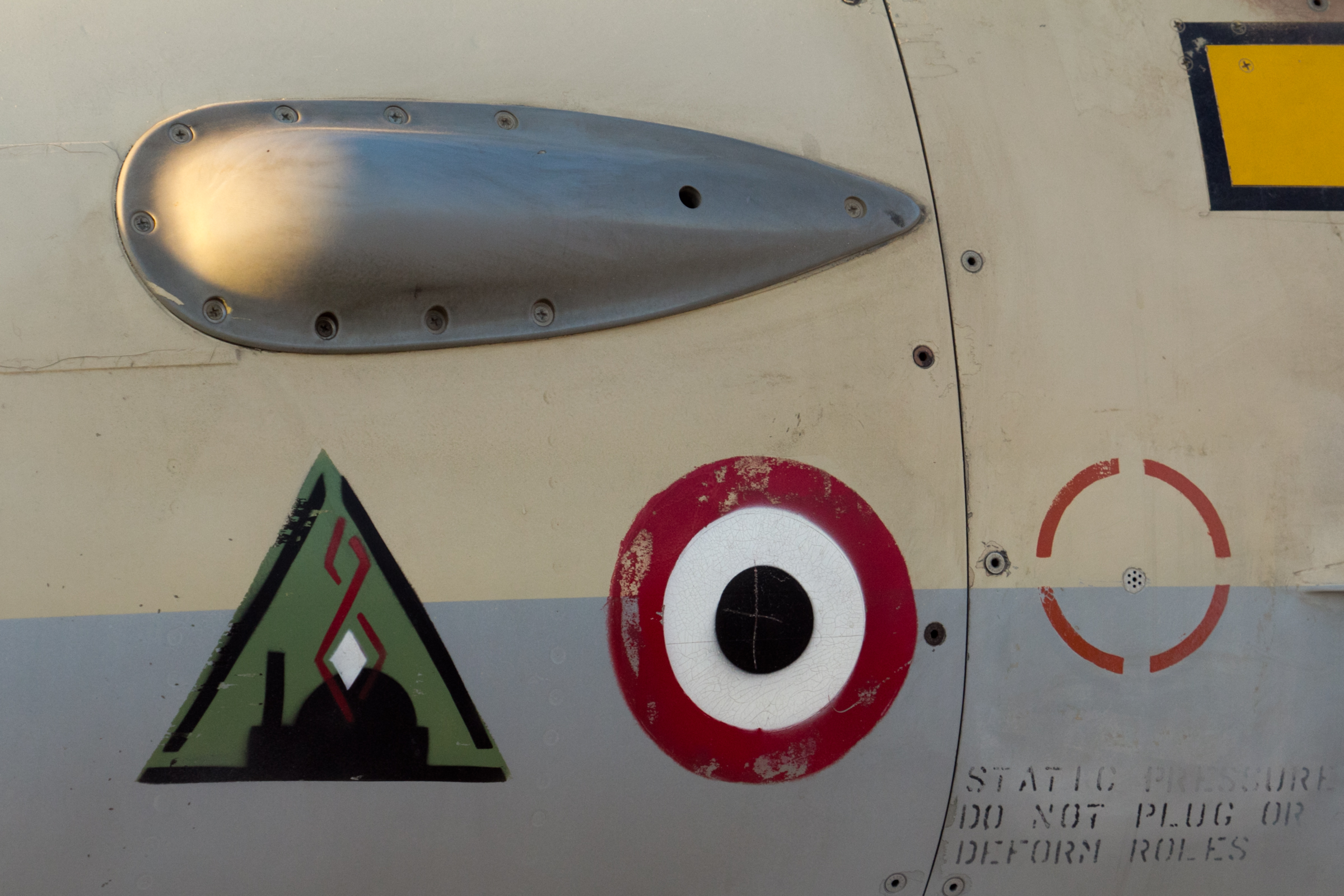
Nose of F-16A #243 showing the triangular mission marking for the attack, a nuclear reactor silhouette against the Iraqi Air Force emblem.

Yehuda Zvi Blum, in a speech to the United Nations Security Council following the attack, claimed that the operation was launched on a Sunday afternoon under the assumption that workers present on the site, including foreign experts employed at the reactor, would have left. Notwithstanding this precaution, there were hundreds of French workers and other nationals at the plant at the time of the raid.

The attack squadron consisted of eight F-16As, each with two unguided Mark-84 2,000-pound (910 kg) delay-action bombs. A flight of six F-15As was assigned to the operation to provide fighter support. The F-16 pilots were Ze'ev Raz, Amos Yadlin, Dobbi Yaffe, Hagai Katz, Amir Nachumi, Iftach Spector, Relik Shafir, and Ilan Ramon. Raz led the attack and was later decorated by the Chief of Staff for his leadership. Ramon, who was the youngest pilot to participate in the operation, later became the first Israeli astronaut and died in the Space Shuttle Columbia disaster.

The operation started on 7 June 1981, at 15:55 local time (12:55 GMT). The Israeli planes left Etzion Airbase, flying unchallenged in Jordanian and Saudi airspace. To avoid detection, the Israeli pilots conversed in Saudi-accented Arabic while in Jordanian airspace and told Jordanian air controllers that they were a Saudi patrol that had gone off course. While flying over Saudi Arabia, they pretended to be Jordanians, using Jordanian radio signals and formations. The Israeli planes were so heavily loaded that the external fuel tanks that had been mounted on the planes were exhausted in-flight. The tanks were jettisoned over the Saudi desert.

King Hussein of Jordan, vacationing in the Gulf of Aqaba, witnessed the planes overfly his yacht, and noticed their Israeli markings. Taking into account the location, heading, and armament of the jets, Hussein quickly deduced the Iraqi reactor to be the most probable target. Hussein immediately contacted his government and ordered a warning to be sent to the Iraqis. However, due to a communication failure the message was never received and the Israeli planes entered Iraqi airspace undetected. Upon reaching Iraqi airspace, the squadron split up, with two of the F-15s forming close escort to the F-16 squadron, and the remaining F-15s dispersing into Iraqi airspace as a diversion and ready back-up. The attack squadron descended to 30 m (98 ft) over the Iraqi desert, attempting to fly under the radar of the Iraqi defences.

At 18:35 local time (14:35 GMT), 20 km (12 mi) from the Osirak reactor complex, the F-16 formation climbed to 2,100 m (6,900 ft) and went into a 35-degree dive at 1,100 km/h (680 mph), aimed at the reactor complex. At 1,100 m (3,600 ft), the F-16s began releasing the Mark 84 bombs in pairs, at 5-second intervals. At least eight of the sixteen released bombs struck the containment dome of the reactor. It was later revealed that half an hour before the Israeli planes arrived, a group of Iraqi soldiers manning anti-aircraft defenses had left their posts for an afternoon meal, turning off their radars. The Israeli planes were still intercepted by Iraqi defenses but managed to evade the remaining anti-aircraft fire. The squadron climbed to high altitude and started their return to Israel. The attack lasted less than two minutes.

== International political reactions ==
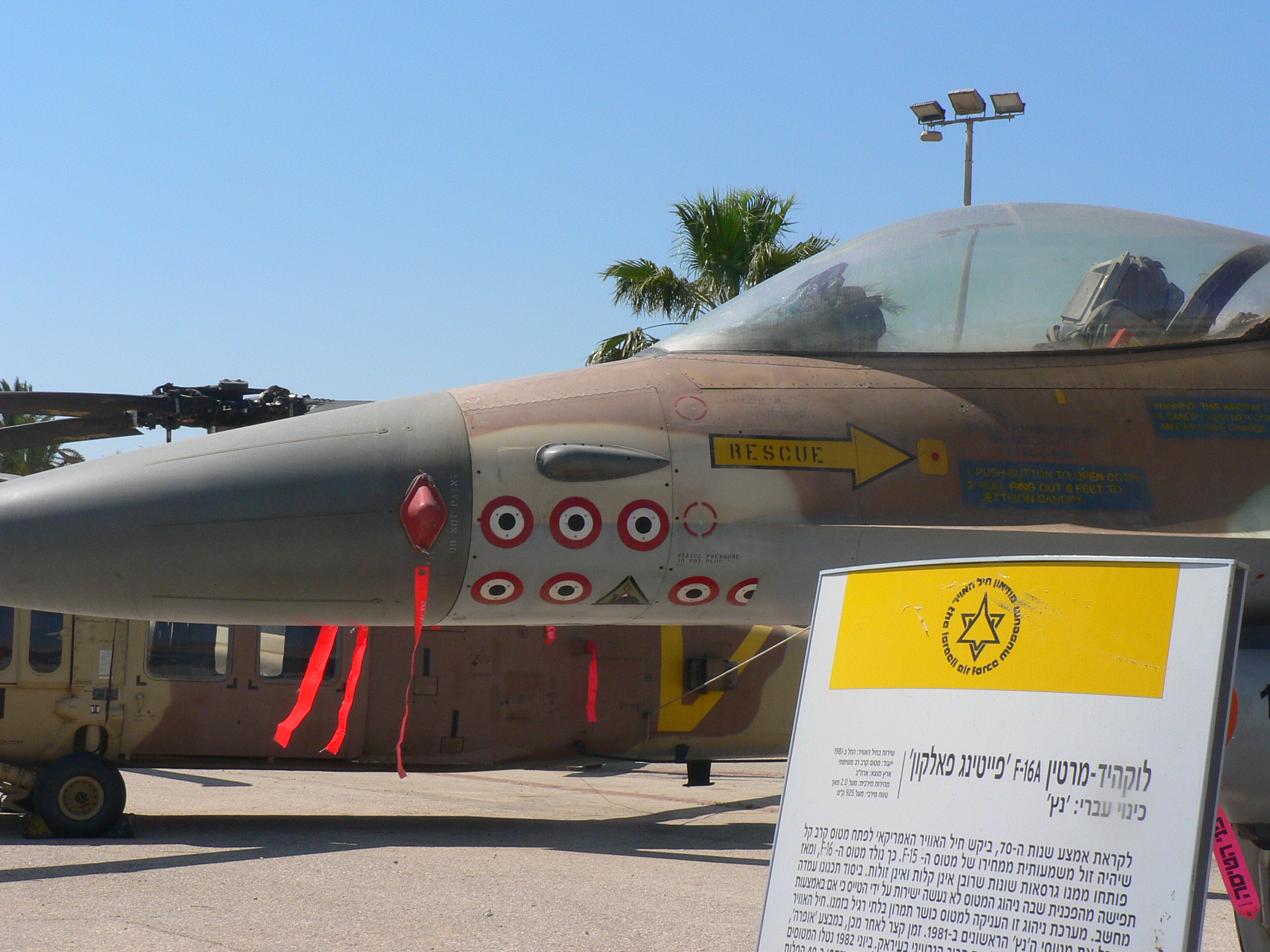
IAF F-16A Netz 107 with Osirak bombing mark.

International response at the United Nations took two paths. The United Nations Security Council issued a unanimous and almost immediate response on 19 June 1981, following eight meetings and statements from Iraq and the International Atomic Energy Agency. Security Council Resolution 487 strongly condemned the attack as a "clear violation of the Charter of the United Nations and the norms of international conduct" and called on Israel to refrain from such attacks in the future; the Council recognised the right of Iraq to "establish programmes of technological and nuclear development" and called for Israel to join Iraq within the "IAEA safeguards regime" of the Nuclear Non-Proliferation Treaty. The council also stated its consideration that Iraq was "entitled to appropriate redress for the destruction it has suffered." The United States voted for the resolution and suspended the delivery of four F-16 aircraft to Israel, but blocked punitive action by the UN. The suspension on the delivery of the aircraft was lifted two months later.

The UN General Assembly followed the Security Council with Resolution No. 36/27 on 13 November 1981, expressing deep alarm and condemning Israel over the "premeditated and unprecedented act of aggression," and demanding that Israel pay prompt and adequate compensation for the damage and loss of life it had caused. The resolution also solemnly warned Israel to refrain from taking such measures in the future.

Debate prior to passage of the UN resolution reflected member states' differing positions on issues such as nuclear proliferation in the region and the appropriateness and justifiability of Israel's actions. The Iraqi representative stated that "the motives behind the Israeli attack were to cover up Israel's possession of nuclear weapons and, more importantly, the determination not to allow the Arab nation to acquire scientific or technical knowledge." Syria requested condemnation not only of Israel for terrorism against Arab peoples, but also of the United States, "which continue[s] to provide Israel with instruments of destruction as part of its strategic alliance."

The representative of France stated that the sole purpose of the reactor was scientific research. Agreements between France and Iraq excluded military use. The United Kingdom said it did not believe Iraq had the capacity to manufacture fissionable materials for nuclear weapons. The IAEA Director-General confirmed that inspections of the nuclear research reactors near Baghdad revealed no non-compliance with the safeguards agreement.

The IAEA's Board of Governors convened on 9–12 June and condemned Israel's action. The Board further asked that the prospect of suspending Israel's privileges and rights of membership be considered at the next General Conference held by the organization. On 26 September 1981, the IAEA Conference condemned the attack and voted to suspend all technical assistance to Israel. A draft resolution was introduced to expel Israel from the IAEA, but the proposition was defeated. The United States argued that the attack was not a violation of the IAEA Statute and that punitive action against Israel would do great harm to the IAEA and the non-proliferation regime.

The attack was strongly criticized around the world, including in the United States. Jonathan Steele, writing in The Guardian, described the reaction:

The world was outraged by Israel's raid on 7 June 1981. "Armed attack in such circumstances cannot be justified. It represents a grave breach of international law," Margaret Thatcher thundered. Jeane Kirkpatrick, the U.S. ambassador to the UN and as stern a lecturer as Britain's then prime minister, described it as "shocking" and compared it to the Soviet invasion of Afghanistan. American newspapers were as fulsome. "Israel's sneak attack ... was an act of inexcusable and short-sighted aggression," said the New York Times. The Los Angeles Times called it "state-sponsored terrorism".

Privately, President Reagan wrote in his journal on the day of the attack, "I swear I believe Armageddon is near," adding of Begin's decision, "He should have told us & the French, we could have done something to remove the threat."

=== Aftermath ===
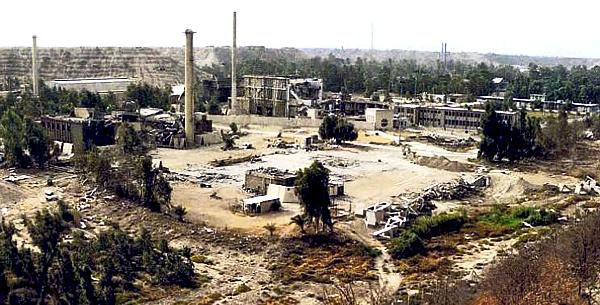
Osirak reactor site in the aftermath of the attack

Ten Iraqi soldiers and one French civilian were killed in the attack. The civilian killed was engineer Damien Chaussepied, variously described as 24 or 25 years old, who was an employee of Air Liquide and the French governmental agency CEA. In 1981, Israel agreed to pay restitution to Chaussepied's family.

Iraq said it would rebuild the facility and France agreed, in principle, to aid in the reconstruction. Because of a mix of factors, including the Iran–Iraq War, international pressure and Iraqi payment problems, negotiations broke down in 1984 and France withdrew from the project. The Osirak facility remained in its damaged state until the 1991 Persian Gulf War, when it was completely destroyed by subsequent coalition air strikes by the United States Air Force, one of them being the Package Q Strike. During the war, 100 out of 120 members of the Knesset signed a letter of appreciation to Menachem Begin, thanking him for ordering the attack on Osirak. In July 1991, Begin, in a rare interview granted to Israeli Army Radio, claimed that the Gulf War, and especially the Iraqi Scud missile attacks on Israel during that war, vindicated his decision to bomb the reactor.

In response to their failures to prevent the Osirak attack (and the earlier H-3 attack), Saddam Hussein ordered the execution of Colonel Fakhri Hussein Jaber, the head of Iraq's Western Air Defense Zone, and all officers under his command above the rank of major. In addition, 23 other Iraqi pilots and officers were imprisoned.

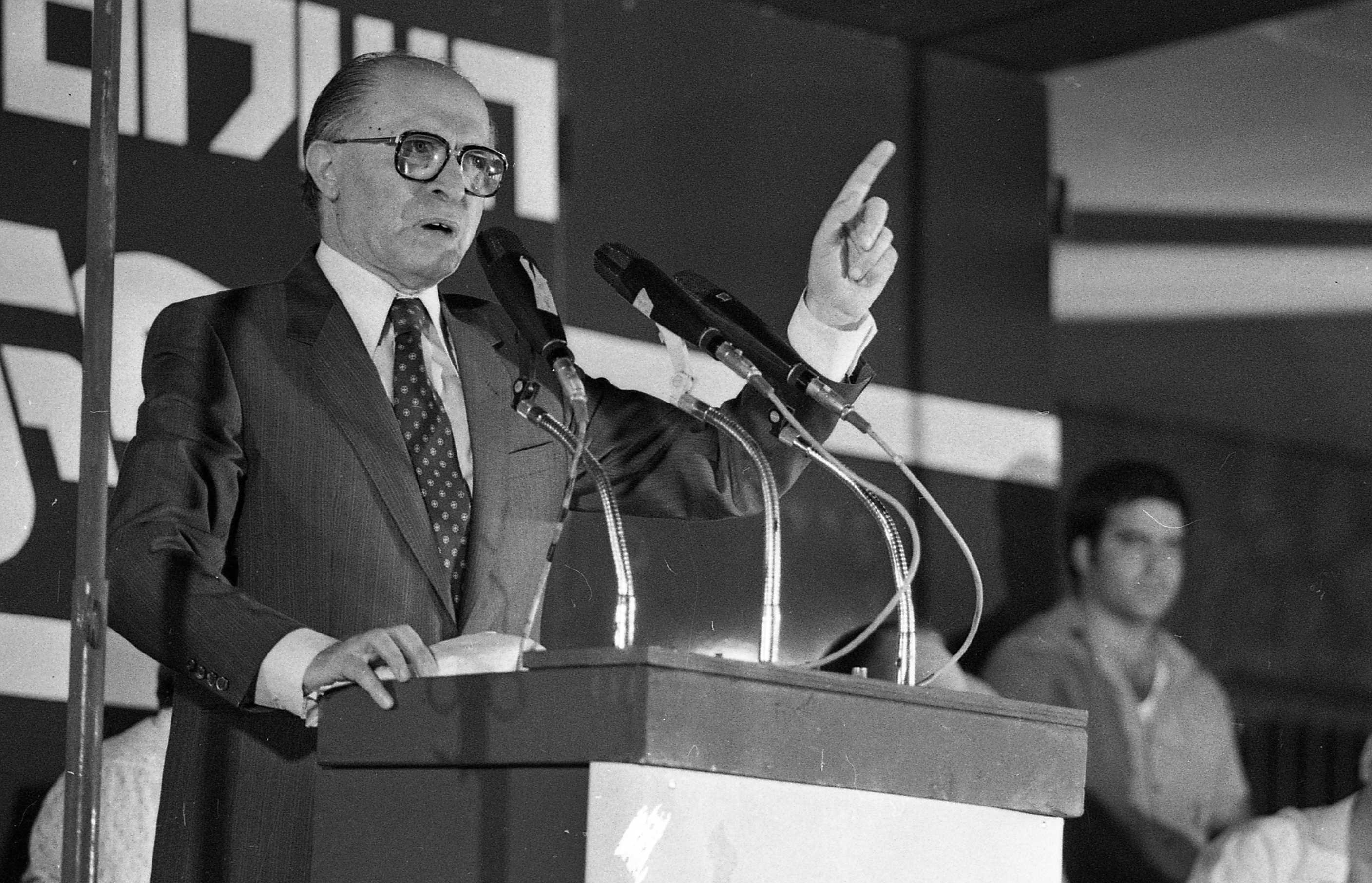
Begin at a press conference following the attack on the reactor, 10 June 1981

The attack took place approximately three weeks before the Israeli legislative election of 1981. Opposition leader Shimon Peres criticized the operation as a political ploy, which did not go over well with the electorate. Dan Perry writes that "the Osirak bombing—and Peres's poor political judgement in criticizing it—were crucial in turning the tide of what initially had seemed to be a hopeless election campaign for Likud". Begin responded to Peres's accusation at a Likud rally: "Jews, you have known me for forty years, since I lived in the Hassidoff neighborhood of Petah Tikva to fight for the Jewish people (a reference to Begin's incognito days in the Irgun). Would I send Jewish boys to risk death—or captivity worse than death, because those barbarians would have tortured our boys horribly—for elections?" On 30 June, Likud was reelected over Peres's Alignment party, winning by just one seat in the Knesset.

The US government had been caught completely off-guard by the attack. A former senior official in US intelligence told Israeli journalist Ronen Bergman that the failure to detect preparations for the attack was perceived as a grave intelligence failure within the US intelligence community, and that it led to a special team within US intelligence being set up to investigate the failure to detect preparations for an operation of this magnitude within the Israeli Air Force, military intelligence, the Mossad, and political system.

In 2009, the Prime Minister of Iraq Nouri al-Maliki demanded that Israel compensate Iraq for the destruction of the reactor. An Iraqi official asserted that Iraq's right to redress is supported by Resolution 487 adopted by the United Nations Security Council in response to the attack. In early 2010, The Siasat Daily, citing an unnamed Iraqi parliament member, reported that Iraqi officials had received word from the UN Secretariat that the Iraqi government was entitled to seek compensation from Israel for damage caused by the attack.

== Assessment ==
Israel claims that the attack impeded Iraq's nuclear ambitions by at least ten years. In an interview in 2005, Bill Clinton expressed support for the attack: "everybody talks about what the Israelis did at Osiraq, in 1981, which, I think, in retrospect, was a really good thing. You know, it kept Saddam from developing nuclear power." Louis René Beres wrote in 1995 that "[h]ad it not been for the brilliant raid at Osiraq, Saddam's forces might have been equipped with atomic warheads in 1991."

In 2010, squad leader Ze'ev Raz said of the operation: "There was no doubt in the mind of the decision makers that we couldn't take a chance. We knew that the Iraqis could do exactly what we did in Dimona."

As early as the autumn of 1981, Kenneth Waltz discussed the fallout from the strike:

In striking Iraq, Israel showed that a preventive strike can be made, something that was not in doubt. Israel's act and its consequences however, make clear that the likelihood of useful accomplishment is low. Israel's strike increased the determination of Arabs to produce nuclear weapons. Arab states that may attempt to do so will now be all the more secretive and circumspect. Israel's strike, far from foreclosing Iraq's nuclear future, gained her the support of some other Arab states in pursuing it. And despite Prime Minister Begin's vow to strike as often as need be, the risks in doing so would rise with each occasion.

In 1991, David Ivry, who had been the commander of the Israeli Air Force at the time of the raid, received a photograph of the destroyed reactor from US Defense Secretary Dick Cheney with the message "For Gen. David Ivry, with thanks and appreciation for the outstanding job he did on the Iraqi nuclear program in 1981 -- which made our job much easier in Desert Storm."

Charles R. H. Tripp, in an interview for the 25th anniversary of the attack, described the bombing of Osirak as a variation of Israeli military doctrine beginning with the premiership of David Ben-Gurion, "advocating devastating pre-emptive strikes on Arab enemies." Tripp asserted, "the Osirak attack is an illegal way to behave—Resolution 487 established that—but it is an understandable way to behave if you are the Israeli military-security establishment."

Following the U.S.-led invasion of Iraq in 2003, American forces captured a number of documents detailing conversations that Saddam Hussein had with his inner sanctum. In a 1982 conversation Hussein stated that, "Once Iraq walks out victorious [over Iran], there will not be any Israel." Of Israel's anti-Iraqi endeavors, Saddam noted, "Technically, they [the Israelis] are right in all of their attempts to harm Iraq."

Tom Moriarty, a military intelligence analyst for the United States Air Force, wrote in 2004 that Israel had "gambled that the strike would be within Iraq's threshold of tolerance." Moriarty argues that Iraq, already in the midst of a war with Iran, would not start a war with Israel at the same time and that its "threshold of tolerance was higher than normal."

Joseph Cirincione, then director of non-proliferation at the Carnegie Endowment for International Peace, wrote in 2006:

Israel had pulled off a remarkable military raid, striking targets with great precision over long distances. But the bombing set back Israel more than Iraq. It further harmed Israel's international reputation, later worsened by the ill-fated 1982 invasion of Lebanon, while making Iraq appear a victim of Israeli aggression.

By contrast, Iraqi researchers have stated that the Iraqi nuclear program simply went underground, diversified, and expanded. Khidir Hamza, an Iraqi nuclear scientist, made the following statement in an interview on CNN's Crossfire in 2003:

Israel—actually, what Israel [did] is that it got out the immediate danger out of the way. But it created a much larger danger in the longer range. What happened is that Saddam ordered us—we were 400 ... scientists and technologists running the program. And when they bombed that reactor out, we had also invested $400 million. And the French reactor and the associated plans were from Italy. When they bombed it out we became 7,000 with a $10 billion investment for a secret, much larger underground program to make bomb material by enriching uranium. We dropped the reactor out totally, which was the plutonium for making nuclear weapons, and went directly into enriching uranium. ... They [Israel] estimated we'd make 7 kg [15 lb] of plutonium a year, which is enough for one bomb. And they get scared and bombed it out. Actually it was much less than this, and it would have taken a much longer time. But the program we built later in secret would make six bombs a year.

Similarly, the Iraqi nuclear scientist Imad Khadduri wrote in 2003 that the bombing of Osirak convinced the Iraqi leadership to initiate a full-fledged nuclear weapons program. United States Secretary of Defense William Perry stated in 1997 that Iraq refocused its nuclear weapons effort on producing highly enriched uranium after the raid. Its interest in acquiring plutonium as fissile material for weapons continued, but at a lower priority.

In the Duelfer Report, released by the Iraq Survey Group in 2004, it is stated that the Iraqi nuclear program "expanded considerably" with the purchase of the French reactor in 1976, and that "Israel's bombing of Iraq's Osirak nuclear reactor spurred Saddam to build up Iraq's military to confront Israel in the early 1980s."

Bob Woodward, in the book State of Denial, writes:

Israeli intelligence were convinced that their strike in 1981 on the Osirak nuclear reactor about 10 miles (16 km) outside Baghdad had ended Saddam's program. Instead [it initiated] covert funding for a nuclear program code-named 'PC3' involving 5,000 people testing and building ingredients for a nuclear bomb.

Richard K. Betts wrote that "there is no evidence that Israel's destruction of Osirak delayed Iraq's nuclear weapons program. The attack may actually have accelerated it." Dan Reiter has repeatedly said that the attack was a dangerous failure: the bombed reactor had nothing to do with weapons research, while "the attack may have actually increased Saddam's commitment to acquiring weapons." In 2011, and basing herself on new Iraqi sources, Malfrid Braut-Hegghammer said that the attack: "...triggered a covert nuclear weapons program that did not previously exist ... a decade later Iraq stood on the threshold of a nuclear weapons capability. This case suggests that preventive attacks can increase the long-term proliferation risk posed by the targeted state." Elsewhere, she wrote:

The destruction of the Osiraq reactor did not delay the development of a nuclear weapons option because it [the reactor] was never intended to be part of such an effort. The French-supplied facility was subject to rigorous safeguards and designed to ensure that Iraq would not be able to produce weapons-grade plutonium. An examination of the reactor by Harvard physicist Richard Wilson after the attack concluded that the facility was not suited for production of weapons-grade plutonium. As a result, the attack did not reduce the risk that Iraq would develop nuclear weapons. On the contrary, it brought about a far more determined and focused effort to acquire nuclear weapons.

Following Desert Storm, Dick Cheney, then the United States Secretary of Defense, thanked the Israeli mission commander for the "outstanding job he did on the Iraqi nuclear program in 1981". While many scholars debate the value of the bombing, Iraq did not possess nuclear weapons at the outbreak of the Gulf War, and, according to Cheney, the bombing made Desert Storm easier.

The second use of the Begin Doctrine was Operation Orchard in 2007, an Israeli airstrike on a purported Syrian nuclear target. Like in Operation Opera, the same types of aircraft were involved, although their roles were reversed with the F-15Is carrying bombs while the F-16Is provided escort.

== See also ==
- France–Iraq relations
- French support for Iraq during the Iran–Iraq War
- Iraq–Israel relations
- Nuclear weapons of Israel
- Operation Entebbe
- Operation Gift
- Operation Orchard – a 2007 Israeli airstrike on a purported Syrian nuclear target
- Operation Wooden Leg – the Israeli Air Force's raid on Tunisia
- Stuxnet
- Tchach-Tchachim Speech

== Bibliography ==
- Amos Perlmutter, Michael I. Handel, Uri Bar-Joseph, Two Minutes Over Baghdad, ISBN 978-0-7146-8347-8
- Geoff Simons, Iraq: From Sumer to Saddam, ISBN 978-1-4039-1770-6
- Gary D. Solis, The Law of Armed Conflict: International Humanitarian Law in War, ISBN 978-0-521-87088-7
- United Nations Staff, Yearbook of the United Nations 1981, ISBN 978-0-8002-3756-1
- The 1982 World Book Year Book, ISBN 978-0-7166-0482-2
- Anthony Cordesman, Iraq and the War of Sanctions: Conventional Threats and Weapons of Mass Destruction, ISBN 978-0-275-96528-0
- Bennett Ramberg, Nuclear Power Plants as Weapons for the Enemy: An Unrecognized Military Peril, ISBN 978-0-520-04969-7
- Sasha Polakow-Suransky, The Unspoken Alliance: Israel's Secret Relationship with Apartheid South Africa, ISBN 978-0-375-42546-2
- Trita Parsi, Treacherous Alliance: The Secret Dealings of Israel, Iran, and the United States, ISBN 978-0-300-12057-8
- Israel Stockman-Shomron, Israel, the Middle East and the Great Powers, ISBN 978-965-287-000-1
- Henry Shue, David Rhodin, Preemption: Military Action and Moral Justification, ISBN 978-0-19-923313-7
- Elaine Sciolino, The Outlaw State: Saddam Hussein's Quest for Power and the War in the Gulf, ISBN 978-0-471-54299-5
- Shirley V. Scott, Anthony Billingsley, Christopher Michaelsen, International Law and the Use of Force: A Documentary and Reference Guide, ISBN 978-0-313-36259-0
- Dan Perry, Israel and the Quest for Permanence, ISBN 978-0-7864-0645-6
- Shlomo Aloni, Israeli F-15 Eagle Units in Combat, ISBN 978-1-84603-047-5
- Fred Holroyd, Thinking about nuclear weapons: analyses and prescriptions, ISBN 978-0-7099-3775-3
- Richard C. Ragaini, International Seminar on Nuclear War and Planetary Emergencies: 29th session, ISBN 978-981-238-586-4
- David Styan, France and Iraq: Oil, Arms and French Policy Making in the Middle East, ISBN 978-1-84511-045-1
- Leonard Spector, Proliferation Today, ISBN 978-0-394-72901-5
- Dan McKinnon, Bullseye Iraq, ISBN 978-0-425-11259-5
- Patrick Seale, Asad: The Struggle for the Middle East, ISBN 978-0-520-06976-3
- Allan D. Abbey, Journey of Hope: The Story of Ilan Ramon, Israel's First Astronaut, ISBN 978-965-229-316-9
- Trevor Dupuy, Paul Martell, Flawed Victory: Arab-Israeli Conflict and the 1982 War in Lebanon, ISBN 978-0-915979-07-3
- Ofira Seliktar, Divided We Stand: American Jews, Israel, and the Peace Process, ISBN 978-0-275-97408-4
- Peter A. Clausen, Nonproliferation and the National Interest: America's Response to the Spread of Nuclear Weapons, ISBN 978-0-06-501395-5
- David Krieger, The challenge of abolishing nuclear weapons, ISBN 978-1-4128-1036-4
- Seymour Hersh, The Samson Option: Israel's Nuclear Arsenal and American Foreign Policy, ISBN 978-0-679-74331-6
- Jackson Nyamuya Maogoto, Battling Terrorism: Legal Perspectives on the Use of Force and the War on Terror, ISBN 978-0-7546-4407-1
- H. H. A. Cooper, Terrorism and espionage in the Middle East: deception, displacement and denial, ISBN 978-0-7734-5866-6
- Barry Leonard, Technology Transfer to the Middle East Archived 20 July 2011 at the Wayback Machine,
- Sharad S. Chauhan, War on Iraq, ISBN 978-81-7648-478-7
- Bob Woodward, State of Denial: Bush at War, Part III, ISBN 978-0-7432-7223-0
- Imad Khadduri, Iraq's Nuclear Mirage, Memoirs and Delusions, ISBN 978-0-9733790-0-6
- Karl P. Mueller, Striking First: Preemptive and Preventive Attack in U.S. National Security Policy, ISBN 978-0-8330-3881-4
- Shai Feldman, Nuclear Weapons and Arms Control in the Middle East, ISBN 978-0-262-56108-2
