= Israeli bases in Iraq =

Clandestine military presence

- Part of the 2026 Iran war and Middle Eastern crisis (2023–present)
- Operational scope: Clandestinely support Israeli attacks on Iran in 2025 and 2026
- Location: Al Anbar Governorate, Iraq; 32.041111°N 42.254722°E
- Date: Late 2024 – May 2026
- Executed by: Israel Defense Forces
- Casualties: 1 Iraqi soldier killed 2 Iraqi soldiers injured 1 Iraqi civilian killed
- Location of the first base; the location of the second base is currently unknown

In 2026, it was revealed by The Wall Street Journal and The New York Times and later confirmed by Iraqi officials that Israel had maintained a discreet military presence in Iraq consisting of two clandestine military outposts or bases in the western desert to support its air campaigns and wars against Iran. The bases included the capacity for search-and-rescue teams to assist downed Israeli pilots. Planning for the two bases began in late 2024; they were used to bolster Israeli attacks on Iran during the Twelve-Day War in 2025 and 2026 Iran war.

== History ==
The Israel Defense Forces began constructing the first makeshift base in Iraq as far back as late 2024 amid the 2024 Iran–Israel conflict. On 9 May 2026, The Wall Street Journal reported the first base's existence in the Nukhayb desert in Al Anbar Governorate; it is no longer operational. On 17 May 2026, The New York Times revealed that Israel had set up a second base in Iraq's western desert, which operated for over a year and was used in the Twelve-Day War in June 2025.

According to The Wall Street Journal, the base housed special forces from the Israeli Air Force and provided logistical support. Israel prevented the discovery of its makeshift bases in Iraq, killing Bedouin shepherd Awwad al-Shammari who discovered the base on 3 March 2026. On 4 March, the Iraqi Armed Forces dispatched a force of three regiments from the Karbala Operations Command to the area but came under Israeli fire, resulting in one Iraqi soldier killed, and two injured. The detachment withdrew. Israeli forces conducted airstrikes to repel the approach.

The United States was reportedly aware of the makeshift bases since at least June 2025, but likely withheld the information from the Iraqi government, despite official protocol requiring the U.S. to inform Iraq of any activities on Iraqi territory. Iraq was compelled to shut down its radar to protect U.S. aircraft.
