= Tammuz (Babylonian calendar) =

Tammuz was a month in the Babylonian calendar, named for one of the main Babylonian gods, Tammuz (Sumerian: Dumuzid, "son of life"). Many different calendar systems have since adopted Tammuz to refer to a month in the summer season.

In the Hebrew calendar, Tammuz is the tenth month of the civil year and the fourth month of the ecclesiastical year on the Hebrew calendar. It is a summer month of 29 days. Tammuz is also the name for the month of July in the Gregorian calendar in Arabic (تموز), Syriac (ܬܡܘܙ) and Turkish (Temmuz).

== History ==
The festival for the deity Tammuz was held throughout the month of Tammuz in midsummer, and celebrated his death and resurrection. The first day of the month of Tammuz was the day of the new moon of the summer solstice. On the second day of the month, there was lamentation over the death of Tammuz, on the 9th, 16th and 17th days torchlit processions, and on the last three days, an image of Tammuz was buried.

=== In Arabic sources ===
Tammuz is the month of July in Arabic, and references to the month of Tammuz, its history, and celebratory rites with which it is associated are discussed in Arabic literature from the 9th to 11th centuries AD. In his translation of an earlier work, Ibn Wahshiyya (c. 9th-10th century AD), enumerates the months of the Babylonian year adding a remark that Tammuz lived in Babylonia before the coming of the Chaldeans and belonged to an ancient Mesopotamian tribe called Ganbân. He further adds that the Sabians in Harran and Babylonia still lamented the loss of Tammuz every July, but that the origin of the worship had been lost. Al-Nadim in his 10th century work Kitab al-Fehrest drawing from a work on Syriac calendar feast days, describes a Tâ'ûz festival that took place in the middle of the month of Tammuz. Women bewailed the death of Tammuz at the hands of his master who was said to have "ground his bones in a mill and scattered them to the wind." Consequently, women would forgo the eating of ground foods during the festival time. The same festival is mentioned in the 11th century by Ibn Athir as still taking place in the month of Tammuz on the banks of the Tigris river.

Ma'ruf al-Rusafi (1875–1945), a leading Iraqi poet, wrote a poem entitled Tammuz al-Hurriyya ("July, the month of freedom") to celebrate the Young Turk Revolution of 1908 and the deposition of 'Abd al-Hamid, the last Ottoman sultan. The 1958 revolution in Iraq took place on the 14th of July. The 1968 Ba'ath revolution in Iraq took place in the month of Tammuz, and the Osirak nuclear reactor built by Saddam Hussein in 1977 and destroyed by Israel in 1981 was known domestically as Tammuz, a reference to the month of July when temperatures in Iraq reach their highest levels and it is unbearably hot.

The 2006 Lebanon War is known in Lebanon and much of the Arab world as حرب تموز (Ḥarb Tammūz 'the July War'), following the Arab custom of naming the Arab-Israeli wars by months or years.

== Bibliography ==
- Bromiley, Geoffrey W. (1995), International Standard Bible Encyclopedia: Q-Z (Reprint, revised ed.), Wm. B. Eerdmans Publishing, ISBN 9780802837844
- Cragg, Kenneth (1991), The Arab Christian: A History in the Middle East, Westminster John Knox Press, ISBN 9780664221829
- Fuller, John Mee (1864), Essay on the Authenticity of the Book of Daniel, Deighton, Bell and co.
- Genequand, Charles (1986), Ibn Rushd's Metaphysics: a translation with introduction of Ibn Rushd's commentary on Aristotle's metaphysics, book Lām (Reprint ed.), BRILL, ISBN 978-90-04-08093-5
- Hastings, James (2004), A Dictionary of the Bible: Volume IV: (Part II: Shimrath -- Zuzim) (Illustrated ed.), The Minerva Group, Inc., ISBN 978-1-4102-1729-5
- Kitto, John, ed. (1846), A Cyclopaedia of Biblical Literature: Ibz-Zuz, vol. 2, Mark H. Newman
- Obeidi, Mahdi; Pitzer, Kurt (2004), The Bomb in My Garden: The Secrets of Saddam's Nuclear Mastermind, John Wiley and Sons, ISBN 978-0-471-67965-3
