= Tuwaitha Nuclear Research Center =

Nuclear facility site near Baghdad, Iraq

Coordinates: 33°12′18″N 44°30′54″E

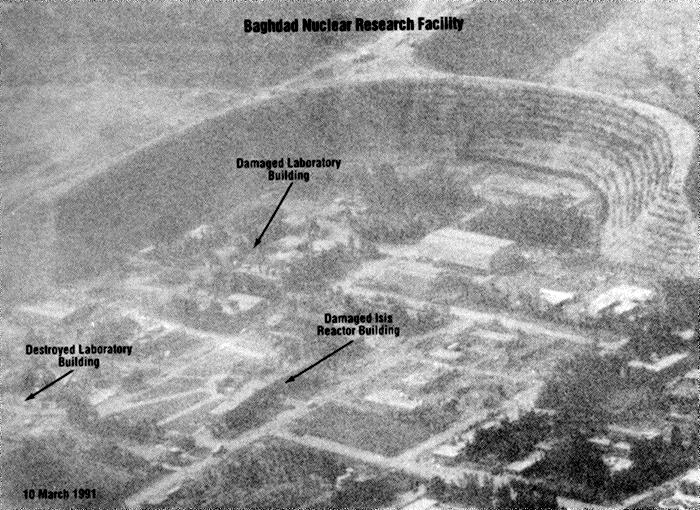
Baghdad Nuclear Research Facility - 10 March 1991. The Tuwaitha Nuclear Research Facility, Baghdad, Post-strike.

The Baghdad Nuclear Research Facility adjacent to the Tuwaitha "Yellow Cake Factory" or Tuwaitha Nuclear Research Center contains the remains of Iraqi nuclear reactors bombed by Iran in 1980, Israel in 1981, and the United States in 1991. It was used as a storage facility for spent reactor fuel and industrial and medical waste. The radioactive material would not be useful for a fission bomb, but could be used in a dirty bomb. Following the 2003 invasion of Iraq, the facility was heavily looted by hundreds of Iraqis, though it is unclear what was taken.

== History ==
The Tuwaitha Nuclear Research Center was the main nuclear site in Iraq that was involved with handling nuclear material. It was started in 1967 when three main nuclear facilities and waste location were put in operation. These were the IRT 2000 research reactor, the radioisotope production building and the dumping station (waste store). Many other nuclear facilities were subsequently constructed at this site, and the IRT 2000 reactor was also upgraded to IRT 5000.

Until 1991, the facility was a nuclear research facility supposedly under the direction of Khidir Hamza. The facility is surrounded by a sand berm four miles (6.4 km) around and 160 feet (50 m) high, and contained the French-built research reactor Osirak, destroyed by Israel in 1981. Israel contended that there was a secret underground compartment for the production of plutonium. Plutonium is produced in breeder reactors by surrounding a neutron source, such as a nuclear reactor, with a 'blanket' of U-238. The neutrons released by nuclear fission are donated, producing Pu-239 and is the cheapest and easiest way to achieve large-scale production of plutonium. The director of the IAEA, which conducted regular inspections of the complex, argued that a secret vault 40 meters below the reactor core would not be very effective, to which Israel responded by correcting their original statement to 4 meters. The IAEA was aware of such a vault but the reactor floor was shielded and the vault contained the mechanisms for raising the control rods which require access for maintenance. According to the Director of the IAEA, the shielding would block the neutrons needed to turn U-238 into Pu-239 and the reactor would not be able to operate if the vault was blocked by being filled with uranium.

As the sole reactor site in Iraq, the reactors relied on fuel imported from France and was unable to produce significant quantities of enriched uranium. In 1991, If Iraq had converted their entire stockpile of nuclear fuel rods, assuming they were able to perform the extremely difficult task of separation from highly irradiated fuel which contained 69 elements, they would only have 41 kg of U-235, less than the 64 kg used in Little Boy. 52 kg of 93% enriched uranium is the minimum critical mass required to create a uranium bomb. They did not have the technical capabilities or resources to produce an implosion type device that uses less U-235 but requires complex lenses and initiators.

During the initial months of the occupation, Tuwaitha was protected by American forces and administered by contractors from the Raytheon Corporation. Complete control of the facility was turned over to Iraqi authorities in the Summer of 2004. During American occupation the complex was looted, mostly for scrap lead. Lead-lined barrels and containers were emptied on-site then taken to a nearby improvised lead foundry then smelted into ingots. The operation was conducted in two parts. The first was a highly orchestrated event requiring industrial machinery in which large pieces of shielding from the destroyed reactors was stolen. The second involved local villagers carrying items on hand-carts. At most 10 kg of uranium was lost in what could easily be explained as minor contamination by a few grams of dust per vessel of the more than 200 containers stolen.

== Research achievements ==
Research conducted at the complex produced novel results necessary to establish a self-sufficient nuclear program.

- The IRT-5000 was used as an extremely limited breeder reactor using 3 Iraqi manufactured natural uranium rods and a 10% enriched rod and reprocessed with the permission of the IAEA. Using PUREX based technology, Project 22 produced 5 grams of plutonium.
- 7.6% enrichment using EMIS (magnetic separation) technology, producing a total of 640g from 1985 to 1991.
- Experimenting with the Japanese Asahi Kasei technique, produced 100 kg of polyvinyl, phenylpyridine-based, macroreticular anion exchange resin over a 2-year period.

Gas centrifuge, laser isotopic separation and gas diffusion technology were investigated but abandoned due to the Iraqi economy lacking the industrial infrastructure to support such an effort. Although the Iraqi government was able to smuggle some steel and carbon-fiber centrifuge units into the country, they needed at least a thousand to process industrial quantities. Without wide availability of extremely high precision instrumentation and production facilities, the task was impossible under anti-proliferation embargoes. Russia and the U.S.A. only developed the high-precision machining technology required during the space race.

== Present status ==
The 18 facilities and radwaste locations on this site and included within the decommissioning project are as follows:

- Radiochemistry Laboratory
- IRT 5000 Reactor
- Italian Radioisotope Production (Isotope Production No 2)
- Russian Radioisotope Production (Isotope Production No 1)
- LAMA
- Tamuz 2 Reactor
- Radioactive Waste Treatment Station (RWTS)
- Solid Waste Storage Silo (French)
- RWTS Warehouse/ Waste Store
- Contaminated ground and material surrounding RWTS Building
- Russian Waste Storage Silos
- Uranium Metal Production
- Fuel Fabrication and U Purification (including Waste Pit)
- Fuel Element Thermal Test Facility (Other Italian Complex)
- Technology Hall (Uranium Tetrachloride Preparation and Purification Labs)
- Po 210 Production
- OUT-1 Burial/Concealment Location
- Scrap yards and Burial Sites

== See also ==
- Iraq and weapons of mass destruction

== External links and references ==
- Iraqi Nuclear Site Is Found Looted: U.S. Team Unable to Determine Whether Deadly Materials Are Missing, Washington Post, 4 May 2003
- The IAEA IN Iraq - Past Activities and Findings. IAEA Bulletin. 44/2/2002, Garry B. Dillon - Verified nuclear materials. 500 tons natural uranium, 1.8 tons partially enriched, and 300 tons of medical radioactive materials.
- Mohamed ElBaradei: Iraq should get one final chance?
- IAEA Tuwaitha general documents
- http://www-ns.iaea.org/projects/iraq/tuwaitha.asp?s=8&l=66
- http://www.globalsecurity.org/wmd/world/iraq/tuwaitha.htm
