= List of Hebrew University of Jerusalem people =

The list of Hebrew University of Jerusalem alumni includes notable graduates, professors, and administrators affiliated with the Hebrew University of Jerusalem.

Four of Israel's prime ministers graduates from the Hebrew University of Jerusalem: Ehud Barak, Ariel Sharon, Ehud Olmert and Naftali Bennett.

15 Nobel Prize winners, two Fields Medalists and three Turing Award winners have been affiliated with the university as alumni, researchers or faculty.

== Notable alumni ==
=== Major award laureates ===
- Fields Medal laureate: Elon Lindenstrauss (2010)
- Nobel Prize laureates: Daniel Kahneman (economics 2002), David Gross (physics 2004), Avram Hershko (chemistry 2004), Aaron Ciechanover (chemistry 2004), Robert Aumann (economics 2005), Roger D. Kornberg (chemistry 2006), and Ada Yonath (chemistry 2009)
- Turing Award laureates: Michael O. Rabin (1976), Richard E. Stearns (1993), Shafi Goldwasser (2012)

=== Political leaders ===
- Ambassador Yael Rubinstein
- Members of the Knesset: Colette Avital, Yael Dayan, Taleb el-Sana, Dalia Itzik, Roman Bronfman, David Rotem, Ahmed Tibi, Avigdor Lieberman, Dov Khenin, Danny Danon, Shulamit Aloni, Rachel Adato, Ze'ev Elkin, Roni Bar-On, Ze'ev Bielski, Yohanan Plesner, Yuval Steinitz, Dan Meridor, Yisrael Katz, Jamal Zahalka, Shai Hermesh, Zvulun Orlev, Menachem Ben-Sasson, Ya'akov Ne'eman, Geulah Cohen, Bechor-Shalom Sheetrit, Orit Farkash-Hacohen
- Jerusalem city council members: Ofer Berkovitch
- Presidents of Israel: Ephraim Katzir, Yitzhak Navon, Moshe Katsav, Reuven Rivlin
- Prime Ministers of Israel: Ehud Barak, Ariel Sharon, Ehud Olmert, Naftali Bennett
- Supreme Court Justices: Aharon Barak, Dorit Beinisch, Menachem Elon, Elyakim Rubinstein, Meir Shamgar, Jacob Turkel, Yitzhak Zamir, Salim Joubran, Uri Shoham
- President of Guatemala: Bernardo Arévalo

=== By profession ===
- Academics: Emanuel Adler, Michael Albeck, Raphael Amit, Yoram Ben-Porat, Ahron Bregman, Richard I. Cohen, Uri Davis, Amitai Etzioni, Esther Farbstein, Gerson Goldhaber, Daphna Hacker, Haim Harari, Jose Itzigsohn, Joshua Jortner, Efraim Karsh, Asa Kasher, Walter Laqueur, Alexander Levitzki, Saul Lieberman, Avishai Margalit, Jacob (Kobi) Metzer, Dianne Neumark-Sztainer, Dana Olmert, Neri Oxman, Dana Pe'er, Uriel Reichman, Joshua Ronen, Miri Rubin, Ariel Rubinstein, Eli Salzberger, Amit Schejter, Michael Sela, Igal Talmi, Benjamin Elazari Volcani, Menahem Yaari, Reuven Avi-Yonah, Ada Yonath
- Activists: Hamze Awawde, Dorit Reiss, Elie Yossef
- Anthropologist: Eliane Karp
- Archaeologists: Ruth Amiran, Trude Dothan, Aren Maeir, Amihai Mazar, Benjamin Mazar, Eilat Mazar, Yigael Yadin
- Astronomers: David H. Levy
- Biology and biochemistry: Naomi Chayen, Danny Ionescu, Sarah Spiegel (1974)
- Botanists: Daniel Chamovitz, Alexander Eig
- Business: Kobi Alexander (former CEO and founder of Comverse Technology), Léo Apotheker (former CEO of Hewlett-Packard and SAP), Dina Dublon (board member of Microsoft, Accenture and PepsiCo), Maxine Fassberg (former CEO of Intel Israel), Orit Gadiesh (Chairman of Bain & Company), Eli Hurvitz (CEO 1976–2002 Teva Pharmaceuticals), Gil Shwed (CEO and chairman Check Point Software Technologies), Jonathan Kestenbaum, Baron Kestenbaum, chief operating officer of investment trust RIT Capital Partners, and a Labour member of the House of Lords
- Chemists: Yitzhak Apeloig, Adam Heller, Dan Meyerstein, Moshe Ron, Renata Reisfeld
- Climatologists: Amaelle Landais-Israël
- Educators: Brother Rafael S. Donato FSC, Ed.D., was a Filipino De La Salle Brother and was the past President of De La Salle University Manila, University of St. La Salle, De La Salle Lipa, La Salle Green Hills and De La Salle Araneta University.
- Film, theatre, show business: Joseph Cedar, Maya Arad Yasur, Uri Zohar
- Foreign service: Naomi Ben-Ami, Gabriela Shalev, Rafael Harpaz, Zion Evrony
- Journalists: Khaled Abu Toameh, Ron Ben-Yishai, Nahum Barnea, Boaz Evron, Amos Kenan, Sayed Kashua, Amira Hass, Akiva Eldar, Yossi Melman, Meron Benvenisti, Tom Segev, Haviv Rettig, Dan Margalit, Ya'akov Ahimeir, Michael Bar-Zohar, David Witzthum, Haim Gouri, Ehud Yaari, Zvi Yehezkeli
- Historians: Esther Farbstein, Yuval Noah Harari, Itamar Rabinovich, Ron Robin, Semion Goldin
- Law
  - Judges: Elisheva Barak-Ussoskin
  - Lawyers: Yoram Dinstein, Meir Shmuel Gabay, Elias Khoury, Menachem Mazuz, Ya'akov Ne'eman, Itzhak Nener, Malcolm Shaw, Joseph Raz
  - Law professor: Dorit Reiss
- Linguists: Kazuo Ueda
- Mathematicians: Rami Grossberg (1986), Joram Lindenstrauss (1962), Moshe Machover (1962), Menachem Magidor, Amnon Pazy, Oded Schramm (1987), Saharon Shelah (1969)
- Physicists: Amikam Aharoni, David Gross, Haim Harari, Max Jammer, Igal Talmi, Micha Tomkiewicz
- Psychologists: Shlomo Breznitz, Asher Cohen, Esther Perel
- Religion
  - Rabbis: Jonathan Markovitch, Mario Rojzman
  - Clergy: Malcolm Ranjith, Archbishop of the Roman Catholic Archdiocese of Colombo, 2nd Sri Lankan to be made a cardinal, Patriarch Theophilos III of Jerusalem
  - Theologians: Fr Malachi Martin, Yigal Arnon
- Soldiers: Yishai Beer, Uzi Dayan, Yuval Neria, Yonatan "Yoni" Netanyahu, Hans Ludwig Striem
- Sports: Itzik Kornfein, Shaul Ladany, Adin Talbar, Yochanan Vollach
- Writers: Yehuda Amichai, Galila Ron-Feder Amit, Aharon Appelfeld, Netiva Ben-Yehuda, Elias Chacour, Yael Dayan, Yuval Elizur, Helen Epstein, Jonah Frankel, David Grossman, Dmitry Glukhovsky, Batya Gur, Shifra Horn, Amos Oz, A. B. Yehoshua, Amnon Jackont, Amalia Kahana-Carmon, Yehoshua Kenaz, Miriam Roth, Amir Segal, Anton Shammas, Gideon Telpaz, Natan Yonatan

== Notable faculty, past and present ==
- Dorit Aharonov, computer science
- Joshua David Angrist, economist, 2021 Nobel Prize laureate for Economics
- Lydia Aran, scholar of Buddhism
- Robert Aumann, 2005 Nobel Prize laureate for Economics
- Shlomo Avineri, Political Science
- Yishai Bar, law
- Yehoshua Bar-Hillel, linguistics
- Yaacov Bar-Siman-Tov, international relations
- Aharon Barak, former President of the Israeli Supreme Court
- Yehuda Bauer, Holocaust history
- Jacob Bekenstein, physics
- Mara Beller, (1945–2004) history and philosophy of science
- Norman Bentwich, international relations
- Nissim Benvenisty, genetics, the Herbert Cohn Chair in Cancer Research, and Director of the Azrieli Center for Stem Cells and Genetic Research, Alexander Silberman Institute of Life Sciences
- Ernst David Bergmann, chairman of Israeli Atomic Energy Commission
- Martin Buber, religion & Jewish philosophy
- Howard Cedar, chairperson, Developmental Biology & Cancer Research, IMRIC
- Ilan Chet, agricultural biotechnology
- Richard I. Cohen, history
- Avishai Dekel Andre Aisenstadt Chair of Theoretical Physics
- Shmuel Eisenstadt, sociology
- Menachem Elon, former deputy president of the Israeli Supreme Court
- Ruth Fine, Spanish
- Adolf Abraham Halevi Fraenkel, mathematics
- Assaf Friedler, organic chemist
- Hillel Furstenberg, mathematics, Israel Prize winner
- Leah Goldberg (1911–1970), poet
- Eliezer E. Goldschmidt, agriculture
- Asher Dan Grunis, Supreme Court Justice
- Louis Guttman, social sciences and statistics
- Naomi Habib, computational neuroscientist
- Ephraim Halevy, Mossad chief
- Lumír Ondřej Hanuš, analytic chemist
- Yuval Noah Harari, history
- Gabriel Herman, Historian
- Gabriel Horenczyk, psychologist, faculty member of the Melton Centre for Jewish Education and the School of Education.
- Daniel Kahneman, 2002 Nobel Prize laureate for Economics
- Ruth Kark, geography of (Eretz) Israel
- Elihu Katz, communication
- Aharon Katzir, chemistry
- David Kazhdan, mathematics
- Baruch Kimmerling, sociology
- Roger D. Kornberg, visiting professor, 2006 Nobel Prize laureate for chemistry
- David Kretzmer, law
- Ruth Lapidoth, law
- Ruth Lawrence, mathematics
- Hava Lazarus-Yafeh (1930–1998), Orientalist, head of the Department for Islamic Civilization, Israel Prize winner
- Yeshayahu Leibowitz, biochemistry and Jewish philosophy
- Raphael D. Levine, chemist
- Avigdor Levontin, law
- Nehemia Levtzion (1935–2003), scholar of African history, Near East, Islamic, and African studies, President of the Open University of Israel, and executive director of the Van Leer Jerusalem Institute
- Amia Lieblich, psychology
- Elon Lindenstrauss, mathematics, laureate of the 2010 Fields Medal
- Joram Lindenstrauss, mathematics, Israel Prize winner
- Avishai Margalit, philosophy Israel Prize winner
- Amihai Mazar, archaeology, Israel Prize winner
- Benjamin Mazar. archaeologist, Israel Prize winner, former university president and rector
- Jacob (Kobi) Metzer, economic historian, professor, and the eighth president of the Open University of Israel
- Eugen Mittwoch, semitic languages, guest professor in 1924 (famous as head of German Nachrichtenstelle in World War I)
- George Mosse, history
- Bezalel Narkiss, art history
- Amnon Netzer, Jewish studies and history
- Ehud Netzer (1934–2010), archaeology
- Yaakov Nahmias, bioengineering
- Anat Ninio, psychology
- Mordechai Nisan, education
- Dan Pagis, literature
- Amos Panet, virology
- Nurit Peled-Elhanan, education
- Tsvi Piran, astrophysics
- Joshua Prawer, history
- Michael O. Rabin, computer science and mathematics, Israel Prize winner and recipient of the Turing Award.
- Giulio Racah, physics
- Frances Raday, law
- Aharon Razin, Researcher, IMRIC
- Eliyahu Rips, mathematics
- Mordechai Rotenberg, social work
- Gershom Scholem, Jewish mysticism
- Eliezer Schweid, Jewish philosophy
- Ehud de Shalit, number theorist
- Zlil Sela, mathematics
- Nir Shaviv, astrophysics
- Saharon Shelah, mathematics
- Avigdor Shinan, Hebrew literature
- Avraham Steinberg, medical ethics
- Zeev Sternhell, political science
- Hayim Tadmor, Assyriology
- Jacob Talmon, history
- Gadi Taub, social sciences
- Amos Tversky, psychology
- Claude Vigée, French literature
- Marta Weinstock-Rosin, neuropharmacology, Israel Prize winner
- Avi Wigderson, computer science and mathematics
- Joseph Yahalom, Hebrew poetry
- S. Yizhar, writer

== Bibliography ==
- "איתור בוגרים – מאגר רשמי של האוניברסיטה העברית" (in Hebrew). האוניברסיטה העברית בירושלים.
