= Beseter Ra'am =

Beseter Ra'am (Hebrew: בסתר רעם; a biblical reference; variously translated) may refer to:

- Beseter Ra'am (In the Secret Place of Thunder, Hidden in Thunder, 1886-1887) by Mendele Mocher Sforim
- Hidden in Thunder, a book by Esther Farbstein, discusses religious and halakhic issues which affected the lives of observant Jews during the Holocaust.
