= Moshe Edri =

Moshe Edri (Hebrew: משה אדרי) may refer to:

- Moshe Edri (general), Israeli retired general, head of the Israel Atomic Energy Commission
- Moshe Edri (filmmaker), Israeli filmmaker
- Moshe Edri (police officer), Israeli retired police officer, Director General of Knesset
