= Sarah Spiegel =

Sarah Spiegel may refer to:

- Sarah Spiegel (biologist)
- Sarah Spiegel (singer)
