= Women Lawyers for Social Justice =

Non-profit, feminist, social justice organization

Itach Ma’aki – Women Lawyers for Social Justice
- Formation: 2001
- Type: Nonprofit, voluntary association
- Purpose: Feminist legal advocacy
- Headquarters: Tel Aviv
- Staff: 18 (2024)
- Website: http://www.itach.org.il/

Women Lawyers for Social Justice (in Hebrew: איתך – משפטניות למען צדק חברתי; in Arabic: إتاخ معكِ – حقوقيات من أجل العدالة الإجتماعية; known as "Itach Ma'aki") is a non-profit, voluntary association founded in 2001 in Israel. The organization was established by a group of women lawyers, with support from the New Israel Fund and Shatil, to give voice to women subject to social, geographic, national, ethnic and economic discrimination in Israeli society and inception of "groundbreaking feminist projects".

== Overview ==
Among the Association's activities are legal aid and representation to women in various areas of the law, including housing and employment; work to implement UN Security Council Resolution 1325; advocacy and lobbying on behalf of women at the governmental levels of the Knesset, High Court of Justice, government ministries, and municipalities; creation of new models for local government to implement gender mainstreaming, and any other issue in the public or private sphere involved with promoting justice and equality. As part of this goal, Itach Ma’aki emphasizes creation of multicultural gender discourse within diverse Israeli communities most subject to marginalization, including Palestinian, Haredi, Ethiopian-Israeli, and Russian-speaking communities.

The Association has branches in Tel Aviv, Beer Sheva and Haifa. Board members include legal scholars Netta Ziv (Hebrew), Daphna Hacker and Yofi Tirosh (Hebrew), attorneys Nasrin Aalimi Kabha and Rachel Benziman, journalist Anat Saragusti, political scholar Henriette Dahan Caleb. Major contributors include the New Israel Fund, which also transfers tax-free contributions from the United States, the Hadassa Women's Foundation, the Dafna Foundation, and the Levi Lausen Foundation.

Itach Ma'aki belongs to various coalitions and forums aligned with its ideology and purposes, including Women, Peace and Security - Resolution 1325, Forum of women's organisations and Forums for Young Women's NGO's.

== Activities ==
=== Legal advocacy ===
Itach Ma’aki acts in the areas of public housing, social security, collections, and other rights of women in low-wage employment, as well as issues of sexual harassment and sexual violence in the workplace. The Association provides legal advice, and represents women in legal cases, while also working to create policy change for various legal issues. A hotline is available for women to call regarding any legal issue they face.

In the public advocacy sphere, Itach Ma'aki joined a group of Israeli organizations in 2009, which approached the Attorney General to examine whether the IDF violated international law during the 2008-2009 Gaza War. Following the establishment of the Turkel Commission to investigate the 2010 flotilla to Gaza, Itach Ma'aki petitioned the High Court of Justice against the Government of Israel and the Turkel Commission due to the absence of women on the Government appointed Public Commission (HCJ 5660/10 Itach-Ma'aki v Prime Minister). The petition argued that the absence of women on the Commission dealing with such an important issue contravenes International Law and Section 6c1 of Israel's Women's Equal Rights Law; therefore, the High Court of Justice is required to intervene. The High Court ordered the Government to appoint a woman to the Commission, and the Court's ruling on this matter constitutes, still to date, one of the legal foundations for appropriate representation of women. The Association also asked to be allowed to submit to the committee a report from a gender perspective, so that the probe would include "the perspective of women peace activists, who are seeking to protest nonviolently, as well as the reality of women in Gaza, who are living under siege."

=== Center for Bedouin Women Rights ===
The center works to promote and ensure the rights of Bedouin women. It was established in Beer Sheva in 2006, when the many calls to the Association from this highly marginalized group made clear the urgent need for assistance. One of the main areas the center assists with is with Social Security rights, especially income guarantee stipends for single mothers and women in polygamous marriages. In addition, the center works on behalf of Bedouin women's rights through petitions to the High Court of Justice, attending Knesset conferences, and publishing reports and position papers in collaboration with other organizations in the Negev. In 2013, Itach Ma'aki published a groundbreaking report, which, for the first time, provides statistics on the extent of domestic violence against Bedouin women in the Negev. According to the report, 86% of the Bedouin women surveyed had suffered violence of some form. Among other findings, the report exposes how the lack of enforcement of the criminal prohibition on polygamy is one of the factors that increases violence.

=== School Teaching Assistants’ Rights ===
Itach Ma'aki represents the teaching assistants in their struggle for achieving comparable conditions and recognition within the education system. As part of this collaboration, begun in 2011, the National Alliance of Teaching Assistants (NATA) was established. NATA raises awareness of the struggle through conferences, media reports, position papers, and Knesset education committee discussions. NATA enlists the support and involvement of Knesset members from the entire political spectrum, as well as parents' organizations, in order to increase teaching assistant salaries, end summer dismissal of special-needs and medical-needs teaching assistants, add a second assistant in kindergartens, and create a dialogue with senior officials in the Ministry of Education and the Center for Local Government.

In 2011, the Association filed lawsuits on behalf of women working in non-officially recognized kindergartens within the Ultra-Orthodox community for equal employment terms as those of women working in official State recognized kindergartens. The Regional Labor Court ruled that equal terms of employment are mandatory. The significance of the ruling is that it compensated the women for the terms of their employment up until the date of the ruling and provided an opening for additional teaching assistants to demand comparable conditions.

=== City for All ===
The Association's City for All project is inspired by the model women's network established in Rishon LeZion, which aims to advance the status of women and promote gender equality locally. Through duplication and development of the model, the Association hopes to develop gender mainstreaming that will actually integrate women into decision-making processes in local authorities. As of 2019, the model is being implemented in the cities of Acre, Tayibe, and Haifa.

=== Women, Peace and Security – Resolution 1325 ===
UN Security Council Resolution 1325 of October 31, 2000, promotes diverse representation of women in decision-making positions, protection of women from violence, implementation of gender analysis and gender mainstreaming, and the prevention of conflict. This decision was adopted by the State of Israel and enshrined in the Women's Equality Law of 2005. Despite the adoption of the law, has not been practically implemented. Therefore, since 2007, the Association has been acting through petitions to the High Court of Justice, the establishment of conferences and seminars, and participation in committees in the Knesset, in order to implement and advance the resolution's commitments.

Inspired by many countries worldwide that have advocated comprehensive action plans to implement these principles, the Association, together with dozens of women's organizations, drafted a comprehensive plan of action. Two years later, the plan was launched at a convention and was presented to the Government, Knesset members and ambassadors from all over the world. In December 2014, following intensive efforts to advance the overall plan of action, the Israeli Government decided that the State will formulate a Governmental Action Plan. According to the Government's decision, the future plan will be based on global examples and the comprehensive plan of action drafted by the civil society.

=== “Choice” Activism Center for Jewish and Arab Women in Haifa ===
In 2015, the Association’s Haifa branch created “Choice” – the center of rights and activities on the ground for Arab and Jewish women. The purpose of the Center is to develop and strengthen activism among groups of Arab and Jewish women in the North, to raise awareness of socioeconomic rights, to protect women from violence, and to improve enforcement of their rights. The Center, staffed by lawyers and psychologists, runs a number of projects designed to achieve these goals. Center activities are based on extensive cooperation between civil society organizations in the North and various municipal authorities.

=== Nothing About Us – Without Us: Young Activists ===
Itach Ma'aki supports a national group of young women activists from various backgrounds who act to change policy on issues facing marginalized youth who lack support systems and services once they turn 18. The Association belongs to a collaborative group with the Women’s Courtyard and the Forum of Young Women’s NGOs. The group’s goal is to engender critical thinking for getting the issue onto the public agenda and changing the prevailing situation in which policy regarding young women is shaped without their participation and without their knowledge.

=== 2030 Agenda – Global Sustainable Development Goals ===
Together with the Heschel Center for Sustainability, Civic Leadership, and the Heinrich Bőll Foundation, Itach Ma'aki is working to promote the 2030 Agenda in Israel. Activities include the November 2018 milestone conference, attended by 120 civil society delegates and the issuing of the July 2019 Government Report, drafted by an inter-ministerial task force appointed by the Prime Minister, and which will be submitted to the United Nations.

=== Safety at Work for Women project ===
Deals with health and safety hazards that cleaning women and caregivers for the elderly are exposed to in their work, specifically the use of hazardous substances. This project involves a number of stages: mapping of needs, reviewing the existing situation and building a database, forming groups to empower women and train them for on-the-ground activities, and raising awareness among cleaning women and caregivers for the elderly.

=== Sexual Violence in the Health System project ===
This project arose as a result of women’s experiences in the institutional health system in Israel and of participants in the Legal Feminism Clinic run by Itach Ma'aki, recognizing the inherent difficulties and the complex balance of power present in the doctor-patient relationship. Through the Legal Feminism Clinic, the Association published a groundbreaking position paper on this subject. The project's goal is to raise awareness among patients and the public, and promote public policy to create an effective response system in the healthcare system to deal with complaints and provide treatment for women who experience sexual harm and abuse by caregivers.

== Additional legal achievements ==
- The National Labor Court upheld Itach Ma'aki's appeal and ruled that the shared household of a woman in a polygamous relationship will be assessed individually, when examining her eligibility for income support benefits In the 2016 the Association filed an appeal against the regional Labor Courts decision in Abu Jaber v. The National Insurance Institute, which rejected the right of a woman living in a polygamous and violent marriage to receive income support. The National Labor Court, which heard the appeal, ruled that the reality of life in a polygamous and violent marriage, where one is under the constant threat of having to relinquish parental rights, should not be seen the same way as the shared life of a nuclear family model couple living together, and therefore, the appellant was entitled to separate income support benefits.
- Revocation of rule denying income support stipends for women with cars The National Insurance Institute prohibited single mothers from receiving basic income support benefits if they owned a car or had regular use of one. In one of several successful appeals on this issue, in the 2005 case TSJ 3282/05 Meirav Ben-Nun v National Insurance Institute, Itach Ma'aki filed a petition to the High Court of Justice on behalf of five single mothers against the National Insurance Institute policy and the Income Support Law. Following numerous hearings, in 2012, in an acclaimed final ruling by Supreme Court President, Justice Beinish, the High Court of Justice ruled that the law should be revoked because it restricted the right to minimum dignity of those living in poverty in Israel and that women who are eligible for income support should be permitted to own/use a car.
- Cancellation of the employment test exemption for single mothers of children above the age of two In January 2003 Itach Ma'aki filed a High Court of Justice petition (HCJ 1433/03 Svetlana Bajtin v Minister of Finances et al) against the Economic Policy Law, which cancelled the exemption from the employment test for eligibility of single mothers of children above the age of two to receive income support. Under the contested section of the law, in order to receive an income assurance stipend, single mothers of children above the age of two were required, in addition to the income test, to report to the Employment Bureau and to accept any work offered. After the Employment Bureau amended its procedure for the employment of mothers of minor children according to the court's decision, in 2008 a binding ruling was handed down, stipulating that if a single parent has objective difficulty in finding reasonable supervision arrangements for the children, the term "appropriate work" is to be determined in view of this difficulty.
- Supreme Court ruling to remove a discriminatory clause against women from the Agudat Yisrael platform Following a prolonged struggle on behalf of the rights of women to be members of the ultra-Orthodox political parties, in January 2019 the High Court of Justice, in case HCJ 1823/15 Tamar Ben-Porat v Registrar of Political Parties, ordered the ultra-Orthodox party, Agudat Yisrael, to remove the discriminatory clause in its platform that bans women from being members of the party. Itach Ma'aki, together with Prof. Neta Ziv, represented 10 women's organizations that joined the petition filed by attorney Ben Porat. The petition includes a plea that the court stipulate that once the change in the platform has been made, the discrimination and ban on women joining the party must also be lifted in practice. This decision may directly affect all discriminatory policies of political parties in Israel.
- Creation of a unique model for promoting feminist leadership and legal discourse through the Clinic for Legal Feminism at the University of Haifa The Women Mentoring Women Program at the Clinic for Legal Feminism was launched in 2005 as a joint initiative of Itach Ma'aki and the Faculty of Law at the University of Haifa. As part of the program, women and men from diverse communities (ethnic, national, sexual, geographic, etc.), learned legal topics relating to broad women's issues to become "mentors of rights" for the rights of women in their communities, with the participation of students of the Haifa University Faculty of Law. After training, the participants worked in the field together with the Association as agents of social change. The program closed in 2015.

== Awards and recognition ==
- 2018: Emil Greenzweig Human Rights Award from the Association for Civil Rights in Israel.
