= Hans Ludwig Striem =

Israeli soldier & scientist (1920–2015)

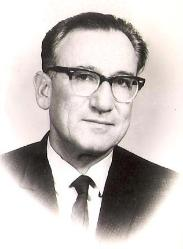

Hans Ludwig (Lutz) Striem (Hebrew: הנס לודויג שטרים; born 25 August 1920, died: 9 February 2015) was an Israeli who served as a military field intelligence lieutenant colonel in the Israel Defense Forces (IDF) and as a scientist at the Israel Atomic Energy Commission (IAEC).

== Biography ==
Lutz Striem was born in Berlin, Germany. He, his parents and his sister immigrated to Palestine in 1935. At the age of 15 he studied at the Ben-Yehuda Gymnasium in Tel Aviv and matriculated with distinctions. Striem began his military service during World War II as a volunteer in the British Army, first serving in Egypt and then in Siena, Italy. As a sergeant in the Field Survey Company 524 of the Corps of Royal Engineers, he was engaged with aerial photography and mapping.

When released in 1946, back in Palestine, Striem started his studies at the Hebrew University of Jerusalem on Mount Scopus. There he fought with the Haganah guards, but due to his military intelligence experience which was seen as a valuable asset, he was transferred to the Haganah headquarters in Tel Aviv.

Striem remained in the military during the 1948 Arab-Israeli War, being among the pioneer officers establishing the Israeli military field intelligence at the Israel Defense Forces (IDF). Striem was deeply involved in securing Israeli water rights (The War-over-water), the Sinai War and the Six Day War. He rose through the ranks as a department-head lieutenant colonel.

Following his military career, Striem served as a scientist (1968–1985) in the Israel Atomic Energy Commission (IAEC). He was deputy to the coordinator of the Nuclear Advisory Committee (1968–1972) and acting coordinator of the Nuclear Advisory Committee (1973). From 1974 to his retirement he held the position of head of the Site Licensing Department at the Licensing Division.

Alongside his military and civil service Striem continued his academic studies and research, obtaining his M.Sc. (1954) and Ph.D. (1972) from the Hebrew University of Jerusalem.

One of Striem’s most significant contributions was his coining of the term 'rainspell'. Analyzing the rainfall over 20 years in Jerusalem, he and Rosenan introduced the concept of rainspells, i. e. groups of successive hours or days with precipitation which together constitute a meteorologically significant period. Rainspells thus defined were found to be characterized by their yield, duration and “intensity”, i. e. the ratio between yield and duration of the spell as a whole.

In 1981 Striem spent a sabbatical as a visiting professor at the Rheinische Friedrich-Wilhelms-Universität, Bonn.
