= Ernst David Bergmann =

Israeli chemist (1903–1975)

- ארנסט דוד ברגמן
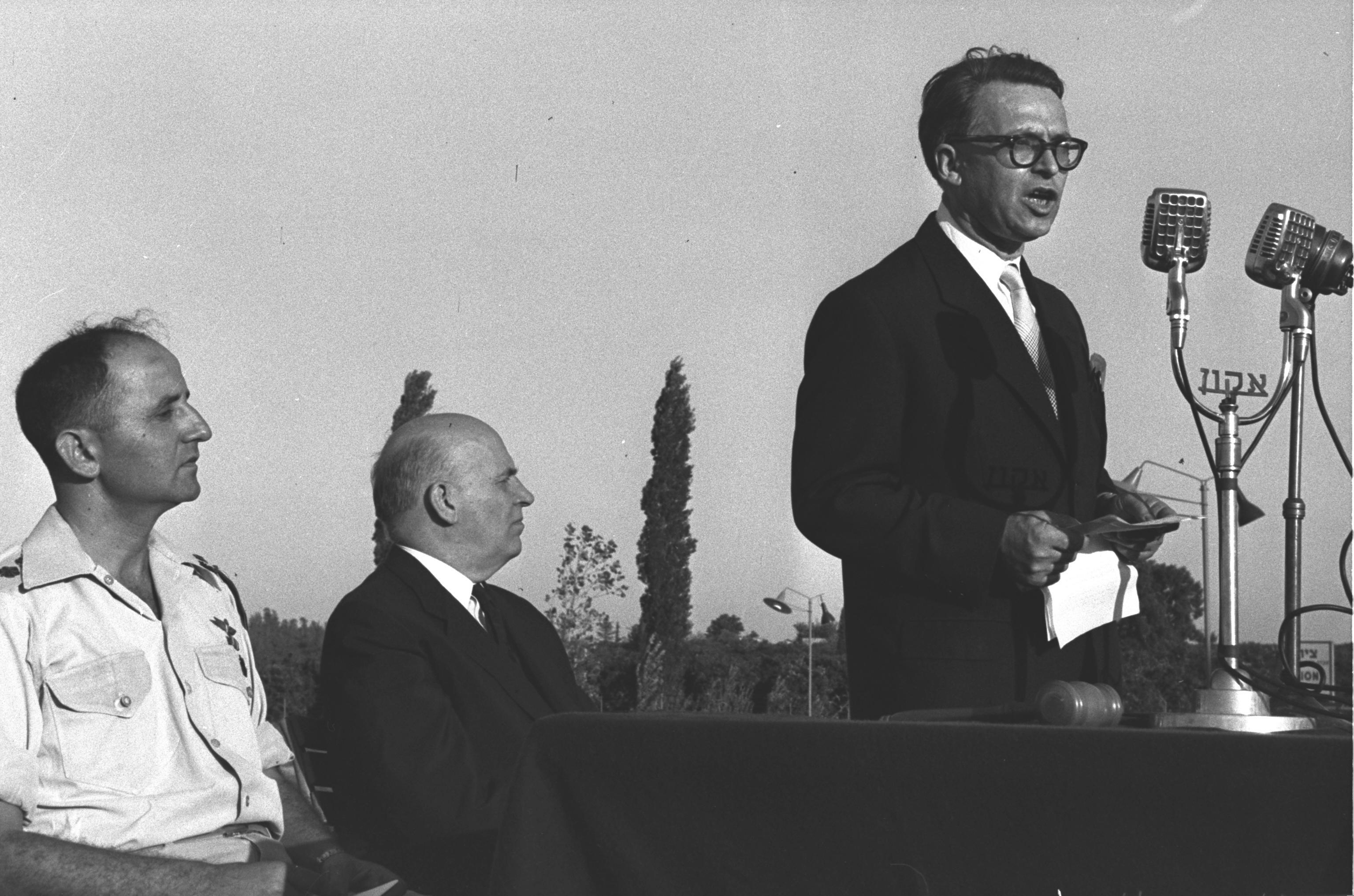
- Ernst David Bergmann speaking at the opening of "Atoms for Peace" exhibition in Israel (1956)
- Born: 1903; Germany
- Died: April 6, 1975 (aged 71); Haifa, Israel
- Education: University of Berlin, Germany
- Known for: Israel's Nuclear Program fluorine chemistry
- Awards: Israel Prize (1968)
- Scientific career
- Fields: Nuclear Chemistry
- Workplaces: Israel Atomic Energy Commission (IAEC); Daniel Sieff Research Institute in Palestine; Weizmann Institute of Science; Hebrew University of Jerusalem; Israel Defense Forces
- Doctoral advisor: Wilhelm Schlenk
- Doctoral students: Adam Heller

Ernst David Bergmann (Hebrew: ארנסט דוד ברגמן; 1903 – April 6, 1975) was an Israeli nuclear scientist and chemist. He is often considered the father of the Israeli nuclear program.

== Biography ==
Ernst David Bergmann was born in Germany, His father, Judah Bergmann, was a rabbi. He studied chemistry at the University of Berlin under Wilhelm Schlenk. He was awarded his Ph.D. in 1927. Bergmann continued to work at the university and wrote the "Comprehensive Manual of Organic Chemistry" (Ausführliches Lehrbuch der Organischen Chemie) together with Schlenk. The two-volume manual was published in 1932 and 1939, respectively; however, because Bergmann was Jewish his name was removed from the title page of the second volume.

Bergmann left for London in 1933 soon after the Nazis came to power, and began work with chemist and Zionist leader Chaim Weizmann. He turned down an offer of a position at Oxford from Sir Robert Robinson, an event that Robinson recalled years later with anger.

Bergmann left Europe less than a year later. He emigrated to Mandatory Palestine on January 1, 1934, to work at the Daniel Sieff Research Institute in Rehovot. During World War II he worked on defense projects for the French, British, and Americans. A year after the war, Bergmann returned to Sieff Institute, which went on to become the Weizmann Institute of Science.

Bergmann was married to the chemist Ottilie Blum.

== Scientific career ==
During the next several years Bergmann, who had become famous through his work and connection with Weizmann, became close friends with David Ben-Gurion, and was appointed to several prominent government positions: chief of the Israel Defense Forces' science department in August 1948, science adviser to minister of defense on July 15, 1951, and director of research of the Division of Research and Infrastructure of the Ministry of Defense in early 1952. In June 1952, he was appointed by Prime Minister David Ben-Gurion to be the first chairman of the Israel Atomic Energy Commission (IAEC), where he played a crucial role in leading the Israel nuclear program with Ben-Gurion and Defense Minister Shimon Peres.

That same year, he left the Weizmann Institute to become the chair of organic chemistry at the Hebrew University of Jerusalem, and worked with graduate students for the next two years at Technion in Haifa.

Bergmann's work at the IAEC was shrouded in secrecy, and the agency itself was unknown to the public until he revealed its existence in 1954. Bergmann offered to resign in June 1964 after Ben-Gurion had been replaced by Levi Eshkol, but was convinced to remain for two more years. He resigned as chair of the IAEC and the two defense ministry posts on April 1, 1966.

During his lifetime Bergmann published more than 500 peer reviewed scientific papers in international journals, and made critical contributions to fluorine chemistry.

== Awards and recognition ==
In 1968, Bergmann was awarded the Israel Prize in life sciences.

== See also ==
- List of Israel Prize recipients
