= Moshe Ron =

- משה רון
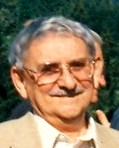
- Professor Moshe Ron
- Born: 1925; Warsaw, Poland
- Died: 2001 (aged 75–76); Haifa, Israel
- Other names: Moshe Zilberman (משה זילברמן)
- Occupation: Materials scientist

Moshe Ron (Hebrew: משה רון; 1925 in Warsaw, Poland – 2001 in Haifa, Israel) was an Israeli materials scientist which specialized in metal hydrides.

== Biography ==
Moshe Ron (Zilberman) was born in Poland. His family escaped to USSR before World War II. He started his academic education in soviet Central Asia during the war. After the war he tried to immigrate to Mandatory Palestine, but spent two years at Cyprus. He got his degree from the Hebrew University in Jerusalem. He did research on the Mössbauer effect in metals. Moshe Ron was the organizer and scientific supervisor of the Laboratory of Hydrogen Energy at Technion - Israel Institute of Technology. He contributed to the development of heat pumps based on use of metal hydrides. His research was supported by Daimler-Benz AG and Stuttgart University.

== Main publications ==
1. M. Ron. J. Less-Common Metals 104, (1984) 259.
2. M. Ron et al. Israeli Patenr # 55403 (1982); USA Patent # .4,436,539 (1982).
3. M. Ron and Y. Josephy. Z. Phys. Chem. N. F. 147, (1966), 241.
4. M. Ron and Y. Josephy. Z. Phys. Chem. N. F. 164, (1989), 1478.
5. M. Ron and Y. Josephy.Proceed. "International Workshop on Metal Hydrides for Hydrogen Storage Purification and Thermodyn. Devices". 1988, Stuttgart, Germany.
6. M. Ron. " A Vehicle Driven by Hydrogen within a City and Air Conditioned". Study, submitted to Daimler - Benz, 1993.
7. E. Bershadski, A. Klyuch and M. Ron. International Journal of Hydrogen Energy, 20 (1995) p. 29.
8. M. Ron, E. Bershadsky and Y. Josephy. International Journal of Hydrogen Energy, 17, (1992) 623.
9. M. Ron. US Patent # 4,507,263 1985; US Patent # 4,607,826 1986.
10. Y. Yosephy, Y. Eisenberg, S. Peretz, A. Ben-David and M.Ron. J. Less-Common Metals 104, (1984) 297.
11. E. Bershadsky, Y. Josephy and M. Ron. J. Less-Common Metals 153, (1989) 65.
