= Assaf Friedler =

Israeli organic chemist and biochemist

- אסף פרידלר
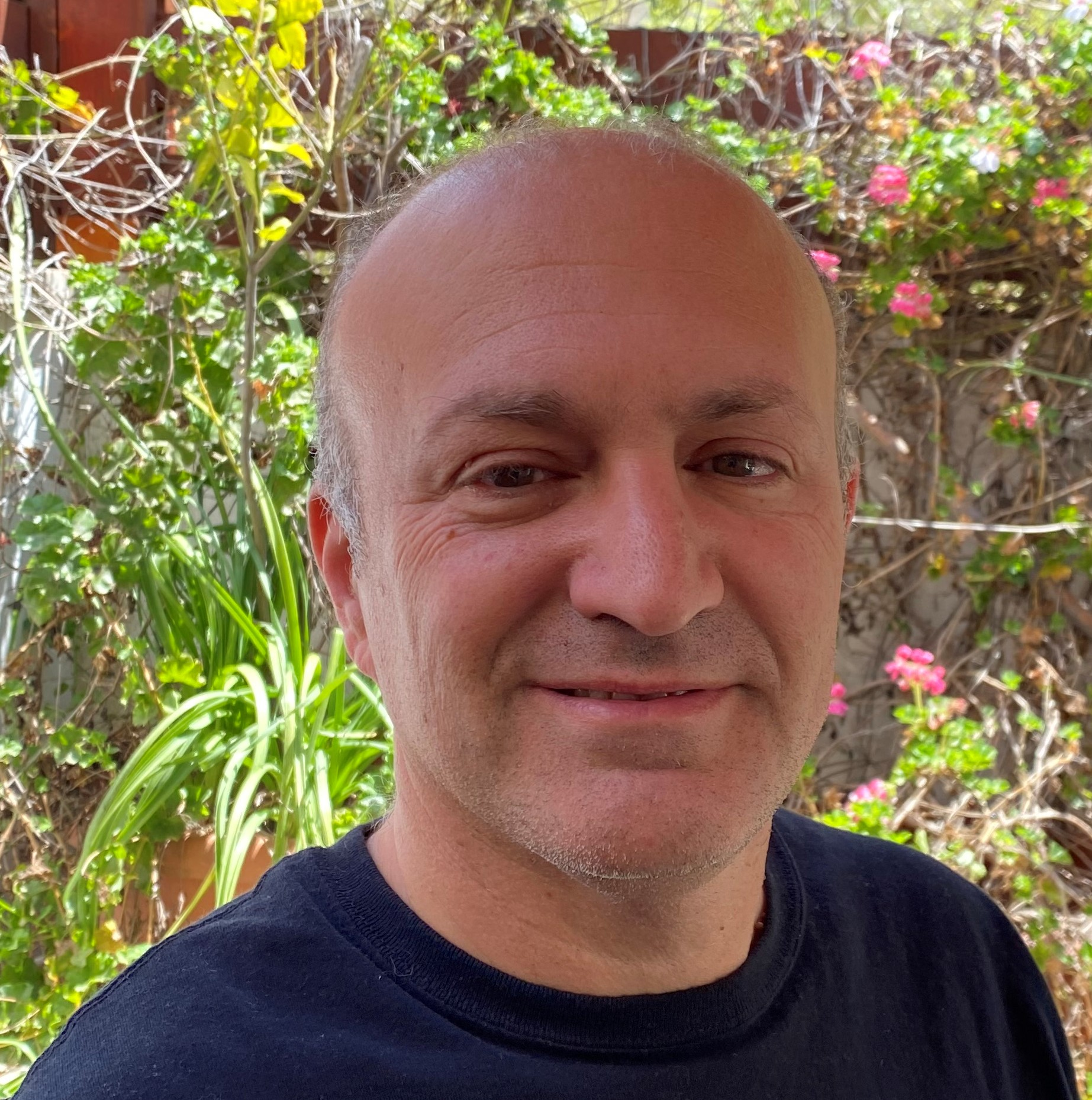
- Born: August 29, 1971 (age 55); Haifa, Israel
- Education: Hebrew University of Jerusalem (BSc, PhD)
- Known for: Research on protein–protein interactions
- Scientific career
- Fields: Chemical biology Peptide chemistry Protein chemistry Biophysical chemistry Medicinal chemistry
- Workplaces: Hebrew University of Jerusalem; Singapore–Hebrew University Alliance for Research and Enterprise (SHARE)
- Doctoral advisor: Chaim Gilon
- Other academic advisors: Sir Alan Fersht
- Website: friedlerlab.huji.ac.il

Assaf Friedler (Hebrew: אסף פרידלר; born 29 August 1971) is an Israeli organic chemist, biochemist and academic administrator. He is a professor at the Institute of Chemistry at the Hebrew University of Jerusalem and the director and chief executive officer of the Singapore–Hebrew University Alliance for Research and Enterprise (SHARE), the university's research and enterprise centre in Singapore.

== Early life and education ==
Friedler was born and raised in Haifa, Israel. He studied chemistry at the Hebrew University of Jerusalem, where he completed a Bachelor of Science degree in 1994.

He subsequently began doctoral studies in organic chemistry at the Hebrew University under the supervision of Chaim Gilon. He completed his PhD in chemistry, with distinction, in 2000. In the same year, Friedler moved to the United Kingdom, where he was a postdoctoral fellow at the Medical Research Council Centre for Protein Engineering in Cambridge and worked in the laboratory of Sir Alan Fersht.

== Career ==
In 2004, Friedler joined the Institute of Chemistry at the Hebrew University of Jerusalem as a senior lecturer. He became an associate professor with tenure in 2009 and was appointed full professor in 2015. From 2005 to 2009, he headed the university's undergraduate chemistry–biology programme. He was head of the School of Chemistry.

Friedler served as vice rector of the Hebrew University from 2016 to 2020. During the same period, he chaired the university's central student admissions committee. He was dean of its Faculty of Science from 2020 to 2024. He chaired the Hebrew University for the Youth from 2019 to 2024.

In October 2024, Friedler became director and chief executive officer of SHARE, the Singapore–Hebrew University Alliance for Research and Enterprise.

== Research ==
Friedler's research is in chemical biology, peptide chemistry, protein chemistry, biophysical chemistry, and medicinal chemistry. It focuses on the use of peptides and peptide-based methods to study and inhibit protein–protein interactions, with a particular focus on interactions involving intrinsically disordered protein regions. His work has used synthetic, structural and biophysical approaches to investigate the molecular basis of these interactions and peptide-based methods to modulate them.

His research has examined interactions involving the tumour-suppressor protein p53, including its interactions with MDM2. His work has also addressed proteins associated with apoptosis and cancer-related signalling pathways. He has also studied interactions among HIV-1 proteins, including integrase, Rev, Vif, and Tat, and peptide-based approaches to influencing viral protein interactions. A particular focus of Friedler's research has been the use of intrinsically disordered proteins as therapeutic targets and as sources for peptide inhibitors of protein–protein interactions.

Other work by Friedler and his collaborators has addressed protein oligomerisation and protein aggregation, including amyloid formation and the aggregation of proteins associated with cancer and neurodegenerative disease. His more recent research has also included methods for synthesizing multiphosphorylated peptides and protein-interaction-based biosensors.

== Honours and awards ==
- 2000 – Human Frontier Science Program Long-Term Postdoctoral Fellowship.
- 2004 – Career Development Award, Human Frontier Science Program
- 2007 – Starting Grant, European Research Council
- 2013 – Rector's Prize for Excellence in Research and Teaching, Hebrew University of Jerusalem
- 2015 – Sir Zelman Cowen Universities Fund Prize for Discovery in Medical Research
- 2018 – Michael Milken Prize for Excellence in Teaching.
