= Raphael Amit =

American economist

Raphael ("Raffi") Amit
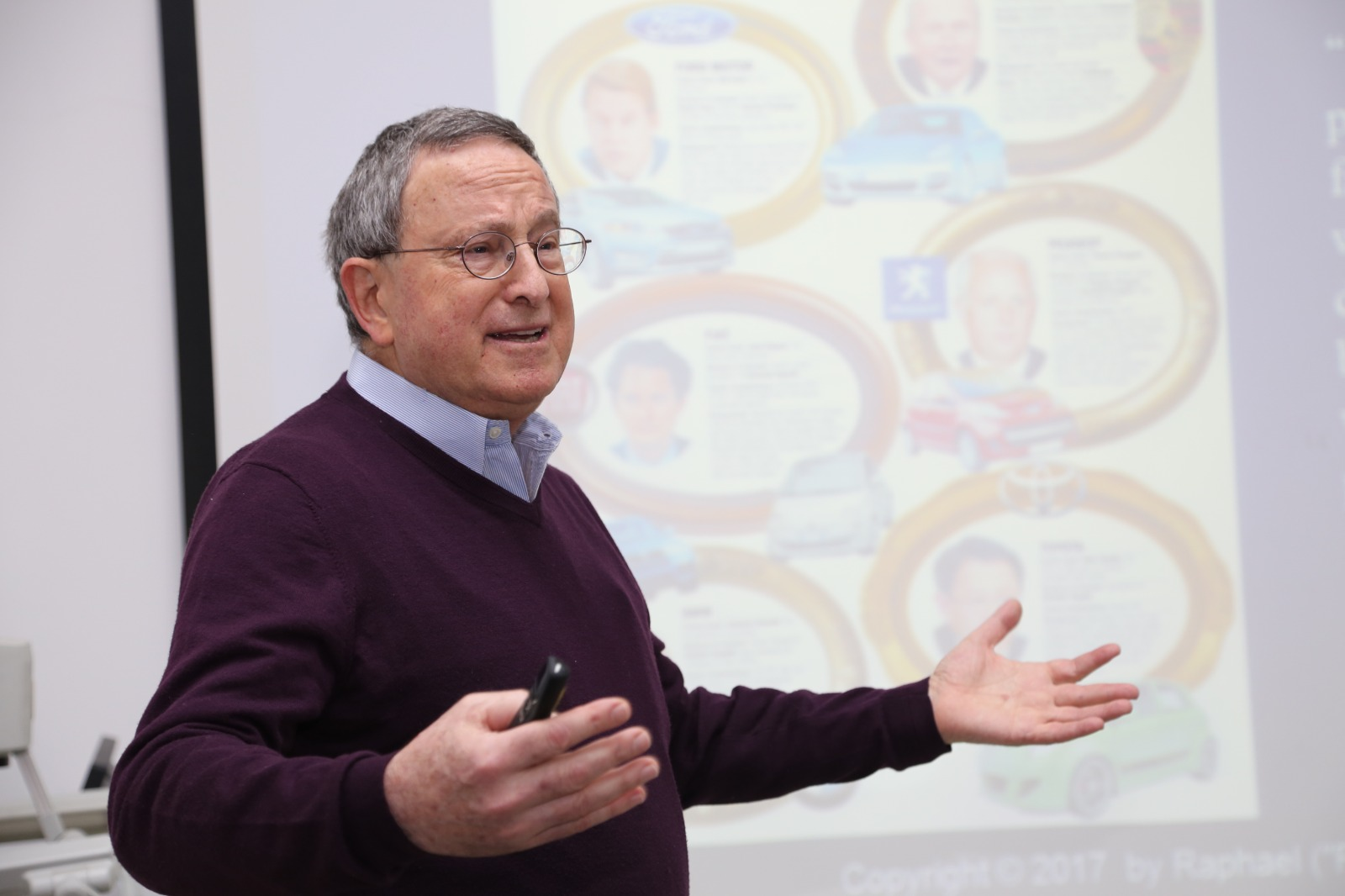
- Picture of Raphael Amit teaching
- Occupation: Professor

Academic background
- Education: BA., Economics; MA., Economics; PhD., Managerial Economics and Decision Science
- Alma mater: Hebrew University of Jerusalem; Northwestern University

Academic work
- Institutions: University of Pennsylvania

Raphael ("Raffi") Amit is an economist, author, and academic. He is the Marie and Joseph Melone Professor and a professor of management at the University of Pennsylvania Wharton School.

Amit's research focuses on family firms, family offices, and business model innovation strategy. He received the 2007 Thought Leader Award from the Academy of Management and is an elected fellow of the Strategic Management Society.

== Education ==
Amit earned a BA and MA in Economics from the Hebrew University of Jerusalem followed by a PhD in Managerial Economics and Decision Sciences from the Kellogg Graduate School of Management, Northwestern University.

== Career ==
Following the completion of his PhD, Amit began his professional career as a senior energy economist at Data Resources. He then served on the faculty of Industrial Engineering and Management of the Technion, Israel Institute of Technology. Between 1984 and 1990, he was on the faculty at the Kellogg Graduate School of Management, Northwestern University, and from 1990 to 1999, he taught at the Faculty of Commerce, University of British Columbia in Vancouver, Canada. In 1992, he founded and worked as director of the Entrepreneurship and Venture Capital Research Center. He was appointed the Peter Wall Distinguished Professor in 1994. In 1999, he joined the Wharton School at the University of Pennsylvania as the Robert B. Goergen Professor of entrepreneurship and Professor of Management, a role he held until 2016. In 2016, he became the Marie and Joseph Melone Professor and professor of management at Wharton. Amit served as the academic director of Wharton Entrepreneurship from 1999 to 2015 and director of the Wharton Electronic Business Initiative from 2000 to 2004. In 2004, he founded and acted as academic director and chairman of the executive committee of the Wharton Global Family Alliance, a position he continues to hold.

Amit was the chair of the board of directors of Creo Products for six years from 1996 to 2001.

== Research and work ==
Amit's research focuses on family firms, family offices and on business model innovation strategy. His studies on family enterprises have centered on ownership, managerial practices, governance, wealth management, and on family offices. He has also studied and advised ultra high net worth families and their businesses.

Amit's research has also focused on designing business models and on business strategy. He has co-authored the book Business Model Innovation Strategy: Transformational Concepts and Tools for Entrepreneurial Leaders with Christoph Zott.

Amit's work has been widely cited, having received over 80,000 citations according to Google Scholar as of September 2025.

== Awards and honors ==
- 2007 – Thought Leader Award, Academy of Management
- 2007 – Standard Life Investments Finance Prize, European Corporate Governance Institute
- 2009 – Fellow, Strategic Management Society

== Bibliography ==
=== Books ===
- Amit, Raphael; Avriel, Mordecai, eds. (1982). Perspectives on Resource Policy Modeling: Energy and Minerals. Ballinger. ISBN 978-0884108375.
- Hitt, Michael. A; Amit, Raphael; Lucrier, Charles E.; Nixon, Robert D., eds. (2008). Creating Value: Winners in the New Business Environment. Wiley-Blackwell. ISBN 978-0470707319.
- Amit, Raphael; Zott, Christoph (2020). Business Model Innovation Strategy: Transformational Concepts and Tools for Entrepreneurial Leaders. Wiley. ISBN 978-1119689683.

=== Selected articles ===
- Amit, Raphael; Schoemaker, Paul J. H. (1993). "Strategic assets and organizational rent". Strategic Management Journal. 14 (1): 33–46. doi:10.1002/smj.4250140105.
- Amit, Raphael; Zott, Christoph (2001). "Value creation in E-business". Strategic Management Journal. 22 (6–7): 493–520. doi:10.1002/smj.187.
- Villalonga, Belen; Amit, Raphael (2006). "How do family ownership, control and management affect firm value?". Journal of Financial Economics. 80 (2): 385–417. doi:10.1016/j.jfineco.2004.12.005.
- Zott, Christoph; Amit, Raphael (2010). "Business Model Design: An Activity System Perspective". Long Range Planning. 43 (2–3): 216–226. doi:10.1016/j.lrp.2009.07.004.
- Zott, Christoph; Amit, Raphael; Massa, Lorenzo (2011). "The Business Model: Recent Developments and Future Research". Journal of Management. 37 (4): 1019–1042. doi:10.1177/0149206311406265.
