= Yishai Beer =

Israeli general

Aluf Yishai Beer
- ישי בר
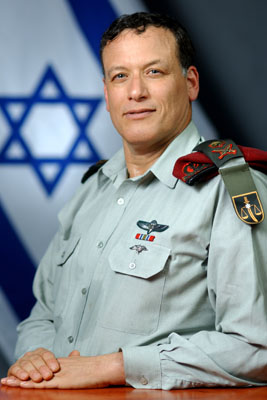
- Born: 1956 (age 69–70); Jerusalem, Israel
- Military career
- Branch: Israel Defense Forces
- Service years: 1974–2008
- Rank: Aluf
- Unit: Paratroopers Brigade
- Commands: President of the Israeli Military Court of Appeals
- Conflicts: Operation Entebbe; Operation Litani

Aluf Yishai Beer (Hebrew: ישי בר; born 1956) is a former general in the Israel Defense Forces, head of a reserve call-up, and former president of the Israeli Military Court of Appeals.

== Biography ==
He was drafted into the IDF in 1974 and joined the Paratroopers Brigade. Two years later he took part as a platoon leader in Operation Entebbe, freeing Israeli hostages flown to Uganda. He also participated in Operation Litani and as a reserve in the 1982 Lebanon War. He rejoined the regular service in May 2002 when he was appointed to his current post, although as a doctor of law, he continues to work as a Law professor. During his career Beer received a B.A. from Hebrew University and an M.A. from the London School of Economics. In November 2008, Beer announced his retirement from the IDF.

== Career and publications ==
=== Academic achievements ===
LL.B. (honors), Hebrew University, 1983; LL.M., London School of Economics, 1986; Ph.D., Hebrew University, 1990. Law clerk to Justice Dov Levin, Israel Supreme Court, 1983–95. Admitted to the Israel Bar Association, 1985. Lecturer in law, 1992; senior lecturer in law, 1994. Visiting scholar at Harvard Law School in 1990–92, and research fellow at New York University Stern School of Business in 1993. Academic awards include: the Argov Scholarship at the London School of Economics (1986); the Golda Meir Prize (1987), the Milken Prize for Outstanding Teaching (1990), and the Bloomfield Prize for the best Ph.D. thesis in the Social Sciences (1991) from the Hebrew University; and a research grant from the Israel Science Foundation – Israel Academy of Sciences and Humanities (1994–96). His research interests are taxation, especially of financial instruments.

== Publications ==
Recent publications include:

- "The Taxation of Interest Swaps and the Financial Service Charge: Toward a Consistent Approach," 1 Florida Tax Review (1994) pp. 729–743;
- "Taxation of non-profit Organisations: Towards Efficient Tax Rules," British Tax Review (1995) pp. 156–172;
- "Taxation of Complex Transactions: Do Not Ignore the Options," 29 Mishpatim (1998) pp. 213–239 (in Hebrew).
