= Semion Goldin =

Israeli historian (born 1967)

Semion Goldin (Hebrew: סמיון גולדין; born 1967) is an Israeli historian. He is a senior research fellow at the Leonid Nevzlin Research Center for Russian and Eastern European Jewry in Israel.

== Career ==
Goldin is responsible for the programmatic development and administrative aspects of the Nevzlin Center. He received his PhD cum laude from the Hebrew University of Jerusalem. His dissertation, published as monograph, focuses on the Russian Army policy towards the Jews during WWI, from 1914 to 1917.

Goldin now teaches at the Hebrew University of Jerusalem. He has published several articles on various topics of East European Jewish history in the twentieth century.

== Research ==
Goldin's historical research is mostly focused on the last years of the Russian Empire, and its military's highly destructive and ultimately disastrous persecution of the Jews during WWI.

The specific aspects he researches are:

- The "Jewish Question" and the political situation in the Russian Empire
- Jews as the Other in Polish and Russian nationalist ideology
- The Russian Army and the Jews at the start of the twentieth century
- Russian Army authority and activity in civilian administration during WWI
- Russian Army Command and the negative stereotype of the Jew
- Russian Army's libelous persecution of the Jewish population in WWI
- Soldiers, officers, and the Jewish population of the frontal zone in WWI
- Deportations of the Jewish population and hostage taking during WWI
- Antisemitism and pogroms in the military of the Russian Empire

Goldin's research papers are published in professional publications:

- Semion Goldin in Google Scholar
- Semion Goldin in JSTOR
- Semion Goldin in Google Books
- Semion Goldin in Hebrew University

== Books ==
- The Russian Army and the Jewish Population, 1914–1917: Libel, Persecution, Reaction.

This book represents a new reading of a key moment in the history of East European Jewry, namely the period preceding the collapse of the Russian Empire. Offering a novel analysis of relations between the Russian army and Jews during the First World War, it points to the army and military authorities as the 'gravediggers' of the Jews’ fragile co-existence with the tsarist regime. It focuses on various aspects of the Russian army’s brutal treatment of Jews living in or near the Eastern Front, where three quarters of European Jewry were living when the war began. At the same time, it shows the enormous harm this anti-Jewish campaign wreaked on the Russian empire’s economy, finances, public security, and international status.

- Jewish Migration in Modern Times: The Case of Eastern Europe.

This collection examines various aspects of Jewish migration within, from and to eastern Europe between 1880 and the present. It focuses on not only the wide variety of factors that often influenced the fateful decision to immigrate, but also the personal experience of migration and the critical role of individuals in larger historical processes.
