= Nissim Benvenisty =

Israeli researcher

- ניסים בנבנישתי
- Education: Hebrew University
- Known for: Research on human pluripotent stem cells
- Awards: The Katzir Prize; ACTO Prize (Japan); Milken Prize; Kaye Prize; Yamagiwa-Yoshida Fellowship (Japan); Hestrin Prize; Senta Foulkes Prize (London).
- Scientific career
- Fields: Stem Cells, Human Genetics, Cancer Research, Hereditary Disorders
- Workplaces: Director, Azrieli Center for Stem Cells and Genetic Research, Hebrew University
- Website: http://benvenisty.huji.ac.il/

Nissim Benvenisty (Hebrew: ניסים בנבנישתי) is an Israeli researcher who is a Professor of Genetics and the Herbert Cohn Chair in Cancer Research and the Director of "The Azrieli Center for Stem Cells and Genetic Research" at the Alexander Silberman Institute of Life Sciences, Hebrew University.

Benvenisty earned his M.D. and Ph.D. degrees from the Hebrew University, and conducted postdoctoral fellowship at Harvard University. He is a member of the steering committee of the International Stem Cell Initiative (ISCI), the Programme Board of the UK-RMP, and serves as the academic advisor for the International Society for Stem Cell Research (ISSCR). He is a founding member of the Israel Stem Cell Society, and he is the Founder and CSO of NewStem Ltd.

== Research ==
Benvenisty's research projects focus on pluripotent stem cell biology, human genetic disorders, tissue engineering, genetic and epigenetic aberrations and cancer research. His laboratory made several contributions in these fields of research:

- Differentiation and genetic manipulation of human embryonic stem cells: In 2000, his laboratory pioneered the first demonstration of both spontaneous differentiation of human embryonic stem cells into embryoid bodies and direct differentiation into more than ten cell types. In addition, his laboratory was the first to demonstrate genetic manipulation of human embryonic stem cells. These discoveries where highlighted by a Focus article in "Science".
- Disease modelling using human pluripotent stem cells: Benvenisty's laboratory was the first to show a model for a human disease using human pluripotent stem cells. Since then he has demonstrated six methodologies to generate models for genetic disorders, generating more than a dozen models for studying mainly neural diseases (such as Fragile X syndrome) and imprinting disorders (such as Prader-Willi syndrome).
- Tumorigenicity and immunogenicity of human pluripotent stem cells: Immunogenicity and tumorigenicity of human pluripotent stem cells are very relevant for the safe and efficient use of these cells in regenerative medicine. Benvenisty's laboratory was the first to study the immunogenicity of the cells, and to analyze the basis of their tumorigenicity.
- Genetic and epigenetic stability of human pluripotent stem cells: The genetic and epigenetic instability of human pluripotent stem cells is a major characteristic of the cells affecting their tumorigenicity and their use in disease modeling. Benvenisty's lab was the first to study the chromosomal stability of human induce pluripotent stem cells, and developed methodologies to analyze genetic and epigenetic aberrations.
- Haploid human embryonic stem cells and genome-wide screenings: Benvenisty's lab was the first to generate haploid human embryonic stem cells (having half of the chromosomes). His laboratory utilized these cells for genome-wide genetic screenings to analyze human development and disease.

Benvenisty's lab serves as an incubator for excellent students, and over ten of his former students hold principal investigator positions in the Israeli academia (Hebrew University, Weizmann Institute, Tel-Aviv University, Bar-Ilan University, Technion).

== Awards and honors ==
- The Rappaport Prize for excellence in the field of biomedical research (2023)
- The Katzir Prize (2020) for exceptional achievements in life sciences, given triennial by FISEB/ILANIT.
- Awarded Member of Academia Europaea (2018).
- The ACTO Prize (Japan) (2018) for "Best Innovation in Stem Cell Research".
- Milken Prize for Excellent Teachers, Hebrew University (2016).
- Awarded the "Azrieli Center for Stem Cells and Genetic Research" by the Azrieli Foundation (Canada) (2014).
- Kaye Prize for best innovation (2010).
- Awarded the "Legacy-Heritage Stem Cell Center" (USA) (2006).
- Yamagiwa-Yoshida Memorial International Cancer Study Fellowship (Japan) (2000).
- Hestrin Prize in Biochemistry and Molecular Biology (1997).
- Senta Foulkes Prize (London).
