= Lydia Aran =

Israeli scholar and professor

- לידיה ארן
- Born: 1921; Vilnius, Lithuania
- Died: March 5, 2013 (aged 91); Jerusalem, Israel
- Scientific career
- Fields: Buddhism
- Institutions: Hebrew University of Jerusalem

Lydia Aran (Hebrew: לידיה ארן; October 1921 – March 5, 2013 in Jerusalem), was a professor emerita at the Hebrew University of Jerusalem and a scholar of Buddhism. She taught in the Hebrew University's Department of Indian Studies until her retirement in 1998.

Aran was born in Vilnius, Lithuania, where she survived the Holocaust by being hidden, with her twin sister, in the small village of Ignalina by her high school history teacher, Krystyna Adolph, an ethnically Polish Catholic.

== Books ==
- The Art of Nepal
- Buddhism: An Introduction to Buddhist Philosophy and Religion (Hebrew) 1993
- Destroying a Civilization: Tibet 1950-2000 (Hebrew) 2007
