= Amos Panet =

Israeli virologist

- עמוס פנט
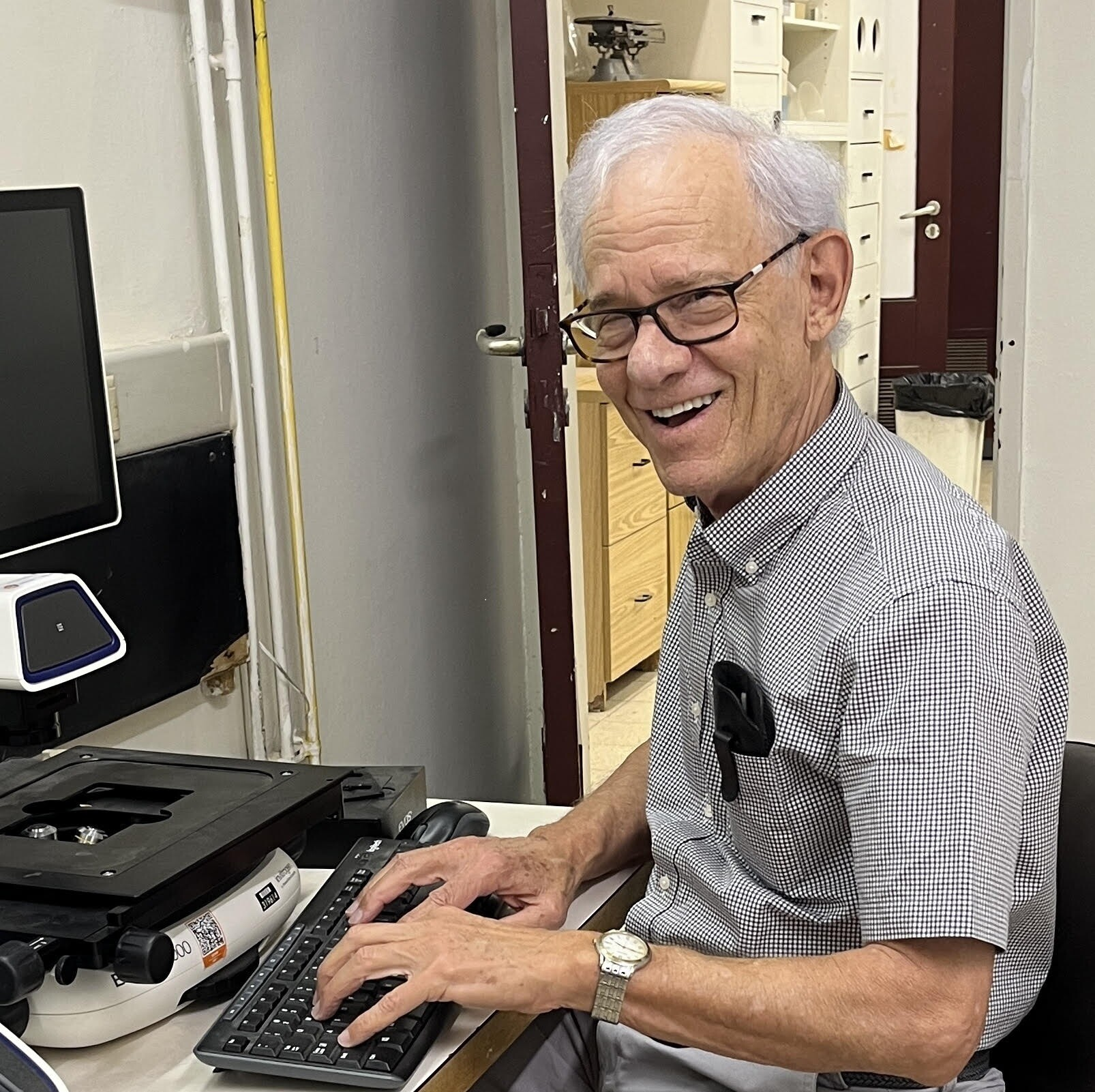
- Education: Hebrew University of Jerusalem
- Scientific career
- Fields: virology, biotechnology
- Workplaces: Hebrew University of Jerusalem

Amos Panet (Hebrew: עמוס פנט) is a distinguished Professor of Virology at the Hebrew University of Jerusalem. His research has focused on virology and biotechnology.

== Early life ==
Panet was drafted into the Israeli army in 1959, where he served as a combat officer. In 1962, he began his studies at the Hebrew University of Jerusalem, majoring in biochemistry. He continued his education there, earning a doctorate in biological chemistry in 1971.

== Research ==
After completing his PhD, Panet joined the laboratory of Nobel laureate Gobind Khorana at the Massachusetts Institute of Technology (MIT) as a postdoctoral fellow. During his time at Khorana's lab, Panet developed pioneering methods for the chemical synthesis of DNA. His research focused on developing techniques for DNA amplification using DNA polymerase and synthetic DNA primers, with significant findings published in 1974, which contributed to the subsequent development of PCR technology, which was described by Kary Mullis in 1986.

Influenced by the work of Nobel laureate David Baltimore on retroviruses, Panet shifted his research focus from chemistry to virology in 1973. In 1975, he joined the Hebrew University - Hadassah Medical School as a faculty member, where he has since served as a professor of virus research.

=== Retrovirus research and anti-HIV drug development ===
As a professor at the Hebrew University of Jerusalem, Panet later investigated the mechanisms of viral replication and pathogenesis, focusing on viruses such as HIV and herpes viruses. He also identified viral proteins that serve as targets for antiviral drugs and vaccine development.

== Career ==
Panet has been associated with the Hebrew University of Jerusalem since 1982.

=== Director of research at BTG Corp ===
During his tenure, he served as the chief scientist and director of at Bio-Technology General Corp, an Israeli biotechnology company, where he contributed to the development of new drugs and vaccines. During his time at BTG Corp, he contributed to the development of two FDA-approved compounds: the Human Growth Hormone and the Hepatitis B virus vaccine.

=== Entrepreneurial career ===
He co-founded Medgenix, a biotech company focused on developing a new devise for the sustained release of hormones such as Erythropoietin. Another venture initiated by Panet was Theravir, which focused on developing an oncolytic virus for cancer therapy. He also founded Virucure Corp., which focuses on developing a modified virus as a treatment for cancer.

== Selected publications ==
- Shapir, N., Miari, R., Blum, S., Schwartz, D., Chernin, G., Neil, G.A., Afik, D., Panet, A., Preclinical and Preliminary Clinical Evaluation of Genetically Transduced Dermal Tissue Implants for the Sustained Secretion of Erythropoietin and Interferon α, (2015) Human Gene Therapy Clinical Development, 26, 4:216-227.
- Weisblum, Y., Panet, A., Zakay-Rones, Z., Vitenshtein, A., Haimov-Kochman, R., Goldman-Wohl, D., Oiknine-Djian, E., Yamin, R., Meir, K., Amsalem, H., Imbar, ., Mandelboim, O., Yagel, S., Wolf, D.G., Human cytomegalovirus induces a distinct innate immune response in the maternal-fetal interface, (2015) Virology, 485, :289-296.
- Berger, A.A., Gil, Y., Panet, A., Weisblum, Y., Oiknine-Djian, E., Gropp, M., Steiner, D., Reubinoff, B.E., Wolf, D.G., Transition toward human cytomegalovirus susceptibility in early human embryonic stem cell-derived neural precursors, (2015) Journal of Virology, 89, 21:11159-11164.
- Tsalenchuck, Y., Steiner, I., Panet, A., Innate defense mechanisms against HSV-1 infection in the target tissues, skin and brain, (2016) Journal of NeuroVirology, 22, 5:641-649.
- Weisblum, Y., Oiknine-Djian, E., Zakay-Rones, Z., Vorontsov, O., Haimov-Kochman, R., Nevo, Y., Stockheim, D., Yagel, S., Panet, A., Wolf, D.G., APOBEC3A is upregulated by human cytomegalovirus (HCMV) in the maternal-fetal interface, acting as an innate anti-HCMV effector, (2017) Journal of Virology, 91, 23.
- Glasner, A., Oiknine-Djian, E., Weisblum, Y., Diab, M., Panet, A., Wolf, D.G., Mandelboim, O., Zika virus escapes NK cell detection by upregulating major histocompatibility complex class I molecules, (2017) Journal of Virology, 91, 22.
- Zafir-Lavie, I., Miari, R., Sherbo, S., Krispel, S., Tal, O., Liran, A., Shatil, T., Badinter, F., Goltsman, H., Shapir, N., Benhar, I., Neil, G.A., Panet, A., Sustained secretion of anti-tumor necrosis factor α monoclonal antibody from ex vivo genetically engineered dermal tissue demonstrates therapeutic activity in mouse model of rheumatoid arthritis, (2017) Journal of Gene Medicine, 19, 8.
- Weisblum, Y., Oiknine-Djian, E., Vorontsov, O.M., Haimov-Kochman, R., Zakay-Rones, Z., Meir, K., Shveiky, D., Elgavish, S., Nevo, Y., Roseman, M., Bronstein, M., Stockheim, D., From, I., Eisenberg, I., Lewkowicz, A.A., Yagel, S., Panet, A., Wolf, D.G., Zika virus infects early- and midgestation human maternal decidual tissues, inducing distinct innate tissue responses in the maternal-fetal interface, (2017) Journal of Virology, 91, 4.
- Zafir-Lavie, I., Sherbo, S., Goltsman, H., Badinter, F., Yeini, E., Ofek, P., Miari, R., Tal, O., Liran, A., Shatil, T., Krispel, S., Shapir, N., Neil, G.A., Benhar, I., Panet, A., Satchi-Fainaro, R., Successful intracranial delivery of trastuzumab by gene-therapy for treatment of HER2-positive breast cancer brain metastases, (2018) Journal of Controlled Release, 291, :80-89.
- Oiknine-Djian, E., Weisblum, Y., Panet, A., Wong, H.N., Haynes, R.K., Wolfa, D.G., The artemisinin derivative artemisone is a potent inhibitor of human cytomegalovirus replication, (2018) Antimicrobial Agents and Chemotherapy, 62, 7.
- Oiknine-Djian, E., Bar-On, S., Laskov, I., Lantsberg, D., Haynes, R.K., Panet, A., Wolf, D.G., Artemisone demonstrates synergistic antiviral activity in combination with approved and experimental drugs active against human cytomegalovirus, (2019) Antiviral Research, 172.
- Alfi, O., From, I., Yakirevitch, A., Drendel, M., Wolf, M., Meir, K., Zakay-Rones, Z., Nevo, Y., Elgavish, S., Ilan, O., Weisblum, Y., Tayeb, S., Gross, M., Jonas, W., Ives, J., Oberbaum, M., Panet, A., Wolf, D.G., Human Nasal Turbinate Tissues in Organ Culture as a Model for Human Cytomegalovirus Infection at the Mucosal Entry Site, (2020) Journal of virology, 94, 19.

== Personal life ==
Panet is married to Rivka and has three children and eleven grandchildren.
