= Daphna Hacker =

Israeli scholar (born 1969)

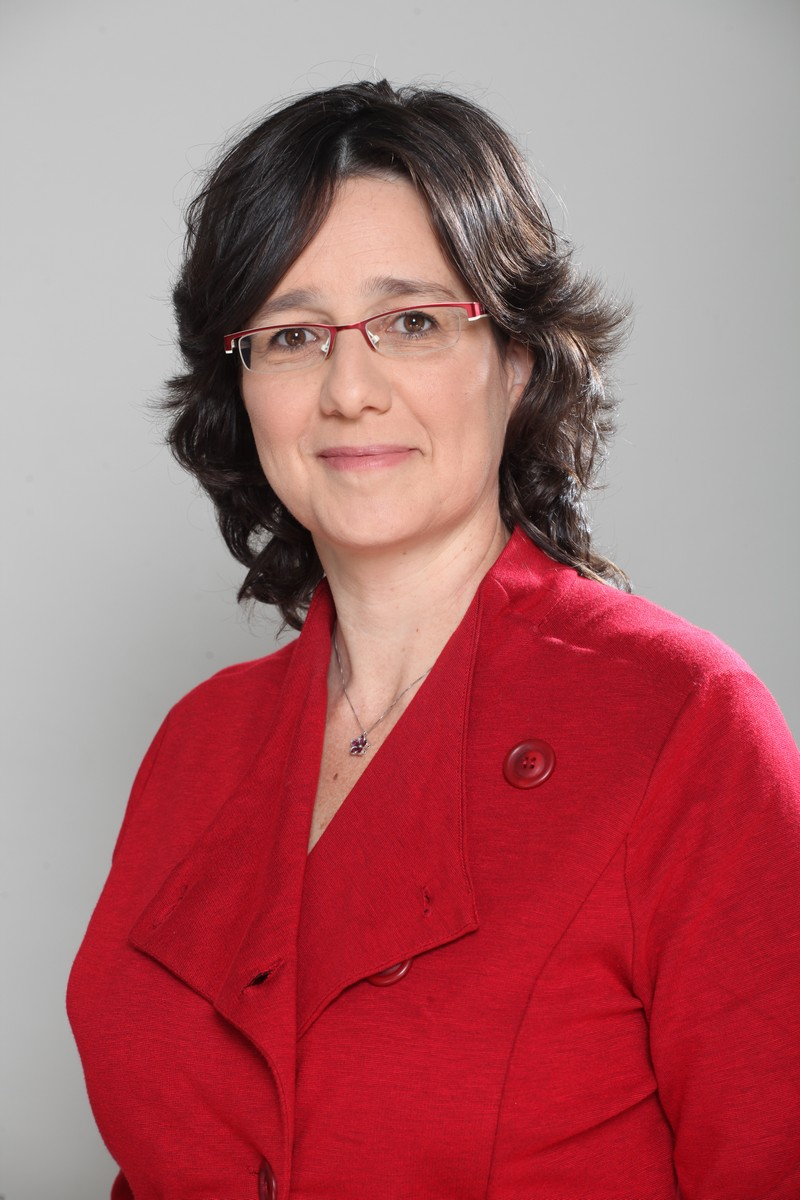
- Born: 16 April 1969 (age 57); Jerusalem, Israel
- Spouse: Elon
- Children: 2

Academic background
- Education: LL.B, 1994, Hebrew University of Jerusalem; LL.M., 1996, Washington College of Law; PhD., 2004, Tel Aviv University
- Thesis: Motherhood’, ‘Fatherhood’, and Law: A Sociological Analysis of the Field that Shapes Custody and Visitation Arrangements (2004)

Academic work
- Sub-discipline: family law, feminist jurisprudence
- Institutions: Tel Aviv University

Daphna Hacker (Hebrew: דפנה הקר; born 16 April 1969) is a full professor at the Tel Aviv University law faculty and Women and Gender Studies Program. After publishing Legalized Families in the Era of Bordered Globalization, Hacker was awarded the 2018 LSA Jacob Book prize.

== Early life and education ==
After attending Rene Cassin Alliance High School and serving in the IDF, Hacker earned her LL.B in 1994 from the Hebrew University of Jerusalem. She then moved to North America where she graduated with an LL.M. at the Washington College of Law in 1996 (sum com laude).

== Career ==
From 1993 to 1994, Hacker was a research assistant for Michael Atlan at the Hebrew University of Jerusalem law faculty. From there, she worked as a law clerk at Veisglass-Almagor Law Firm and was later admitted to the Israel Bar Association. By 2000, Hacker was teaching at Tel Aviv University. Originally a teacher in their Sociology and Anthropology department, she was promoted to assistant professor at the law faculty and the Women and Gender Studies Program by 2005. In 2007, she began advocating for legislation ratifying Israeli law that treats single or married women differently. She described that she has received bodily threats from men's rights organizations for her advocacy, including the slashing of her tires, threatening phone calls, and calls to her employer.

After receiving a grant from the New Israel Fund, Hacker joined the Israeli Women's Network (IWN) and served for a decade as a board member of the Itach-Maaki Women Lawyers for Social Justice organization. In 2010, she received a nomination to the Young Scholars in Humanities and Social Science Forum of the Israeli Academy of Science.

In 2011, Hacker resigned from the Governmental Committee on Parental Responsibility upon Divorce. The following year, she published Family Issues from a Legal Perspective through the Modan Publishing House and the Ministry of Defense. In 2013, she was awarded the Katan Award for the Advancement of Gender Justice through Voluntary Work. For her work on women in Israel, she was the inaugural winner of the "Small Signal award," named after Yossi Klein, whom the non-profit Female Spirit Association gives to women who volunteer for gender justice.

Beginning in 2014, she became the chief editor of Tel-Aviv University Law Review.

In 2018, she was appointed head of the gender program at Tel Aviv University. As well, her book Legalized Families in the Era of Bordered Globalization, published by the Cambridge University Press, won the 2018 Law and Society Association (LSA) Herbert Jacob Book Prize.

In 2022, Prof. Hacker was elected by a majority of 115 countries in the UN General Assembly to a four-year term on the UN Committee on the Elimination of All Forms of Discrimination Against Women (CEDAW).
