= Jacob Metzer =

Israeli economic historian

Jacob (Kobi) Metzer
- יעקב (קובי) מצר
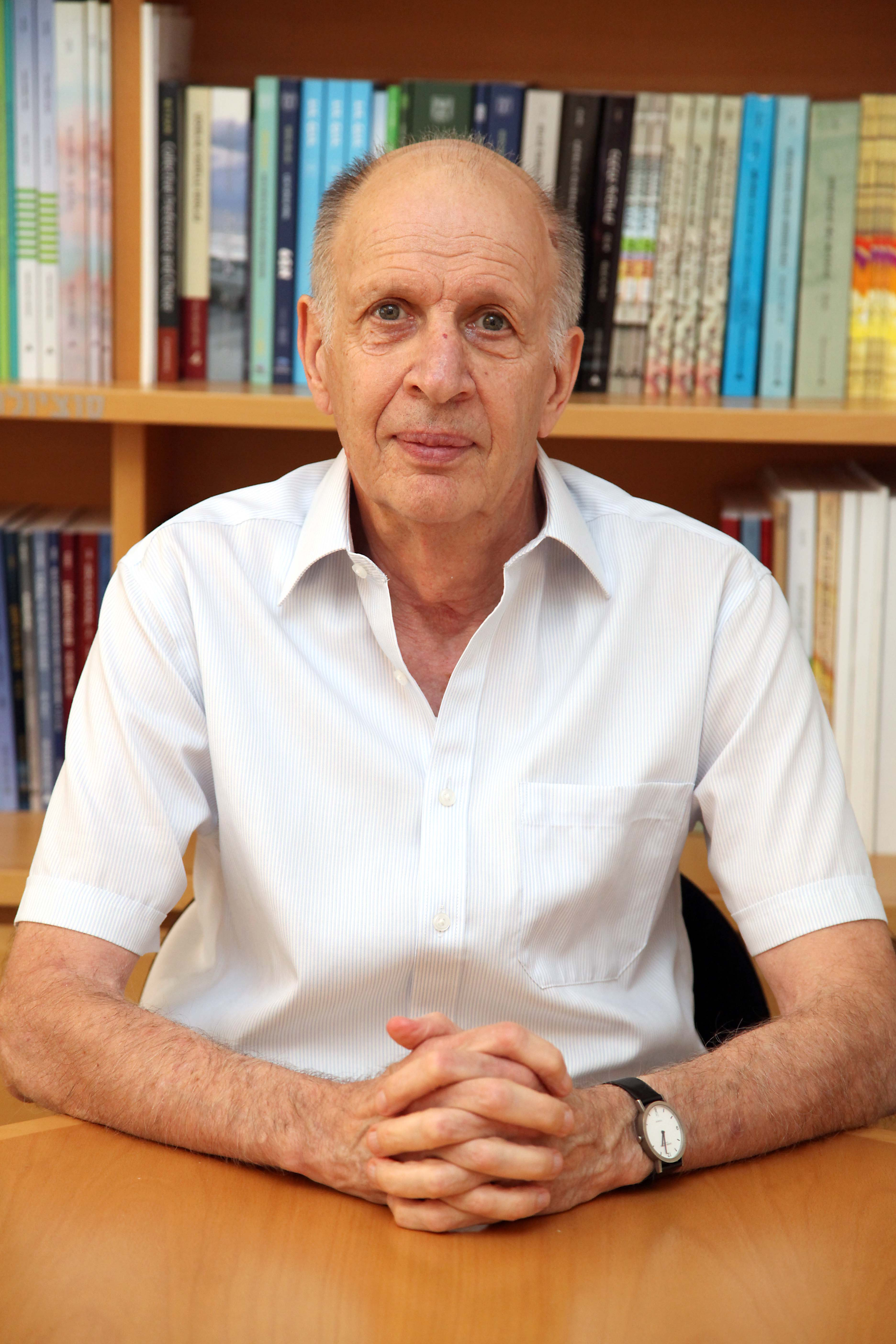
- Born: 1942 (age 83–84)
- Education: Hebrew University of Jerusalem (undergraduate degree in economics and history, 1967); University of Chicago (master's (1969) and doctorate (1972) in economics)
- Occupation: economic historian
- Known for: Alexander Brody Emeritus Professor of Economic History in the Department of Economics at the Hebrew University of Jerusalem; Eighth President of the Open University of Israel

Jacob (Kobi) Metzer (Hebrew: יעקב (קובי) מצר; born 1942) is an Israeli economic historian who is the Alexander Brody Emeritus Professor of Economic History in the Department of Economics at the Hebrew University of Jerusalem, and the eighth President of the Open University of Israel.

== Biography ==
Metzer completed his undergraduate degree in economics and history at the Hebrew University of Jerusalem in 1967, and received his master's (1969) and doctorate (1972) in economics from the University of Chicago. Metzer is an economic historian and a substantial part of his research has been devoted to the economy of Mandatory Palestine and Israel, and to economic aspects of ethno-nationality and settler societies.

Metzer was the Alexander Brody Chair in Economic History at the Hebrew University of Jerusalem from 1972 to 2010, Chair of the Department of Economics from 1994 to 2010, Dean of the Faculty of Sciences from 2009 to 2014, and since 2010 has been the Alexander Brody Emeritus Professor of Economic History in the Department of Economics.

In 2013 Metzer was appointed to serve as the eighth President of the Open University of Israel, replacing Professor Hagit Messer Yaron.

He was a Member of the Editorial Board of Explorations in Economic History from 1994 to 2004, and a Member of the Editorial Board of the Journal of Economic History from 1995 to 1998. Metzer was a member of the Executive Committee of the International Economic History Association from 1998 to 2006.

Metzer's salary in 2017 was NIS 90,990 per month.
