= Mordechai Rotenberg =

Israeli professor of social work and psychologist

- מרדכי רוטנברג
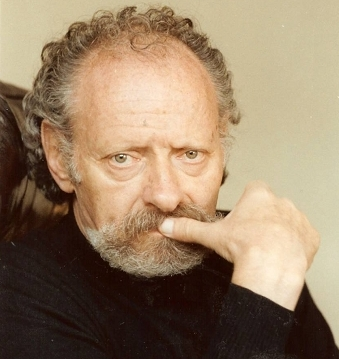
- Mordechai Rotenberg
- Born: 1932 (age 93–94); Breslau, Germany (today Wrocław, Poland)
- Occupations: Professor of social work; Psychologist
- Known for: Developing psychological theories based on Hasidic and Midrashic concepts
- Awards: Israel Prize for social work (2009)

Mordechai Rotenberg (Hebrew: מרדכי רוטנברג; born 1932) is an Israeli professor of social work at the Hebrew University of Jerusalem.

== Biography ==
Mordechai Rotenberg was born in Breslau, Germany (today Wrocław, Poland). His father was from Warsaw, descended from Rabbi Yitzchak Meir Alter, the founder of the Gur Hasidic sect. His father owned a publishing house in Breslau. In 1939, on the eve of World War II, the family immigrated to Palestine. Rotenberg's father opened a small printing press in Jerusalem. Rotenberg grew up in a Haredi household, with three brothers and a sister.

In 1960, he graduated from the Hebrew University with a BA in education and sociology from the School of Social Work. In 1962, he received his MSW from New York University. In 1969, he was awarded a Ph.D. in social welfare and social psychology at University of California, Berkeley.

In 1970, Rotenberg joined the faculty of the Hebrew University of Jerusalem, becoming a full professor in 1980. He founded a new sub-discipline in psychology and religion. He is the author of ten books, which have been translated into English, French, Portuguese and Japanese. Rotenberg has taught at University of Pennsylvania, University of California, Berkeley, the Jewish Theological Seminary, City University of New York and Yeshiva University.

== Clinical approach ==
Rotenberg has developed innovative theories based on psychological interpretations of Hasidic and Midrashic concepts. He describes his approach as "re-biography", i.e., "rereading one's biography so it becomes possible to live with the text." In an interview with Haaretz newspaper he said: "All of life is a text, and I am proposing a new term - recomposition, rewriting the melody of life. You do not have to erase the past, but it can be re-composed, and to that end I cite examples from the Gemara."

=== Tzimtzum paradigm ===
Rotenberg has adopted the Kabbalistic-Hasidic tzimtzum paradigm, which he believes has significant implications for clinical therapy. According to this paradigm, God's "self-contraction" to vacate space for the world serves as a model for human behavior and interaction. The tzimtzum model promotes a unique community-centric approach which contrasts starkly with the language of Western psychology.

== Awards ==
In 2009, Rotenberg was awarded the Israel Prize for social work, in connection with his research in social welfare.

== Published works ==
- Damnation and Deviance: The Protestant Ethic and the Spirit of Failure
- Rewriting the Self: Psychotherapy and Midrash
- The Yetzer: A Kabbalistic Psychology of Eroticism and Human Sexuality
- Hasidic Psychology: Making Space for Others
- Creativity and Sexuality: A Kabbalistic Experience
- Between Rationality and Irrationality: The Jewish Psychotherapeutic System
- Dialogue With Deviance
- The Trance of Terror, Psycho-Religious FundaMentalism: Roots and Remedies
- Dia-logo Therapy: Psychonarration and PaRDeS
- Re-Biographing and Deviance: Psychotherapeutic Narrativism and the Midrash

== See also ==
- List of Israel Prize recipients
