= Naomi Chayen =

Biochemist

- Education: Hebrew University of Jerusalem; Brunel University London
- Known for: Innovations in protein crystallization methodology
- Scientific career
- Fields: Structural biology
- Workplaces: Imperial College London
- Thesis: Studies on stimulus-response coupling in smooth muscle (1983)

Naomi Chayen is a biochemist and structural biologist. She is a professor of Biomedical Sciences at Imperial College London, where she leads the Crystallization Group in Computational and Systems Medicine. She is best known for developing the microbatch method and inventing novel nucleants for protein crystallization which have been applied to high-throughput screening for rational drug design.

== Education and career ==
Chayen earned her first degree in pharmacy at the Hebrew University of Jerusalem. During her undergraduate studies, she visited the Kennedy Institute of Rheumatology to learn histochemistry. She subsequently pursued MSc and PhD research at the Kennedy Institute. In 1983, Chayen submitted her thesis on stimulus-response coupling in smooth muscle cells and received a PhD from Brunel University London.

Chayen began her first postdoctoral fellowship at Imperial College London, where she studied the biophysics of muscle proteins. When her grant was not renewed, she joined the lab of David Mervyn Blow to develop novel protein crystallization techniques. There, she began her influential work of utilizing phase diagrams to optimize conditions for crystal growth.

Currently, Chayen is a professor of Biomedical Sciences and head of the Crystallization Group in Computational and Systems Medicine at Imperial College London.

== Research ==
Chayen is best known for her invention of novel protein crystallization methods. In 1990, she first published a method of suspending droplets of protein solution and precipitant solutions in low-density paraffin oil to prevent evaporation during the microbatch crystallization process. The microbatch process can be suitable for membrane proteins, which are ordinarily difficult to crystallize. Chayen's method has since been applied towards the analysis of many biomolecules that are relevant to human diseases such as cancer, HIV, diabetes, and heart disease.

In addition to her work on microbatch methods, Chayen invented a novel gel-glass nucleant now known as "Naomi's Nucleant." Naomi's Nucleant has been used to crystallize more than 20 proteins, the most of any single nucleant. In 2015, she collaborated with Subrayal Reddy at University of Central Lancashire to develop the first non-protein nucleant, a semi-liquid molecularly imprinted polymer designed for high-throughput screening. The nucleant was commercialized as "Chayen Reddy MIP."

Chayen's current research interests include protein crystallization, structural biology, and structural genomics and proteomics.

== Awards and honors ==
Chayen holds nine patents and has launched several commercial products for protein crystallization, such as "Chayen Reddy MIP" and "Naomi's nucleant." In addition, she has won the following awards:

- Women of Outstanding Achievement for Innovation and Entrepreneurship Commendation, WISE Campaign (2012)
- Investigator of the Year, Select Biosciences Life Sciences Awards (2011)
- Innovator of the Year, CWT everywoman in Technology Awards (2011)

Chayen was the Sterling Drug Visiting Professor of Pharmacology at Yale School of Medicine in 2009. She was formerly the president of the International Organization for Biological Crystallization.
