= Sarah Spiegel (biologist) =

American biologist

- Education: BSc., Hebrew University of Jerusalem; PhD., Weizmann Institute of Science
- Known for: Discovery of sphingosine-1-phosphate molecule
- Scientific career
- Fields: Cell biology, biochemistry
- Workplaces: Virginia Commonwealth University; VCU Massey Cancer Center

Sarah Spiegel is professor and chair of the Department of Biochemistry and Molecular Biology at Virginia Commonwealth University (VCU). In the mid-1990s she discovered the sphingosine-1-phosphate (S1P) molecule, a lipid which has been identified as a signaler for the spread of cancer, inflammation, and cardiovascular disease. Her research continues to focus on S1P.

== Education ==
Sarah Spiegel received her Bachelor of Science degree in chemistry and biochemistry at the Hebrew University of Jerusalem in 1974. She did graduate work in biochemistry under Professor Meir Wilchek at the Weizmann Institute of Science in Rehovot, Israel, where she earned her PhD in biochemistry in 1983, before relocating to the United States.

== Career ==
Spiegel did a postdoctoral fellowship at the Membrane Biochemistry Section at the National Institute of Neurological Disorders and Stroke at the National Institutes of Health in Bethesda, Maryland, from 1984 to 1986. She then moved to Georgetown University School of Medicine to serve as assistant professor in the Department of Biochemistry and Molecular Biology from 1987 to 1992, and associate professor and director of the graduate program in biochemistry and molecular biology from 1992 to 1996. This was followed by a full professorship in biochemistry and molecular biology at the University Medical School from 1996 to 2001.

Spiegel became professor and chair of the Department of Biochemistry at Virginia Commonwealth University in 2002, a position she holds to this day. Since 2005, she has also served as director of the Cancer Cell Biology Program at the VCU Massey Cancer Center.

== S1P research ==
Spiegel is credited with the discovery of the sphingosine-1-phosphate (S1P) molecule in the mid-1990s. This molecule has been identified as a signaler in the spread of cancer, inflammation, and cardiovascular disease. In 2013 Spiegel and Santiago Lima reported the discovery of the atomic structure of the enzyme sphingosine kinase 1, which produces the S1P molecule.

Spiegel's research has been continually funded for a period of nearly 20 years by grants from the National Institutes of Health. In 2003 she was awarded the National Institutes of Health MERIT Award for further research on S1P.

She is a frequent presenter at national and international conferences.

== Other activities ==
Since 2000, she has served on the editorial boards of the Journal of Biological Chemistry, Glycoconjugate Journal, Biochimica et Biophysica Acta, and Signal Transduction.

== Awards and honors ==
- 2007: VCU Women in Science, Dentistry and Medicine Professional Achievement Award
- 2007: University Distinguished Scholarship Award
- 2008: Virginia's Outstanding Scientist
- 2009 Avanti Award in Lipids
- 2021 Selected as an American Society for Biochemistry and Molecular Biology fellow

== Selected bibliography ==
=== Books ===
- Lipids in Apostosis. Elsevier. 2002. OCLC 51667285. (with T. Levade and Yusuf A. Hannun)

=== Articles ===
- Kunkel, Gregory T.; Maceyka, Michael; Milstien, Sheldon; Spiegel, Sarah (2013). "Targeting the sphingosine-1-phosphate axis in cancer, inflammation and beyond". Nature Reviews Drug Discovery. 12 (9): 688–702. doi:10.1038/nrd4099. PMC 3908769. PMID 23954895.
- Masayuki Nagahashi; et al. (1 February 2012). "Sphingosine-1-phosphate produced by sphingosine kinase 1 promotes breast cancer progression by stimulating angiogenesis and lymphangiogenesis". Cancer Research. 72 (3): 726–735. doi:10.1158/0008-5472.can-11-2167. PMC 3289261. PMID 22298596.
- Sergio E. Alvarez; et al. (24 June 2010). "Sphingosine-1-phosphate is a missing cofactor for the E3 ubiquitin ligase TRAF2". Nature. 465 (7301): 1084–1088. Bibcode:2010Natur.465.1084A. doi:10.1038/nature09128. PMC 2946785. PMID 20577214.
- Spiegel, Sarah; Milstien, Sheldon (May 2003). "Sphingosine-1-phosphate: an enigmatic signalling lipid". Nature Reviews Molecular Cell Biology. 4 (5): 397–407. doi:10.1038/nrm1103. PMID 12728273. S2CID 22622224.
- Catherine H. Liu; et al. (April 1999). "Ligand-induced Trafficking of the Sphingosine-1-phosphate Receptor EDG-1". Molecular Biology of the Cell. 10 (4): 1179–1190. doi:10.1091/mbc.10.4.1179. PMC 25247. PMID 10198065.
- Spiegel, Sarah; Wilchek, Meir (September 1983). "Grafting of triggering site onto lymphocytes; distribution of grafted dinitrophenyl groups on cell surface glycoproteins and glycolipids". Molecular and Cellular Biochemistry. 55 (2): 183–190. doi:10.1007/bf00673712. PMID 6633515. S2CID 21097211.
