= Esther Farbstein =

Israeli historian of the Holocaust

- אסתר פרבשטיין
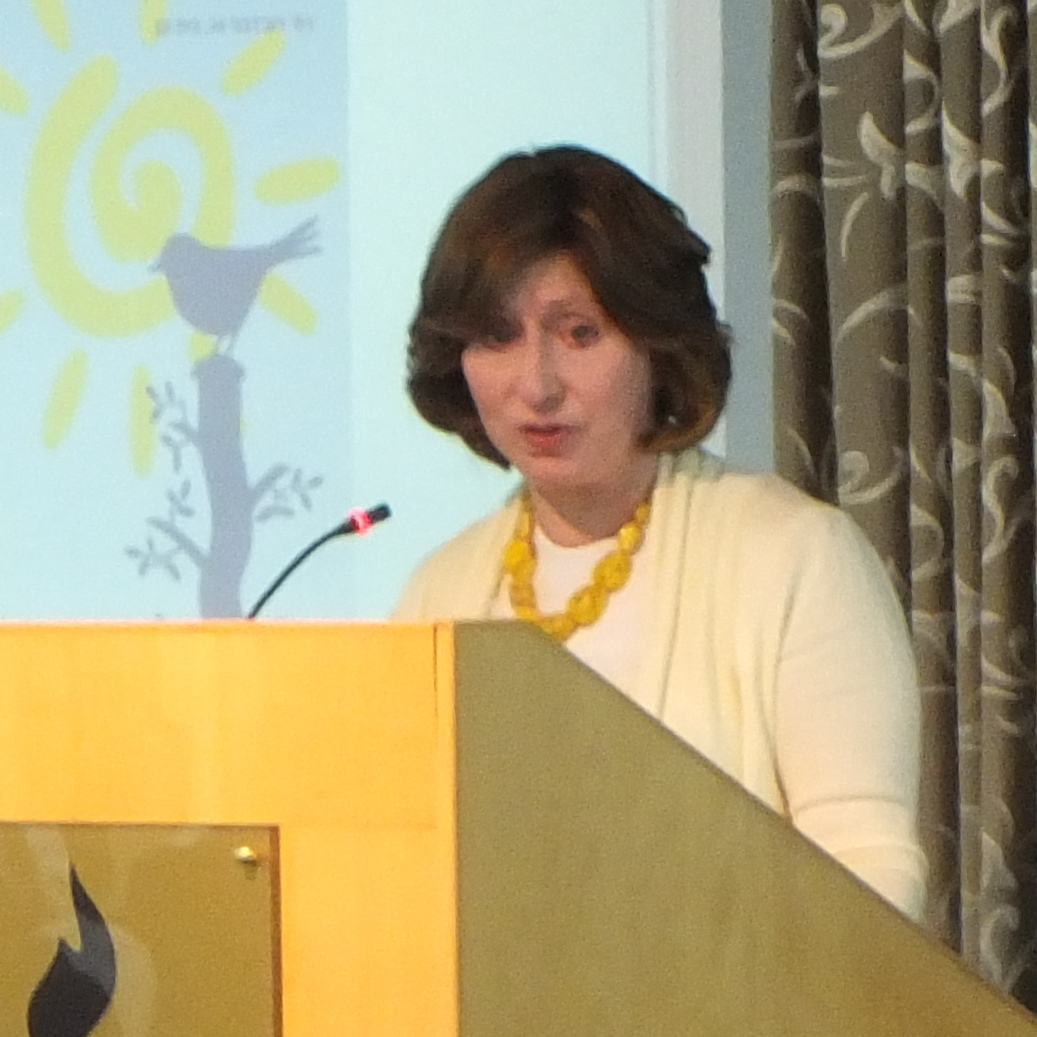
- Farbstein in 2017
- Born: Esther Heine; 1946 (age 79–80); Jerusalem
- Occupations: Historian, researcher, author, lecturer
- Known for: Holocaust scholarship
- Spouse: Rabbi Moshe Mordechai Farbstein
- Children: 7
- Parent: Rabbi Yehuda Leib Heine

Academic background
- Education: M.A. Contemporary Jewry, Hebrew University of Jerusalem, 1984
- Thesis: "The Rescue of Hasidic Leaders in the Holocaust Era" (1984)
- Academic advisor: Yehuda Bauer

Academic work
- Notable works: Hidden in Thunder: Perspectives on Faith, Halachah and Leadership During the Holocaust (2007); Hidden in the Heights: Orthodox Jewry in Hungary During the Holocaust (2014)

Esther Farbstein (Hebrew: אסתר פרבשטיין; born 1946) is an Israeli historian, researcher, author, and lecturer. Considered the leading Haredi (ultra-Orthodox) scholar of the Holocaust, she focuses on the spiritual responses of Jews to Nazi persecution. She has introduced new sources for academic research on the Holocaust, and has also shepherded the incorporation of Holocaust education in Haredi girls schools. In 1994, she founded and became head of the Center for Holocaust Studies at Michlalah-Jerusalem Collegein Bayit Vegan, Jerusalem. She is the author of numerous books, articles, and monographs in Hebrew and English.

== Early life and education ==
Esther Heine was born into a Gerrer Hasidic family in Jerusalem in 1946. The daughter of Rabbi Yehuda Leib Heine, she is a great-granddaughter of the fourth Rebbe of the Ger Hasidic dynasty, Rabbi Avraham Mordechai Alter, known as the Imrei Emes. Growing up in the years right after World War II, her childhood home often provided lodging for Holocaust survivors who had nowhere else to stay.

She completed her undergraduate studies at Bar-Ilan University and earned a master's degree in Contemporary Jewry from Hebrew University of Jerusalem. She wrote her 1984 master's thesis under the direction of Israeli Holocaust scholar Yehuda Bauer, on the subject "The Rescue of Hasidic Leaders in the Holocaust Era".

She worked for many years as a master teacher at the Horeb Girls School in Jerusalem. In 1994, she founded the Center for Holocaust Studies at Michlalah–Jerusalem College, becoming its head.

== Holocaust scholarship ==
Farbstein is considered the leading Haredi scholar of the Holocaust. Her academic approach, which firmly relies on historical detail and documentation, stands in contrast to the decades-long reliance of the Haredi world on oral traditions, myths, and hagiography. Farbstein says: "When I teach Holocaust history in my community, I say, 'Do not study without sources, without the hard facts'. There is no room for drama here. If I give a lecture and I see that the audience is crying, I think the lecture has failed".

Farbstein's research focuses on the spiritual response of Jews to Nazi persecution. Spiritual resistance—such as continuing mitzvah observance in the ghettos and concentration camps, trying to retain one's humanity even while being treated as subhuman, and submitting questions in Jewish law (she'ilot) on life and death issues—has been largely ignored by secular scholars in favor of the study of physical resistance.

Farbstein shows a willingness to challenge the conclusions of both secular and religious historians in her research. An example of the former is her analysis of the speech given by Rabbi Mordechai of Bilgoray before he left Hungary with the Belzer Rebbe. Secular researchers have concluded that this speech proved that rabbis abandoned their communities in the face of the Nazi threat, or at the least tried to mislead them about the impending danger. Farbstein promotes a third option: that the rabbinical leaders themselves were unaware of the great danger hanging over European Jewry. An example of the latter is a widely publicized story of 93 Bais Yaakov students in the Kraków Ghetto who committed mass suicide rather than be defiled by their German captors, outlining their decision in a letter dated 11 August 1942. While this story has been repeated in public gatherings in Israel and taught in religious schools as an example of Jewish martyrdom, Farbstein examined the authenticity of the documentation and the weight of evidence to the contrary and concluded that "both the story and the letter are literary-pedagogic creations rather than historical sources". Judith Kalik describes Farbstein's approach as "innovative analysis of the sources and … sharp criticism of the existing studies". Haredi author Jonathan Rosenblum calls Farbstein "a fighting historian".

Farbstein has also discovered new sources for academic research on the Holocaust. One new avenue is rabbinic works in which the author writes about his own Holocaust experience in the preface. Since the sefer itself does not relate to the Holocaust, previous Holocaust researchers ignored it. Together with Dr. Nathan Cohen of Bar-Ilan University, Farbstein located more than 100 rabbinical works which include personal Holocaust accounts in the preface, and entered them into a database called the Rabbis' Memoirs Project. This database was released to the public on CD in January 2007.

In the absence of documentation, Farbstein pursued new sources to corroborate a story printed by Rabbi Zvi Hirsch Meisels about him blowing shofar on Rosh Hashana in Auschwitz for a group of 1,400 boys and young men sentenced to be gassed the following day. She asked each of her lecture audiences over a period of years if they knew anyone who had heard that shofar-blowing. In so doing, she located ten eyewitnesses who verified the incident.

== Impact on Holocaust education in Haredi schools ==
I felt that the way to open the study of the Holocaust was to find sources that would be acceptable to the Haredi public, but also reliable from a research standpoint; to choose and classify them; and, of course, to teach them against the background of the orderly study of history.

— Esther Farbstein

Farbstein has been a driving force behind the integration of Holocaust studies into the curriculum of religious girls schools. She conducts teacher-training seminars in the Bais Yaakov school system, some Hasidic school systems such as Vizhnitz and Belz, and also the Yad Vashem school for teachers of the Holocaust. She produces study modules and short documentary films to aid in Holocaust education.

For decades, this subject was not taught in Haredi schools, in large part due to the community's opposition to the Zionist perspective that "monopolized the documentation", criticized European rabbis for encouraging their flocks to remain in Europe instead of emigrating to Palestine, and claimed the victims went to their deaths "like sheep to the slaughter". "Without a doubt, in the early decades, there was a fear that if they dealt with the Holocaust, many questions would arise", Farbstein asserts. She believes her academic approach takes Holocaust studies out of the realm of the "emotional", and into "orderly historical knowledge".

In 2012, Farbstein created an online tournament to test Israeli high school students on their knowledge of Holocaust events. The first tournament was based on the history of the Warsaw Ghetto.

Farbstein frequently lectures on Holocaust topics in international conferences and seminars for the public.

== Personal life ==
She is married to Rabbi Moshe Mordechai Farbstein, rosh yeshiva (dean) of the Hebron Yeshiva. The couple has seven children.

== Bibliography ==
=== Books ===
Hebrew

- בסתר רעם: הלכה, הגות ומנהיגות בימי השואה [Hidden in Thunder: Perspectives on Faith, Halachah and Leadership During the Holocaust] (in Hebrew). Mossad HaRav Kook. 2002. ISBN 9789657265079.
- זיכרון בספר - השואה במבואות לספרות הרבנית [Memory in Book: The Holocaust in Prefaces to Rabbinic Literature] (in Hebrew). Reuven Mass. 2008. (co-authored with Asaf Yedidya and Nathan Cohen)
- בסתר המדרגה: היהדות האורתודוקסית בהונגריה נוכח השואה [Hidden in the Heights: Orthodox Jewry in Hungary During the Holocaust]. Mossad HaRav Kook. 2013.

English

- Hidden in Thunder; Hidden in Thunder: Perspectives on Faith, Halachah and Leadership During the Holocaust. Feldheim. 2007. ISBN 9789657265055. (2 vol.)
- The Forgotten Memoirs: Moving Personal Accounts from Rabbis who Survived the Holocaust. Shaar Press. 2011. ISBN 9781422611067.
- Hidden in the Heights: Orthodox Jewry in Hungary During the Holocaust. Mossad HaRav Kook. 2014. ISBN 9789657265239. (2 vol.)

=== Edited works ===
- שטיין, חיים (2015). מטלז עד טלז - יומנו של הרב חיים שטיין [From Telz to Telz: The diary of Rabbi Chaim Stein] (in Hebrew). ISBN 9789659234714.
- Kahlenberg, Moses (2005). Yedei Moshe: Derashot beMaḥaneh Hesder beTsorfat biYmei haShoah [The Hands of Moses: Sermons in the Secret Camp in France During the Holocaust] (in Hebrew). Merkaz leḤeker haShoah.

=== Monographs ===
- שומרים על קשר: Maintaining the Bond in the Concentration Camps. Michlalah–Jerusalem College. 2003.
- פתח ההצלה מטנג'יר: רני רייכמן לעזרת יהודי אירופה [Rescue from Tangier: Rene Reichman Comes to the Aid of European Jewry] (in Hebrew). Mossad HaRav Kook. 2017. ISBN 9789657265321.

=== Selected articles in English ===
- "Diaries and Memoirs as a Historical Source – The Diary and Memoir of a Rabbi at the 'Konin House of Bondage'" (PDF). Yad Vashem Studies. XXVI: 87–128. 1998.
- "Rabbis in the Holocaust: Captains of a Sinking Ship". Nativ. 16 (3–4). June 2004. Archived from the original on 30 January 2024.
- Farbstein, Ester (2005). "A Close-Up View of a Judenrat: The memoirs of Pnina Weiss—wife of a member of the first Judenrat in Warsaw". Yad Vashem Studies: 61–99.
- Farbstein, Ester (2007). "'Steady Until Sunset': Sermons in a French Internment Camp during the Holocaust". Modern Judaism: 1–28.
- Farbstein, Esther (May 2007). "Sermons Speak History: Rabbinic Dilemmas in Internment between Metz and Auschwitz". Modern Judaism. 27 (2): 146–172. doi:10.1093/mj/kjm007. JSTOR 30130924.
