= Israel Atomic Energy Commission =

Government Body in Israel

The Israel Atomic Energy Commission (IAEC; Hebrew: הוועדה לאנרגיה אטומית) is the governmental authority responsible for the State of Israel's activities in the nuclear field. It is a front organization for the highly classified organization that headquarters the Israeli nuclear weapons program, the Scientific Authority (Hebrew: מינהל מדעי, romanized: Minhal Madaii).

The current head of the commission is General Moshe Edri.

== History ==
The establishment of the Israel Atomic Energy Commission was announced on 13 June 1952 by Prime Minister David Ben-Gurion. The prime minister appointed Professor Ernst David Bergmann to be its first director-general. Initially the committee was housed in temporary structures near Rehovot and is now located in Ramat Aviv. It oversaw the establishment of the Soreq Nuclear Research Center, the construction of which started in 1958 and the Negev Nuclear Research Center that began construction in late 1959. In 1966, the dormant IAEC was reestablished as a front organization for the highly classified organization that headquarters the Israeli nuclear weapons program, the Scientific Authority (Hebrew: מינהל מדיי, romanized: Minhal Madaii). It would control the two main hubs of weapons development, KAMAG at the Negev center in charge of fissile material production, and the Weapons Development Authority (now Rafael Advanced Defense Systems) in charge of weaponization.

== Functions ==
The IAEC advises the government of Israel in areas of nuclear policy and in setting priorities in nuclear research and development. The commission implements governmental policies and represents Israel in international organizations in the nuclear field, such as the International Atomic Energy Agency. The IAEC maintains relationships with relevant national authorities of other countries.

== See also ==
- Nuclear weapons of Israel
- Nuclear energy in Israel
