= Zadok (disambiguation) =

Zadok was a high priest of the Israelites in Jerusalem during the reigns of David and Solomon.

Zadok may also refer to:

== Given name ==
- The founder of the Sadducees, the priestly sect during the time of the Second Temple
- Zadok, the father of Jerusha, who was the mother of King Jotham of Judah
- Zadok, a Pharisee and co-founder of the Zealots
- Zadok, son of Azor, appearing in the Genealogy of Jesus
- Zadok HaKohen Rabinowitz, an important 19th Century Hasidic rabbi.
- Zadok II, grandson of Azariah
- Zadoc P. Beach, American politician
- Zadoc Kahn (1839–1905), French rabbi
- Zadok Yohanna, a Nigerian professional footballer

== Surname ==
- Erez Zadok is the current maintainer of the Berkeley Automounter
- Charles Zadok (1897–1984), American businessman, art collector and patron
- Haim Yosef Zadok (1913–2002), Israeli jurist and politician
- Rabbi Zadok, tanna of the 1st-century CE
- Rachel Zadok, South-African writer currently based in London, England
- Yehuda Zadok (born 1958), Israeli Olympic runner
- Yoram Zadok, Israeli composer
- Moshe Tzadok
- Osnat Tzadok

== Arts, entertainment, and media ==
=== Fictional entities ===
- Zadok Allen, a character in the H. P. Lovecraft novella The Shadow over Innsmouth

=== Music ===
- Zadok the Priest, an 18th-century coronation anthem by Handel

== Companies ==
- Zadok, a manufacturer of music soft and hardware (Zadok Audio & Media Products), see the List of synthesizer manufacturers
- Haim Zadok & Co., a Tel Aviv law firm

== See also ==
- Zadoc (given name) for a list of people with this name and other variants
- Tzadik
