= Prime Minister of Israel =

Head of government

- רֹאשׁ הַמֶּמְשָׁלָה (Hebrew); رئيس الحكومة (Arabic)
- Emblem of Israel (Note: Version of emblem of Israel used by the Prime Minister's Office website.)

- Prime Ministerial Standard (Note: Flags of the Israel Defense Forces)

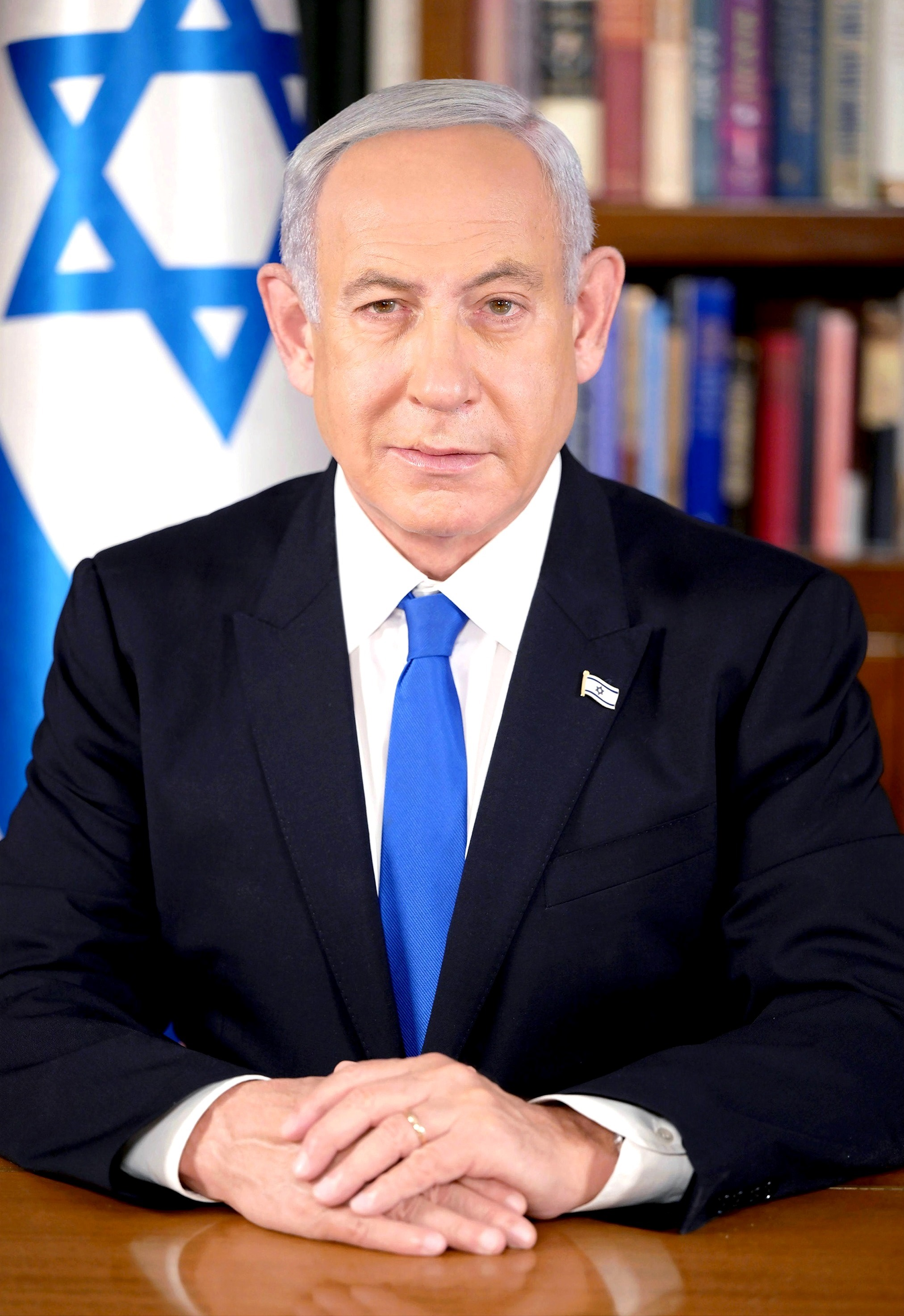
- Incumbent; Benjamin Netanyahu (caretaker) since 29 December 2022 (Note: Caretaker since 27 October 2026)
- Prime Minister's Office
- Style: His Excellency
- Type: Head of government
- Residence: Beit Aghion, Jerusalem
- Nominator: President
- Appointer: Knesset
- Term length: Four years, renewable indefinitely
- Formation: 14 May 1948; 78 years ago
- First holder: David Ben-Gurion
- Salary: US$170,000 annually
- Website: pmo.gov.il

The prime minister of Israel (Hebrew: רֹאשׁ הַמֶּמְשָׁלָה, romanised: Rosh HaMemshala, lit. 'Head of the Government', Hebrew abbreviation: Hebrew: רה״מ, romanized: Raham; Arabic: رئيس الحكومة, romanised: Ra'īs al-Ḥukūma) is the head of government and chief executive of the State of Israel.

Israel is a parliamentary republic with a president as the head of state. The president's powers are largely ceremonial, while the prime minister holds the executive power. The official residence of the prime minister, Beit Aghion, is in Jerusalem. The current prime minister is Benjamin Netanyahu of Likud, the ninth person to hold the position (excluding caretakers).

Following an election, the president nominates a member of the Knesset to become prime minister after asking party leaders whom they support for the position. The first candidate the president nominates has 28 days to form a viable government that can command a majority in the Knesset. He then presents a government platform and must receive a vote of confidence from the Knesset to take office. In practice, the prime minister is usually the leader of the largest party in the governing coalition. Since it is all but impossible for one party to win a majority in the Knesset, all Israeli governments have been coalitions between two or more parties. Between 1996 and 2001, the prime minister was directly elected, separately from the Knesset.

== History ==
The office of Prime Minister came into existence on 14 May 1948, the date of the Declaration of the Establishment of the State of Israel, when the provisional government was created. David Ben-Gurion, leader of Mapai and head of the Jewish Agency, became Israel's first prime minister. The position became permanent on 8 March 1949, when the first government was formed. Ben-Gurion retained his role until late 1953, when he resigned to settle in the Kibbutz of Sde Boker. He was replaced by Moshe Sharett. However, Ben-Gurion returned in a little under two years to reclaim his position. He resigned for a second time in 1963, breaking away from Mapai to form Rafi. Levi Eshkol took over as head of Mapai and prime minister. He became the first prime minister to head the country under the banner of two parties when Mapai formed the Alignment with Ahdut HaAvoda in 1965. In 1968 he also became the only party leader to command an absolute majority in the Knesset, after Mapam and Rafi merged into the Alignment, giving it 63 seats in the 120-seat Knesset.

On 26 February 1969, Eshkol became the first prime minister to die in office. He was temporarily replaced by Yigal Allon, whose stint lasted less than a month, as the party persuaded Golda Meir to return to political life and become prime minister in March 1969. Meir was Israel's first woman prime minister, and the third in the world (after Sirimavo Bandaranaike and Indira Gandhi).

Meir resigned in 1974 after the Agranat Commission published its findings on the Yom Kippur War, even though it had absolved her of blame. Yitzhak Rabin took over, though he also resigned towards the end of the eighth Knesset's term following a series of scandals. Those included the suicide of Housing Minister Avraham Ofer after police began investigating allegations that he had used party funds illegally, and the affair involving Asher Yadlin (the governor-designate of the Bank of Israel), who was sentenced to five years in prison for having accepted bribes. Rabin's wife, Leah, was also found to have had an overseas bank account, which was illegal in Israel at the time.

Menachem Begin became the first right-wing prime minister when his Likud won the 1977 elections, and retained the post in the 1981 elections. He resigned in 1983 for health reasons, passing the reins of power to Yitzhak Shamir.

After the 1984 elections had proved inconclusive with neither the Alignment nor Likud able to form a government, a national unity government was formed with a rotating prime ministership – Shimon Peres took the first two years, and was replaced by Shamir midway through the Knesset term. Although the 1988 elections produced another national unity government, Shamir was able to take the role alone. Peres made an abortive bid to form a left-wing government in 1990, but failed, leaving Shamir in power until 1992. Rabin became prime minister for the second time when he led Labour to victory in the 1992 elections. After his assassination on 4 November 1995, Peres took over as prime minister.

=== Direct election ===
During the thirteenth Knesset (1992–1996) it was decided to hold a separate ballot for prime minister modelled after American presidential elections. This system was instituted in part because the Israeli electoral system makes it all but impossible for one party to win a majority. While only two parties—Mapai/Labour and Likud—had ever led governments, the large number of parties or factions in a typical Knesset usually prevents one party from winning the 61 seats needed for a majority.

In 1996, when the first such election took place, the outcome was a surprise win for Benjamin Netanyahu after election polls predicted that Peres was the winner. However, in the Knesset election held at the same time, Labour won more votes than any other party (27%). Thus Netanyahu, despite his theoretical position of power, needed the support of the religious parties to form a viable government.

Ultimately Netanyahu failed to hold the government together, and early elections for both prime minister and the Knesset were called in 1999. Although five candidates intended to run, the three representing minor parties (Benny Begin of Herut – The National Movement, Azmi Bishara of Balad, and Yitzhak Mordechai of the Centre Party) dropped out before election day, and Ehud Barak beat Netanyahu in the election. However, the new system again appeared to have failed; although Barak's One Israel alliance (an alliance of Labour, Gesher, and Meimad) won more votes than any other party in the Knesset election, they garnered only 26 seats, the lowest ever by a winning party or alliance. Barak needed to form a coalition with six smaller parties to form a government.

In early 2001, Barak resigned following the outbreak of the al-Aqsa Intifada. However, the government was not brought down, and only elections for prime minister were necessary. In the election itself, Ariel Sharon of Likud comfortably beat Barak, taking 62.4% of the vote. However, because Likud only had 21 seats in the Knesset, Sharon had to form a national unity government. Following Sharon's victory, it was decided to do away with separate elections for prime minister and return to the previous system.

=== 2003 onwards ===
The 2003 elections were carried out in the same manner as prior to 1996. Likud won 38 seats, the highest by a party for over a decade, and as party leader Sharon was duly appointed Prime Minister. However, towards the end of his term and largely as a result of the deep divisions within Likud over Israel's unilateral disengagement plan, Sharon broke away from his party to form Kadima, managing to maintain his position as prime minister and also becoming the first prime minister not to be a member of either Labour or Likud (or their predecessors). However, he suffered a stroke in January 2006, in the midst of election season, leading Ehud Olmert to become acting prime minister in the weeks leading to the elections. He was voted by the cabinet to be interim prime minister just after the 2006 elections, when Sharon had reached 100 days of incapacitation. He thus became Israel's third interim prime minister, only days before forming his own new government as the official Prime Minister of Israel.

In 2008, amid accusations of corruption and challenges from his own party, Olmert resigned. However, his successor Tzipi Livni was unable to form a coalition government. In the election in the following year, while Kadima won the most seats, it was the Likud leader Benjamin Netanyahu who was given the task of forming a government. He was able to do so, thus beginning his second term as Prime Minister of Israel.

In the 2013 election, the Likud Yisrael Beiteinu alliance emerged as the largest faction. After forming a coalition, Netanyahu secured his third prime ministership. In 2015, Netanyahu managed to stay in power. Multiple disagreements with his coalition members led to the 2019–2022 Israeli political crisis.

In 2021, Naftali Bennett became prime minister. He was succeeded in July 2022 by his coalition partner, Yair Lapid. In December 2022, Benjamin Netanyahu returned to the prime ministership, as a result of the previous month's election.

== Order of succession ==
If the prime minister dies in office, the cabinet chooses an interim prime minister to run the government until a new government is placed in power. Yigal Allon served as interim prime minister following Levi Eshkol's death, as did Shimon Peres following the assassination of Yitzhak Rabin.

According to Israeli law, if a prime minister is temporarily incapacitated rather than dies (as was the case following Ariel Sharon's stroke in early 2006), power is transferred to the acting prime minister, until the prime minister recovers (Ehud Olmert took over from Sharon), for up to 100 days. If the prime minister is declared permanently incapacitated, or that period expires, the president of Israel oversees the process of assembling a new governing coalition, and in the meantime the acting prime minister or other incumbent minister is appointed by the cabinet to serve as interim prime minister.

In the case of Sharon, elections were already due to occur within 100 days of the beginning of his coma; thus, the post-election coalition-building process pre-empted the emergency provisions for the selection of a new prime minister. Nevertheless, Olmert was appointed interim prime minister on 16 April 2006, after the elections, just days before he formed a government on 4 May 2006, becoming the official prime minister.

=== Acting, vice and deputy prime minister ===
Aside from the position of Acting Prime Minister, there are also vice prime ministers and deputy prime ministers.

=== Interim prime minister ===
The interim prime minister (Hebrew: ראש הממשלה בפועל, Rosh HaMemshala Ba-foal lit. "prime minister de facto") is appointed by the government if the incumbent is dead or permanently incapacitated, or if his tenure was ended due to a criminal conviction.

Israeli law distinguishes the terms acting prime minister (מלא מקום ראש הממשלה), filling in for the incumbent prime minister, temporarily, and acting in the incumbent's office, while the incumbent is in office, and an interim prime minister in office. Only if the incumbent prime minister becomes temporarily incapacitated will the acting prime minister act in the incumbent's office and will be standing in for him for up to 100 consecutive days, while the incumbent is in office. Legally, the "100 consecutive days" limit, in the language of the law, only stipulates that the incumbent then is deemed to be permanently incapacitated and that the limited time for an acting prime minister to act in the incumbent's office is over.

In 2006, Ehud Olmert, after standing in for Prime Minister Sharon for 100 consecutive days, as acting prime minister, did not automatically assume office as an interim prime minister. The government voted to appoint him, and in addition, he was also a member of prime minister's party, which enabled them to appoint him to the role.

Shimon Peres was the foreign minister when Prime Minister Yitzhak Rabin was assassinated, and was voted unanimously to assume office as an interim prime minister until a new Government would be placed in power (that he later formed by himself). Yigal Allon was also voted to be the interim prime minister after Prime Minister Levi Eshkol suddenly died and served until Golda Meir formed her government.

Both the interim and acting prime ministers' authorities are identical to those of a prime minister, with the exception of not having the authority to dissolve the Knesset.

=== Interim government ===
An 'interim government' (Hebrew: ממשלת מעבר, Memshelet Ma'avar lit. "transitional government") is the same government, having been changed in their legal status, after the death, resignation, permanent incapacitation, or criminal conviction of the prime minister, as well as after the prime minister's request to dissolve the Knesset (Israeli parliament) was published through the president's decree, or after it was defeated by a motion of no confidence (these actions are regarded by the law as "the Government shall be deemed to have resigned"), or after election and before the forming of a new government.

== Prime Minister's residence ==
Since 1974, the official residence of the prime minister is Beit Aghion, at the corner of Balfour and Smolenskin streets in Rehavia, Jerusalem.

== List of prime ministers of Israel ==
Tenure of office in years

== See also ==
- Beit Aghion
- Cabinet of Israel
- Prime Minister's Office (Israel)
