= Aaron He-Haver ben Yeshuah Alamani =

Rabbi Aaron He-Haver ben Yeshuah Alamani, also known as Alluf Zion, was a 12th-century rabbinical judge, physician, and poet. He was probably born in Jerusalem, at the end of the 11th century. In his later life he served as the chief rabbi of Alexandria. When Judah Halevi went to Alexandria in 1140, he stayed at Alamani's house and became friendly with him. More than thirty of Alamani's liturgical hymns and poems are now known, all of which were influenced by Hebrew poetry in Spain. His sons Yeshu'ah and Zadok were also poets.
