= Haim Yosef Zadok =

Israeli politician (1913–2002)

Haim Joseph Zadok
- חיים יוסף צדוק
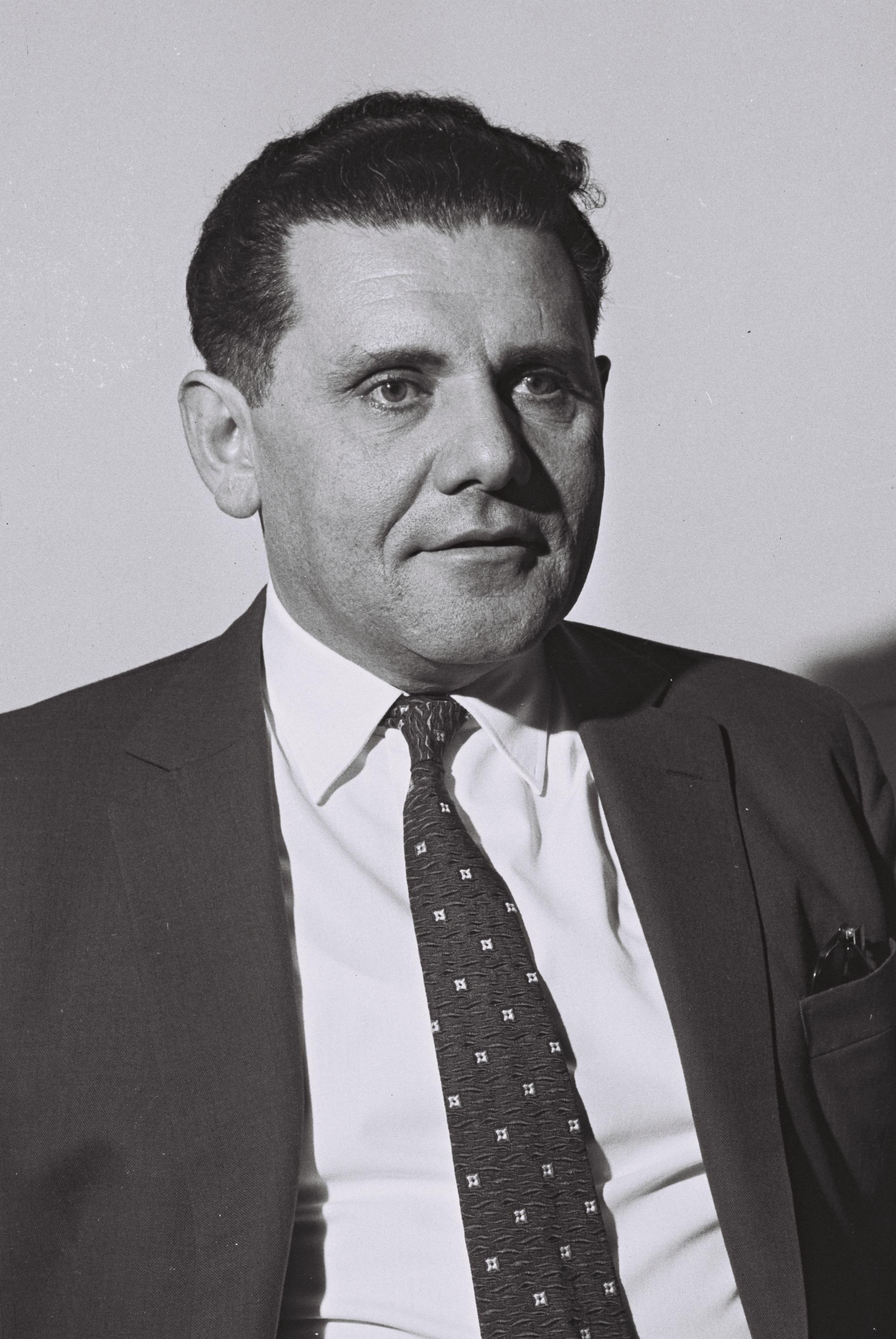

Ministerial roles
- 1965–1966: Minister of Development
- 1965–1966: Minister of Trade and Industry
- 1974: Minister of Religious Affairs
- 1974–1977: Minister of Justice
- 1977: Minister of Religious Affairs

Faction represented in the Knesset
- 1955–1965: Mapai
- 1965–1968: Alignment
- 1968–1969: Labor
- 1969–1978: Alignment

Personal details
- Born: 2 October 1913 Rava-Ruska, Austria-Hungary
- Died: 15 August 2002 (aged 88) Germany

Haim Joseph Zadok (Hebrew: חיים יוסף צדוק, romanized: Haim Yosef Zadok, born Haim Wilkenfeld; 2 October 1913 – 15 August 2002) was an Israeli jurist and politician.

== Early life ==
Zadok was born in 1913 in Rava-Ruska in Eastern Galicia in Austria-Hungary (now Ukraine). He studied philosophy and Jewish studies at the University of Warsaw. He was a member of the Gordonia youth movement in Poland and in the "Poale Zion Federation" Party.

In 1935, he immigrated to the British Mandate of Palestine and joined the Hagana and the Jewish Settlement Police. He studied law at the Hebrew University and was certified as a lawyer. During the 1948 Arab-Israeli War, he joined the IDF as a lawyer in the office of the Chief Military Prosecutor. In 1949, he joined the legislative department of the Ministry of Justice as a deputy of the Attorney-General, a position he held until 1952. While in this position, he drafted the Nazis and Nazi Collaborators (Punishment) Law.

== Career ==
In 1958 he was elected to the Knesset for Mapai. He was chairman of the Knesset House Committee, member of the Constitution, Law and Justice Committee, chairman of the Subcommittee on Constitutional Affairs, and member and chairman of the Foreign Affairs and Defense Committee. He was involved in the passing of the Law on Inquiry Commissions and the Basic Law: the Government, as well as in attempts to pass basic laws on Legislation and Civil Rights, sections of which were later passed in the Basic Laws on Human Dignity and Freedom and Freedom of Occupation. From 1965 to 1966 he was Minister of Industry and Trade.

In 1974 he became Minister of Justice, a position he held until the 1977 "Upheaval". When Meir Shamgar was made a Judge, Zadok appointed Aharon Barak as Attorney-General. With the assistance of these advisors, he passed the Basic Law: the Military and the Basic Law: the State Economy. Towards the end of his tenure at the Ministry of Justice, the translation of the Mandatory Criminal Law Ordinance was completed, and a new and integrated Penal Code was formulated. In the years 1974 to 1977 he was also the first secular Minister of Religious Affairs.

His tenure as Minister of Justice saw investigations of senior figures in the Israeli economy and Israeli politics, including the Yadlin affair, the Dollar Account affair and the suicide of Avraham Ofer. Zadok stood by Barak when he decided to prosecute, and refused calls from within the Labor Party to intervene in the investigation. He opposed the Israeli settlements but allowed them to reside in IDF camps, as a compromise. He was among the initiators of the sarcastically named "Brilliant trick", in which Prime Minister Yitzhak Rabin sacked the National Religious Party ministers, a move which eventually collapsed the government. In 1978, he retired from political life.

From 1978 to 1980 he was a lecturer at the Hebrew University of Jerusalem. In the 1980s and 1990s, alongside his work in his own private law office, Haim Zadok & Co., he devoted time to public activity. During the Kav 300 affair, he called for exercising the full rigor of the law with the Shin Bet, and protested the attempts to subvert the investigation and to grant pardons before the legal process had been completed. He also spoke out against the granting of a pardon to the members of the Jewish Underground and opposed the Israeli occupation of the West Bank and the Gaza Strip. He called for negotiations with the Palestinians and fought against the Law for the Direct Election of the Prime Minister. He also represented Time magazine when a libel suit was brought against it by Ariel Sharon concerning the Sabra and Shatila massacre.

He was a member of many public committees, including the Shamgar Commission, which considered the definition of the role and appointment of the Attorney-General, and he chaired committees that considered the regulation of police activity, the religious councils and the press. In 1991, he was one of the founders of the Israel Democracy Institute and served as the first chairman of its board of directors. In 1993, he was made president of the Press Council. He held liberal views that ruled out government intervention in the free press. In 1999 he was last on One Israel's list for the fifteenth Knesset and received the Solomon Bublick Award of the Hebrew University of Jerusalem.

Zadok died in 2002 of a heart attack during a trip to Germany. He was given the Israel Democracy Institute Award by the IDI. He was cited as one of the Labor Party's greatest leaders by Yossi Sarid and Binyamin Ben-Eliezer.

Streets are named after him in Netanya, Rehovot and Tel Aviv.

== Publications ==
- “Law and Government”, edited with Abraham Ben Naftali (1971) (in Hebrew)
- “Issues in Government in Israel” (1978) (in Hebrew)
