= Zadoc (given name) =

- Gender: Male

Origin
- Origin: Hebrew
- Meaning: just / righteous

Other names
- Related names: Zadok (alternate spelling),
- See also: Sadiq

Zadoc (alternatively Zadock, Zadok, Sadok, Sadaqat or Sadokat) is a given name (first name), originally from Hebrew, meaning "just" or "righteous". It was originally the name of several biblical figures, see Zadok (disambiguation).

== People with this name ==
=== Z ===
Zadoc

- Zadoc P. Beach (1861-??), American politician
- Zadoc Benedict, American businessman
- Zadoc Dederick, American inventor
- Zadoc Kahn (1839–1905), French rabbi and chief rabbi of France
- Zadoc Long, father of John Davis Long and namesake of the Zadoc Long Free Library, Buckfield, Maine
- Zadoc L. Weatherford (1888–1983), American politician

Zadok

- Zadok, Hebrew High Priest of King David and King Solomon
- Zadok Amani, 12th-century Jewish liturgical poet
- Zadok Ben-David (born 1949), Israeli artist
- Zadok Casey (1796–1862), American politician
- Zadok Cramer (1773–1813), American author and publisher
- Zadok Domnitz (born 1933), Israeli chess player
- Zadok HaKohen (1823–1900), Polish rabbi
- Zadok Magruder (1729–1811), American farmer and patriot
- Zadok Malka (born 1964), Israeli football player
- Zadok Zarfati, birth name of Tzedi Tzarfati

Zadock

- Selwyn Zadock Bowman, American attorney and politician
- Zadock Cook (1769–1863), American politician
- Zadock Pratt (1790–1871), American tanner and politician
  - Zadock Pratt House, Prattsville, New York
- Zadock Taft, namesake of the Zadock Taft House, Uxbridge, Massachusetts
- Zadock Thompson (1796–1856), American naturalist, professor, and Episcopal priest
- Zadock Woods, one of the Old Three Hundred land grantees in Texas

== See also ==
- Tzadik, the Jewish religious title, and the derived first names
- Zadock, Missouri
