= Elisheva Barak-Ussoskin =

Israeli judge (1936–2024)

- אלישבע ברק-אוסוסקין
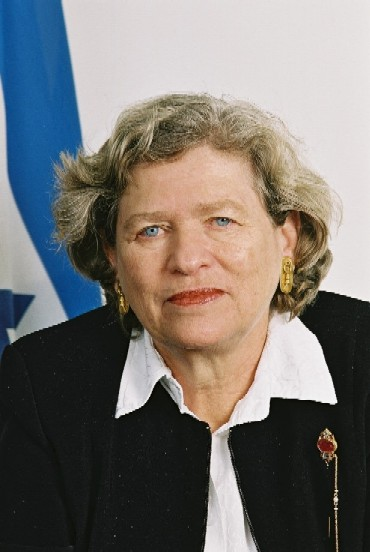
- Barak-Ussoskin (c. 2010s)

Vice President of the National Labor Court
- In office November 2000 – October 2006
- Appointed by: Aharon Barak

Personal details
- Born: Elika Josephina Ussoskin; 13 October 1936 Bucharest, Romania
- Died: 9 December 2024 (aged 88) Israel
- Spouse: Aharon Barak (m. 1957)
- Children: 4
- Education: M.Sc., zoology, genetics, and chemistry, Hebrew University of Jerusalem (1963); LL.B., Hebrew University of Jerusalem (1977)

Elisheva Barak-Ussoskin (Hebrew: אלישבע ברק-אוסוסקין; 13 October 1936 – 9 December 2024) was an Israeli judge. She sat on the Regional Labor Courts in Jerusalem and Beersheba from 1990 to 1995, and served as judge on the National Labor Court from 1995 to 2006. She also served as Vice President of the National Labor Court. Her rulings on labor law and labor relations were said to further the rights of workers more than any other Israeli judge. She was the wife of Aharon Barak, former President of the Supreme Court of Israel.

== Biography ==
Elika Josephina Ussoskin (later Barak) was born in Bucharest, Kingdom of Romania on 13 October 1936. Her parents were Moissei Moshe Ussoskin, an accountant, and Marrusia Miriam Griner, also an accountant and department store manager. She was an only child. Her father served as director of the American Jewish Joint Distribution Committee in the Balkans and was later director-general of Keren Hayesod — United Israel Appeal. He was arrested in 1940 and the family fled to Palestine after his release, arriving in February 1941.

The family settled in Jerusalem, where she studied at Gymnasia Rehavia from 1942 to 1950. She attended the Beit Ha-kerem High School in Jerusalem, graduating in 1954. She completed her compulsory service in the Israel Defense Forces from 1954 to 1956, attaining the rank of sergeant.

She married Aharon Barak, whom she had met while both were attending Beit Ha-kerem High School, in September 1957. Barak went on to serve as Attorney General of Israel (1975–78), Justice on the Supreme Court of Israel (1978–95), and President of the Supreme Court of Israel (1995–2006). The couple has three daughters and one son, all of whom graduated from law school.

Barak-Ussoskin undertook graduate studies at the Hebrew University of Jerusalem from 1956 to 1963, graduating with an M.Sc. in zoology, genetics, and chemistry. During her university career, she took two years of psychology and additional coursework in education. She also worked as a human genetics research assistant and as a teaching assistant in genetics.

From 1973 to 1977, she studied law at the Hebrew University of Jerusalem, receiving her LL.B. in 1977.

Barak-Ussoskin died on 9 December 2024, at the age of 88.

== Legal career ==
Barak-Ussoskin clerked for the office of the president of the Supreme Court of Israel, Yoel Sussman, and for the Jerusalem District Attorney's office, between 1977 and 1978. She passed the Israeli bar in 1978, and worked as a legal assistant to three different presidents of the Supreme Court from 1978 to 1987. She became Registrar of the Regional Labor Court in Jerusalem in 1987, and in 1990, was appointed a Judge in the Regional Labor Courts in Jerusalem and in Beersheba. In 1995, she advanced to a judgeship in the National Labor Court, and in November 2000 became vice president of that court as well. She retired in October 2006.

== Notable decisions ==
Barak-Ussoskin came to the National Labor Court at a time when workers' rights and the bargaining power of unions were weakening. She was remembered for "going farther than any other Israeli judge to advance and strengthen the rights of workers". Among her decisions:

- Injuries sustained by employees who work at home are to be classified as work accidents. This ruling was later extended to injuries sustained by employees engaged in unofficial company events, such as "staff-consolidation days" and "happy-days".
- A manpower agency is considered the employer of its temporary workers, and must ensure continuity in the workplace and the workers' social rights.
- Pension payments are designed to help pensioners maintain the same standard of living that they had when they were working, not just protect them from penury.
- An employer cannot act in bad faith either toward a prospective hire or a hired worker.
- Employees and workforces are not the property of the employer, so an employer is not allowed to transfer his employees to another employer.

A widely reported decision in April 1993 concerned a suit brought by a former editor of The Jerusalem Post. Thirty journalists walked out of the company when a new publisher took over and reportedly demanded that the journalists write articles with a certain political viewpoint. One of the walkouts, Joanna Yehiel, sued for severance pay even though she had not been fired. Barak-Ussoskin ruled in the plaintiff's favor, disallowing the publisher's right to dictate to his employees. Afterward Barak-Ussoskin wrote an extensive analysis about the decision, "Whose Newspaper Is It: Journalist-Publisher Relations – Judgment in the Case of Joanna Yehiel vs. The Palestine Post Ltd.", published in November 1993 issue of Qesher, a publication of the journalism studies program at Tel Aviv University.

=== Controversy ===
Allegations of nepotism dogged Barak-Ussoskin's career. SOS Israel notes that she was given a clerkship in the office of the Attorney General of Israel at the same time that her husband, Aharon Barak, was the Attorney General. She moved up to a legal assistant position in the Supreme Court at the same time that her husband was a Supreme Court justice. She was appointed judge of the National Labor Court by her husband, reportedly over the objections of the president of the labor court. Israel Minister of Justice David Libai stated to a reporter that the latter appointment had been based solely on merit rather than "family favoritism". However, Libai advised "that to avoid claims of 'discrimination or preference', the situation of appointment of two spouses as judges should be avoided in the future".

Barak-Ussoskin was cited for her slowness in completing her caseload. Some cases sat on her desk for many years without resolution. With the announcement of her retirement, eleven cases on which she had prepared a draft ruling were sent to other judges for completion.

== See also ==
- Women of Israel
- Israeli law
