= Dollar Account affair =

Israeli political scandal

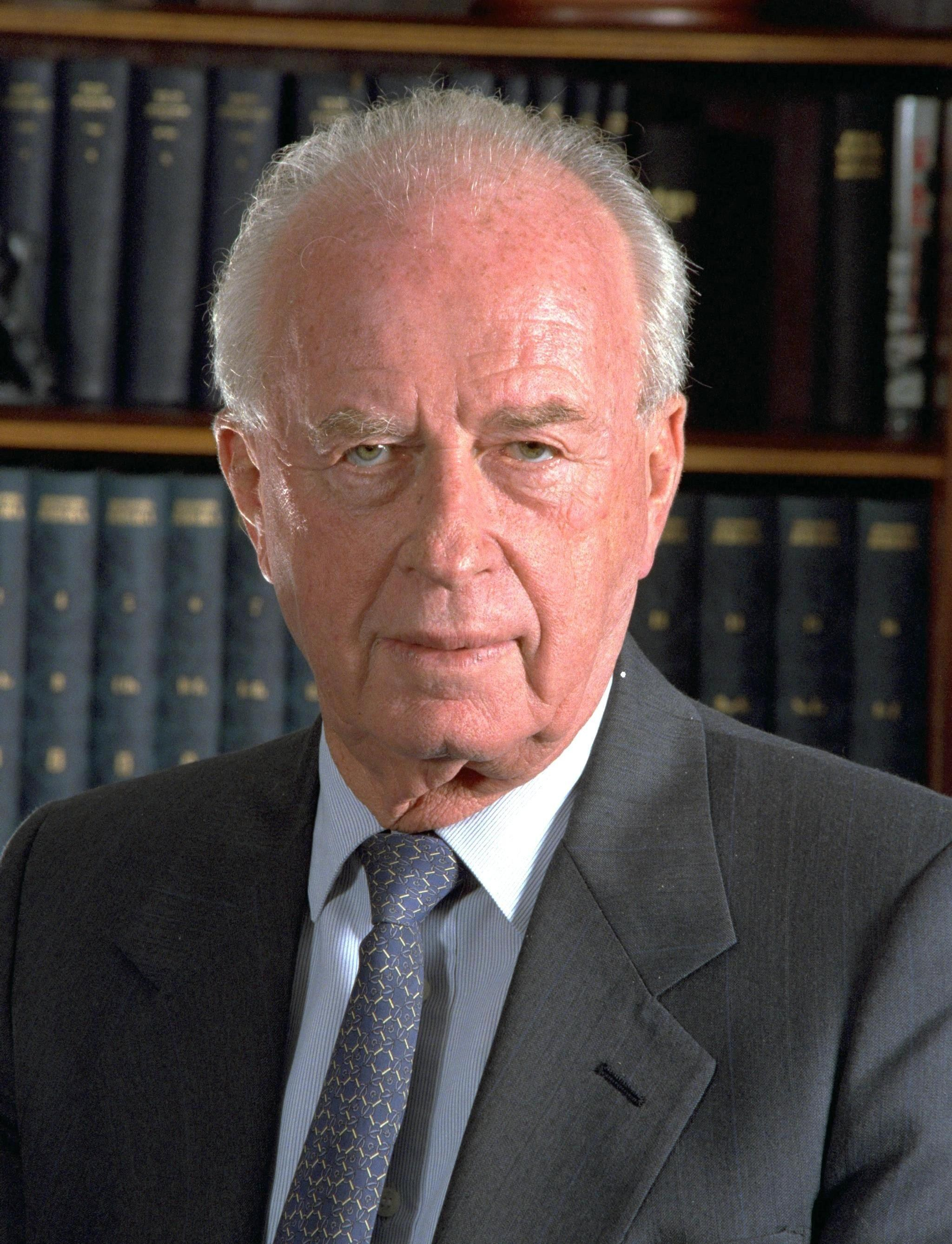
Yitzhak Rabin in 1994

The Dollar Account affair (Hebrew: פרשת חשבון הדולרים, Parashat Heshbon HaDolarim) was a political scandal in Israel in 1977, following the exposure of an illegal United States bank account held by Israeli Prime Minister Yitzhak Rabin and his wife Leah. It led to Rabin's de facto resignation from the government.

== Affair ==
In March 1977, while Yitzhak Rabin was meeting United States President Jimmy Carter, Leah Rabin was spotted making a withdrawal from a Washington, D.C. bank. She had been withdrawing money from a joint account in U.S. dollars in the names of Yitzhak and Leah Rabin. At the time, it was illegal for Israeli citizens to hold bank accounts overseas, barring exceptional circumstances; the account in question had been opened while Yitzhak Rabin was the Israeli ambassador to the United States (1968–73), and according to procedure, should have been closed once he left that post.

Dan Margalit, the Washington correspondent for the Israeli newspaper Haaretz was tipped off. He rushed to the bank in question, told the teller he owed the Rabins money, and asked to deposit a $50 check into the account. After confirming the existence of the account, the teller wrote down the account number on the back of Margalit's check prior to depositing it. Margalit memorized the digits and wrote them down. Haaretz broke the story on 15 March 1977, the day after Rabin returned to Israel.

Such minor offenses were usually resolved by an administrative fine, but Attorney-General Aharon Barak announced his intention to prosecute, coining the phrase "Buzaglo test", meaning that a leader must be held to the same judicial standards as an ordinary citizen.

Although Leah Rabin explained that she alone had operated the account, her husband publicly accepted joint moral and legal responsibility. He resigned following the revelation by Maariv journalist S. Isaac Mekel that the Rabins held two accounts in Washington, not one, containing $10,000, and that a Finance Ministry administrative penalty committee fined them IL150,000. Rabin thereupon announced (on 8 April) that he was withdrawing from the first place in the Alignment's Knesset list, and Defense Minister Shimon Peres was unanimously elected to succeed him. Since, according to Israeli law, resignation from a caretaker government was impossible, Rabin took a vacation from his duties as prime minister and Peres took his place.

== Aftermath ==
The affair followed a series of corruption scandals and is often seen as one of the reasons for the Alignment's loss in the upcoming election. Margalit's source later revealed himself to be the security officer of the Israeli Embassy in Washington. He said his motive for informing was moral rather than political, and that he himself had always been a Labor voter.

Criminal charges were brought against Leah Rabin for maintaining an illegal bank account. She pleaded guilty to the charges in the Tel Aviv District Court and was fined IL250,000 ($27,000) by judge Dov Levin. The Israeli Treasury imposed an administrative fine of IL15,000 on Yitzhak Rabin, ruling that his role in the currency violation had been passive.

In 2002, Maariv correspondent Ben Caspit reported that Dalia Rabin-Pelossof, Yitzhak and Leah's daughter, said she recently spoke with Professor Yaakov Ne'eman, a lawyer. She said he told her that many years ago he discovered a yellowing, forgotten internal regulation in the Finance Ministry's archives. This regulation stipulated that a member of the Foreign Ministry who completed his term abroad was permitted to hold a dollar account for three more years. Neeman said that following the discovery, he contacted Barak, who denied knowing about it. Formally, the regulation did not apply, as the account was discovered over three years after Rabin completed his term as ambassador in Washington. However, it might have dissuaded Barak from prosecuting, thus perhaps preventing Rabin's resignation. In an interview given to Haaretz in 2009, Barak said that had Yitzhak Rabin not resigned, he would have prosecuted him as well as his wife.

Rabin's resignation is sometimes seen as a display of public responsibility unmatched by later politicians.
