= Jordan B. Gorfinkel =

American cartoonist, writer (born 1967)

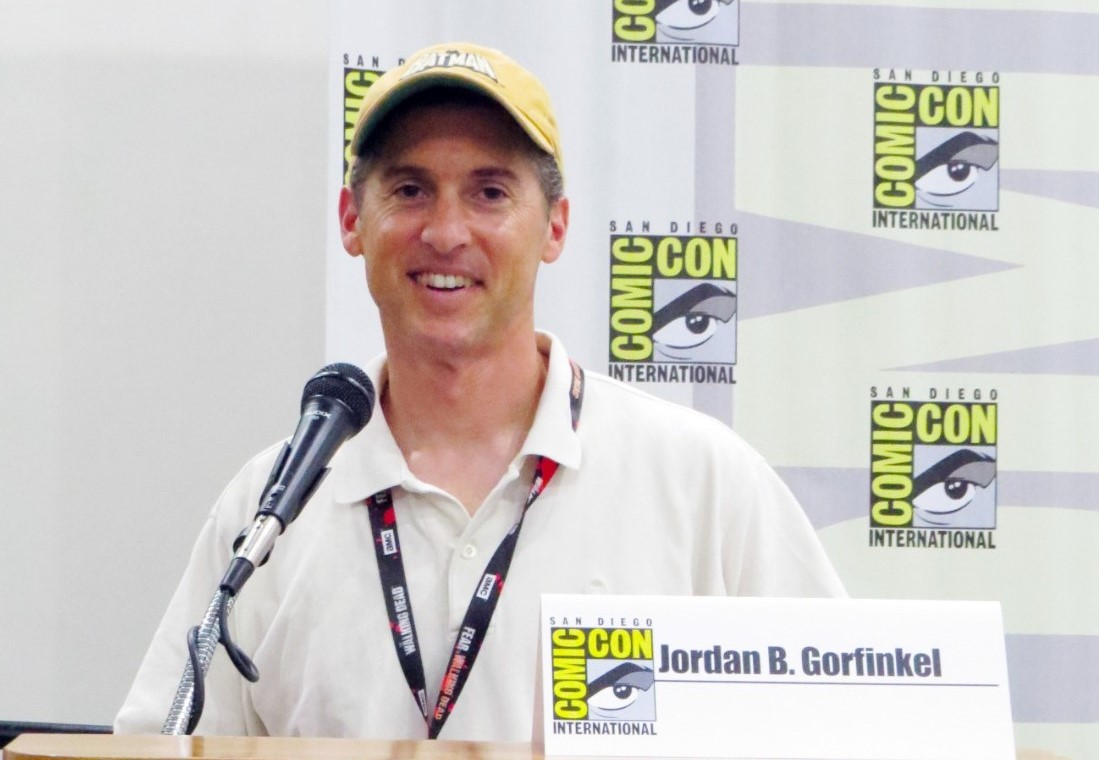
- Gorfinkel in 2016
- Born: Jordan B. Gorfinkel; July 7, 1967 (age 59)
- Areas: Editor, writer, producer, singer
- Pseudonym: Gorf
- Notable works: No Man's Land; Birds of Prey

Jordan B. Gorfinkel, also known as Gorf (born July 7, 1967), is an American comic book creator, newspaper cartoonist, and an animation and multi-media entertainment producer. He is also an a cappella singer, most notably with the groups Beat'achon and Kol Zimra, and produces music, videos, and live events.

Gorfinkel was an editor at DC Comics for nearly a decade where he managed the Batman franchise. His most notable additions to the Batman universe include Birds of Prey which was adapted into a 2002 network television series of the same name, and a 2020 film, and Batman: No Man's Land, which served as inspiration for The Dark Knight Rises, and Season 5 of the TV series Gotham.

== Comics ==
Gorfinkel is the creator/writer/artist of Everything's Relative, a newspaper comic-strip published weekly since 1996 in many major markets including New York, Minneapolis, Atlanta, Detroit and Baltimore. For most of the 1990s Gorfinkel guided the Batman comics franchise at DC Comics, coordinating publications, licensing and film and TV productions with the 60-year history of the DC Universe. In 1999 Gorfinkel conceived and directed the critically and commercially acclaimed series No Man's Land, serialized in several weekly chapters across most of the Batman line for the entire calendar year. "No Man's Land was the core inspiration for the highest regarded Batman media outside of the comic books... Batman Arkham City, Gotham, The New 52, and The Dark Knight Rises all borrow several plot elements and character setups from the introduction and rising action volumes of the comic series." He also conceived Birds of Prey, the most successful comic book series starring women since Wonder Woman.

In 2015, Gorfinkel released an original graphic novel published by Penguin Random House titled Michael Midas Champion. In January 2019, Gorfinkel released the Passover Haggadah Graphic Novel with Israeli illustrator Erez Zadok, published by Koren Publishers Jerusalem.

== Avalanche Comics Entertainment ==
In 2007, Gorfinkel founded Avalanche Comics Entertainment LLC (ACE), which uses illustrated storytelling to develop entertainment content and corporate branding. The company has been praised for its work in developing comics for Microsoft's "Heroes Happen Here". ACE clients also include Alibaba ("SuperAli" animation shorts series), Clorox ("SuperMoms"), Hasbro (Transformers franchise bible and film-adjacent comic book materials) and Toms shoes.

== Music ==
Gorfinkel has been a member of two Jewish musical groups, Beat'achon and Kol Zimra. He also organized the collection of American and Israeli musical talent featured in the 'Voices for Israel' project in 2004.

In June, 2011, Gorf released the song "MOT: Members of The Tribe" with Sean Altman as part of their "Simcha & Gorfinkel" music-comedy act. The song highlights the contrasts in different observance levels within Judaism. It promotes tolerance and respect.

== Munich Jewish Museum ==
The Munich Jewish Museum commissioned Gorfinkel to create a series of his Everything's Relative four-panel comic strip for its permanent exhibition. Museum director Bernard Purin wanted "visitors to learn about local Jewish life, history and religion. He thought comic art would be a good form to deal with contemporary issues and approached Gorfinkel in 2005." The ten cartoon storyline, displayed in German and English, "explores the idea of a Jew returning to Germany through the character Zayde, who visits Munich for the first time since his liberation from a concentration camp."
