= Buzaglo test =

The Buzaglo test is a phrase coined in Israeli law which subsequently developed into an idiom in Israel.

In 1976, the Attorney General of Israel at the time, Aharon Barak, decided to begin a criminal investigation against Asher Yadlin in relation to the Yadlin affair. Yadlin, an important figure in the dominant Mapai party who was under consideration for the position of governor of the Bank of Israel, was suspected of theft and receiving bribes. Yadlin asked to be questioned by the police in his office, but Barak refused on the grounds that the law should treat all equally, without regards to their social standing. Yadlin was questioned in a police facility, and was later convicted and sentenced to five years' imprisonment.

Barak's decision was significant at the time due to the prolonged dominance of the Mapai party in Israeli politics and society. Referring to the decision, Barak coined the phrase "the law for Yadlin is the same as the law for Buzaglo" (Din Yadlin – KeDin Buzaglo). The phrase was intended to mean that both the strong and the weak in society were subject to the law. Yadlin represented the predominantly Ashkenazi political elite of Israel, whereas Buzaglo, a common Moroccan Jewish surname, represented the Mizrahi population, which at the time were considerably poorer and weaker.

Although it was originally used in the context of the rule of law and specific corruption charges, the Buzaglo test has since become a litmus test for a range of inter-ethnic issues in Israel.
