= Dorit Beinisch =

Former President of the Supreme Court of Israel (born 1942)

- דורית ביניש
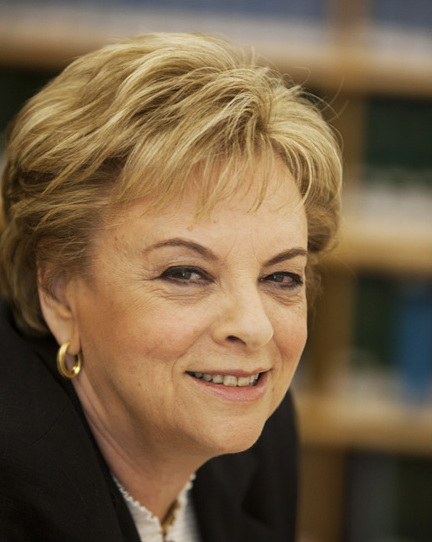

President of the Supreme Court of Israel
- In office 2006–2012
- Preceded by: Aharon Barak
- Succeeded by: Asher Grunis

Personal details
- Born: Dorit Werba; February 28, 1942 (age 84) Tel Aviv, British Mandate of Palestine
- Spouse: Yehezkel Beinisch
- Children: 2
- Education: Hebrew University of Jerusalem

Dorit Beinisch (Hebrew: דורית ביניש; born February 28, 1942) is a retired Israeli jurist. She was the 9th president of the Supreme Court of Israel. Appointed on September 14, 2006, after the retirement of Aharon Barak, she served in this position until February 28, 2012. She was the first woman to serve as president of the Israeli Supreme Court.

== Background ==
Dorit Werba was born in Tel Aviv, and attended Tichon Hadash high school in Tel Aviv. Her father, Aharon Werba, a civil servant, immigrated to Palestine from Poland in 1933. Her mother, Chava, was a kindergarten teacher in Tel Aviv. Beinisch served in the Israel Defense Forces, where she reached the rank of lieutenant. She studied law at the Hebrew University of Jerusalem, completing her Bachelor of Laws degree (LL.B.) in 1967. Two years later she completed her Master of Laws (LL.M.), summa cum laude, at the same university, while apprenticing in the Justice Ministry. In 1964, she married Yeheskell Beinisch, a Jerusalem lawyer. They have two daughters and five grandchildren.

Beinisch was awarded honorary Doctor of Philosophy degrees by the Hebrew University in Jerusalem in June 2010, and Ben-Gurion University in May 2012, as well as an Honorary Fellowship by The Interdisciplinary Center, Herzliya.

On November 12, 2012, she was awarded Doctor of Philosophy "honoris causa" degree from the Weizmann Institute of Science. Beinisch was awarded "Doctor of Humane Letters-Honoris Causa"by The "Hebrew Union College"Jerusalem, on November 14th,2012. Dorit Beinisch is a member as an Officer at The French "National Order of the Legion of Honour" since December 17, 2012. On December 30, 2012, Beinisch was awarded as a knight of The Movement for Quality Government in Israel.

On May 8, 2013, Beinisch was awarded "Honorary Citizen of Jerusalem". On June 13, she was awarded "Honorary Fellowship" by the Tel Aviv-Yafo Academic College. In May 2015 Beinisch received an honorary award from The Holon Technological Institute. Beinisch was nominated in May 2013 as the chancellor of the Open University of Israel and chairwoman of its council. In March 2023, Beinisch was named as “honorary citizen of Tel Aviv -Yaffo”.

From 2012 to 2014, she taught a seminar on national security judging at the Center on Law and Security (CLS) with Samuel Rascoff and Andrew Weissmann at NYU Law as a distinguished global fellow and a senior fellow.

Beinisch is a critic of the Israeli government’s judicial reform initiative, citing that it threatens the independence of the judiciary.

== Legal career ==
Beinisch joined the Ministry of Justice in 1967, doing her legal internship in the legislation department. She served in the Ministry of Justice for 28 years, holding senior positions to which women in Israel had never been appointed before.

=== State Attorney’s Office (1967–1995) ===
Between 1967 and 1969, Beinisch served as assistant in the Jerusalem District Attorney's Office until she completed her master's degree, moving up in 1970 to become senior assistant to the state attorney.

From 1976 to 1982, she served as the director of the Department of Constitutional and Administrative Law in the State Attorney's Office. She represented the state before the Supreme Court in constitutional and administrative cases.

From 1982 through 1988 she served as the deputy state attorney. She played an instrumental role in prosecuting some of the state's most difficult cases. She collected evidence for the Kahan commission which investigated the Sabra and Shatila massacre. During the prosecution of the Gush Emunim Underground she received threats to her life.

Beinisch served as the state attorney of Israel from 1989 to 1995, the first woman in Israel to hold this position. In this position, she directed all government litigation in all levels of courts, took part in forming the state's policy in criminal, constitutional and civil fields, and was responsible for all the professional aspects of legal representation of the state of Israel in the courts.

She supervised the lengthy investigation, trial and eventual conviction of then Shas Party chairman and former interior minister Aryeh Deri. She represented the state before the Supreme Court in significant constitutional, administrative and criminal law cases. For example, in the late 1980s, she headed the struggle in the Supreme Court that led to the banning of the far right-wing Kach party from the Knesset. She refused to represent Yitzhak Rabin's government in the High Court when a petition was filed against its decision to deport 415 Hamas members to Lebanon.

Beinisch fought for her professional and legal views on controversial issues, such as the Kav 300 affair in 1984. Appointed to handle the case by then attorney general Yitzhak Zamir, Beinisch, together with two other prosecutors, fought against the government and the Shin Bet to expose lies, resulting in rumors that she was having an affair with one of the Shin Bet agents and threats against her life.

=== Supreme Court Justice (1995–2005) ===
Beinisch was appointed as a Justice of Israel's Supreme Court in December 1995. She served as chair of the Central Elections Commission.

=== President of Supreme Court (2006–2012) ===
In September 2006 Beinisch was sworn in as President of the Supreme Court of Israel, after being voted in unanimously, becoming the first woman in Israel to hold this position. As President of the Supreme Court, she was the head of the Israeli judiciary and responsible for managing the court system. She believed that one of her primary tasks as President of the Supreme Court was to safeguard the independence of the Israeli court system and ensure its apolitical character.

In her rulings, Beinisch emphasized the same principles that she fought for during her public career, together with her belief regarding the role of the Supreme Court in a democratic society to protect human and civil rights, with special attention to the rights of women and children, socially vulnerable populations, and immigrant workers. Beinisch emphasized the importance of judicial review of the activities of the executive branch, including the military, as well as the importance of following the rule of law and the principle of non-discriminatory law enforcement, and preserving every person's right of access to court.

On January 27, 2010, Beinisch was injured when a 52-year-old man named Pinchas Cohen hurled his sneaker at her during a hearing on medical marijuana, hitting her between the eyes, breaking her glasses and knocking her off her chair. Cohen was disgruntled with the legal system over a family court decision four years earlier and has a violent history. He was arrested and later apologized for his act, and stated that he hoped she was well.

== Landmark rulings ==
Beinisch has focused on government corruption and to ensuring that government institutions adhere to the law, with a particular emphasis placed on the Defence Forces, the police and general security services.

In 2004 Beinisch criticized the use of expedited legislative mechanisms, often used by the Knesset to legislate various economic laws and reforms. She ruled that although judicial review of the legislative process in Israeli does not recognize a ground of lack of “legislative due process”, the Court would intervene if there is a defect in the legislative process that “goes to the heart of the process.” Such a defect is one that involves a severe and substantial violation of the basic principles of the legislative process in Israel's parliamentary and constitutional system.

In a 2006 case concerning a detainee's right to legal counsel, the Supreme Court acquitted a soldier convicted of using drugs on the basis of his own confession, because the military policeman who interrogated him did not inform him of his right to consult with an attorney.

In this decision, Beinisch ruled that in view of the normative change in the Israeli legal system introduced by the Basic Law: Human Dignity and Liberty, and in the absence of legislation on this issue, the time has come to adopt a case law doctrine of inadmissibility for illegally obtained evidence. She also held that the appropriate doctrine for the Israeli legal system to adopt is not an absolute one, but a relative doctrine which allows the court to exclude illegally obtained evidence at its discretion. In the specific case of the appellant, the failure to inform him of his right to consult a lawyer was intentional, and this was a significant factor in Beinisch's decision to exclude the confessions he made in the interrogation.

The same year, in one of her most famous and controversial rulings as a justice, she ruled that parents cannot use corporal punishment, writing that corporal punishment violates the child's right to dignity and bodily integrity.

Some of her most important rulings have dealt safeguarding human rights while addressing pressing security needs, primarily in cases concerning Israel's activities in the occupied Palestinian territories. In a 2005 ruling against the Israeli army's use of “human shields” she concurred with then-President Aharon Barak that the practice of sending in a local Palestinian ahead of Israeli troops during arrest raids endangered his life, violated his free will and his human dignity.

In a judgment rendered in September 2007 concerning the separation fence being built by Israel, Beinisch ruled that the military commander did not exercise his discretion in a proportionate manner and that he must alter the route of the fence in regards to a segment near the Palestinian village of Bil'in. In her judgment, Beinisch accepted the military commander's claim that the fence in Bil'in area was built for reasons of national security. Nevertheless, she held that the military commander had determined the route of the fence while taking into account the future construction plans for new Israeli neighborhoods near this area. These planned neighborhoods do not constitute a vital security need, and hence cannot be taken into account when determining the route of the fence. Thus, Beinisch concluded, the route of the fence in the Bil'in area did not meet the proportionality requirement.

In 2007, a petition was brought before the Supreme Court regarding the government's decision to protect the schools in Israeli cities from attacks by “Qassam” rockets fired from the Gaza Strip. In light of this decision, the authorities adopted a protection plan under which only some of the classrooms were protected. Beinisch ruled that the decision not to fully protect the main classrooms of children in grades 4-12 was extremely unreasonable. It was held that the court would intervene — albeit on rare occasions and with restraint — even in decisions concerning the professional discretion of the authority or the budgets allocated by it, if these decisions depart in an extreme manner from the margin of reasonableness given to the administrative authority.

In 2008, Beinisch ruled on interpretation of the Unlawful Combatants Law and the extent to which the law is consistent with international humanitarian law. In her leading judgment, she wrote that the administrative detention of an "unlawful combatant" significantly violates his right to personal liberty. This was consistent with the basic outlook that prevails in the Israeli legal system, according to which it is preferable to uphold a statute by interpretive means wherever possible, rather than to declare it void for constitutional reasons.

Several appeals were brought before the Supreme Court challenging specific internment orders that were made under the Unlawful Combatants Law. In her leading judgment, Beinisch wrote that there is no doubt that the administrative detention of an “unlawful combatant” significantly violates the right to personal liberty. While holding the law constitutional, she held that in view of the extent of the violation of personal liberty and of the extreme nature of the measure of detention provided in the law, an interpretive effort should be made in order to minimize, in so far as possible, the violation of the right to liberty so that it is commensurate with the need to achieve the security purpose, and not in excess thereof. Beinisch also held that the provisions of the statute should be interpreted, in so far as possible, in a manner consistent with the accepted norms of international law.

In 2009, Beinisch issued a precedent-setting ruling on the unconstitutional nature of the privatization of prisons. In this judgement, a panel of nine justices led by Beinisch struck down Amendment 28 to the Prison Ordinance, which calls for the creation of a prison in Israel to be managed and operated by a private corporation. She concluded that the Amendment violates the constitutional rights to personal freedom and human dignity. In her ruling, Beinisch stressed that although Amendment 28 was enacted out of a desire to improve the detention conditions of prisoners in Israel, the main purpose behind the Amendment was an economic one, reflecting a desire to save as much money as possible for the State. In this context, she stressed in her ruling that although the Supreme Court does not generally intervene in the government's and the Knesset's economic policies, when it comes to legislation affecting the most basic constitutional rights, the fact that an economic rationale may have motivated the legislation does not prevent the Court from passing judgment on the law.

In May 2012, the court ruled that employers who pay female employees a significantly lower salary than their male counterparts will bear the burden of proof in case they are accused of discrimination, thus strengthening women's workplace rights. In Beinisch's ruling, the High Court stated that a woman suing for discrimination will not have to prove she was deprived of pay because of her gender, but only show there is a significant difference in salaries. At this point, the burden of proof would lie with the employer who, in his part, will have to convince that there is a legitimate reason for the salary and that the employee was not discriminated. Moreover, the High Court recognized that at times, women have less leverage than men at negotiating pay; therefore, claims that a pay was negotiated freely before hiring the worker will not be enough to justify the extensive gaps.

Beinisch has also written some remarkable dissenting opinions. In a case dealing with former president of state, Moshe Katzav she held in a minority opinion that the plea-bargain agreement – formulated by the attorney general and the former president of Israel over sexual abuse charges – should be canceled because the details of that bargain contravened administrative principles and were against the public interest. In another case, Beinisch held, in a minority opinion, that the total ban on political advertisements in television and radio broadcasts is invalid because there is no explicit authorization in the primary legislation for such an excessive limitation on freedom of political expression.

== See also ==
- Israeli judicial system
