= Labor Courts of Israel =

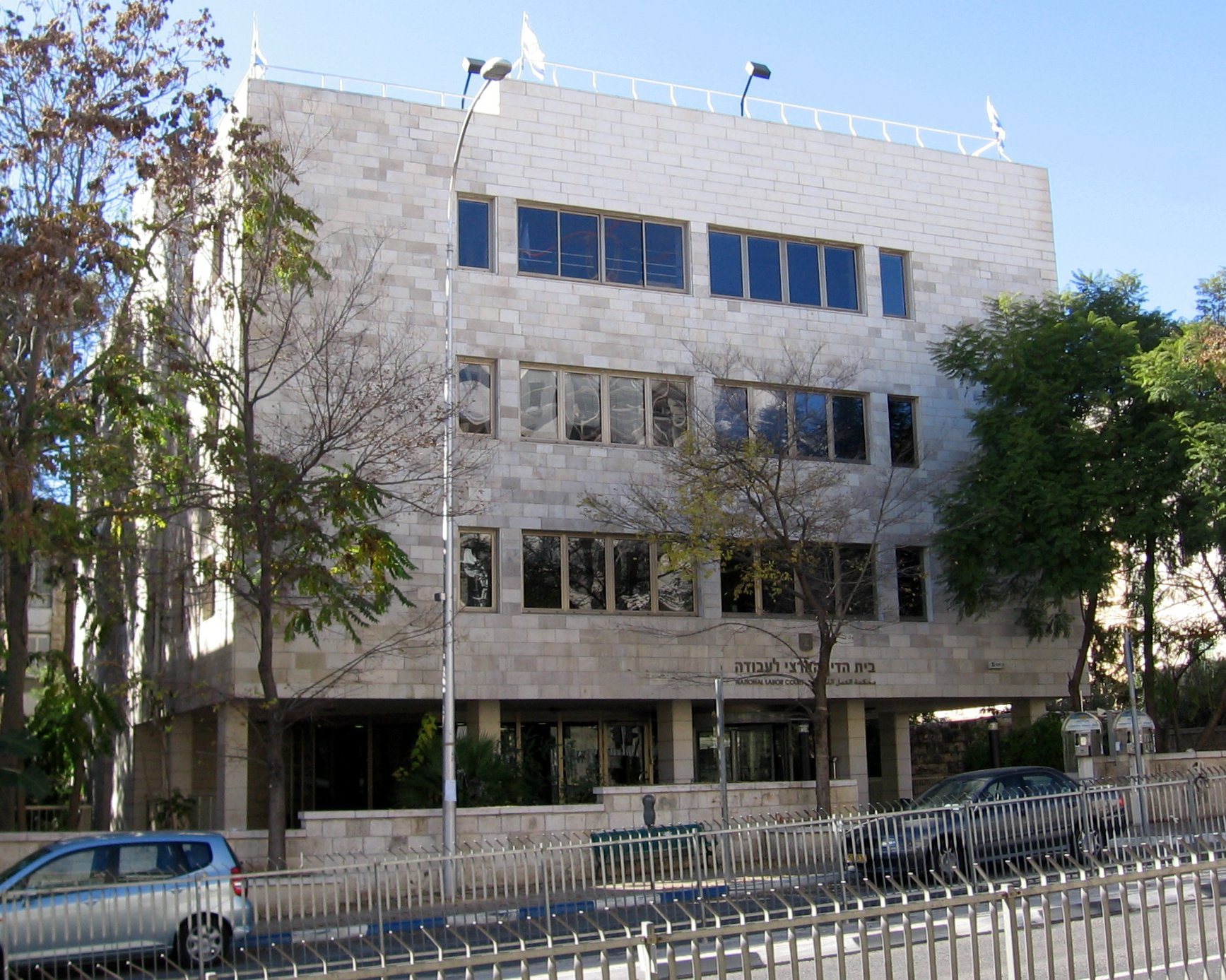
National Labor Court, Jerusalem

The Labor courts of Israel (Hebrew: בתי הדין לעבודה) are a network of Israeli courts established under the Law of the Labor Court, 1969. This court system is the appellate judiciary specializing in Israeli labor law and social security (National Insurance, Health Insurance etc.).

== Structure ==
Labor courts exist in two instances:

- Regional Labor Court: There are five regional courts, each situated in one of the following judicial districts: Tel Aviv, Jerusalem, Haifa, Beersheba, and Nazareth.
- National Labor Court: Situated in Jerusalem, this is an appellate court hearing appeals from judgments of regional courts. Certain issues, of particular importance (e.g. collective disagreements at national level), are heard in the national court as a first instance court.

The National Labor Court is considered the high authority in the field of labor law, and as such, is often excluded from the intervention of the Israeli Supreme Court. In some cases, however, the Israeli Supreme Court may agree to entertain an appeal. A legal dispute which existed between the then-President of the National Labor Court, Menahem Goldberg and the chief justice of the Supreme Court, Aharon Barak, the relations between the Labor Court to High Court. Goldberg and his predecessor Bar - Niv, ruled for the supremacy of the National Labor Court on the issues. Barak, however, allowed the petitions to the Supreme Court against a ruling by the National Labor Court.

Cases in the Regional Labor Courts are heard by one professional judge and two lay judges, one of whom has experience in the labor sector and another who has experience in management. Appeals to the National Labor Court are heard by three professional judges alongside two lay judges, who also are divided into one lay judge with experience in the labor sector and another in management. Lay judges in Israeli labor courts are appointed by the Minister of Justice and the Minister of Labor, and serve for a three-year period. They have equal voting power to the professional judges.

== National Labor Court Justices ==
- Zvi Bar-Niv – 1969–1986
- Menachem Goldberg – 1986–1997
- Steve Adler – 1997–2010
- Nili Arad – 2010–2013
- Yigal Plitman - 2013-2018
- Varda Wirth Livne - 2018-present

== See also ==
- Supreme Court of Israel
- Israeli military courts
- Military Court of Appeals (Israel)
