= Financial Advisor to the Chief of Staff =

The Financial Advisor to the Chief of Staff is a role assumed by the head of the Budgeting Directorate of Israel’s Ministry of Defense. The advisor is responsible for handling the budgeting for the Israel Defense Forces arms, the financial planning for the military, and coordinating these with Ministry of Finance. As of January 2026, the advisor is Brigadier-General Colonel (Tat-Aluf) Dr Nir Weingold.

== Financial Advisors ==
No.	Image	Name	Term	Notes	Ref.
1		Katriel Salmon			
2		Zvi Shariv			
3		Isser Penn			
4		Yehuda Aryeh Rosen			
5		Moshe Keshti			
6		Reuven Kari			
7		Yehuda Nitzan			
8		Yaakov Hefetz			
9		Nehemiah Cain			
10		Yitzhak Elron			
11		Yochanan Gur			
12		Zvi Shor			
13		Reuven Hershko			
14		Michael Navon			
15		Moti Besser			
16		Shmuel Ben Zvi			
17		Moshe Lippel			
18		Mehran Pruzenfar			
19		Reem Aminoach			
20		Sasson Haddad	? – 27 September 2017		
21		Ariella Lazarovich	28 September 2017 – 28 July 2021 (3 years and 10 months)	Lazarovich was the first woman to hold the office.	
22		Gil Pinchas	29 July 2021 – 14 January 2026 (4 years, 5 months, and 16 days)		
23		Nir Weingold	15 January 2026 – Incumbent (8 months and 22 days)		
