= Osnat Tzadok =

Israeli-born Canadian painter (born 1968)

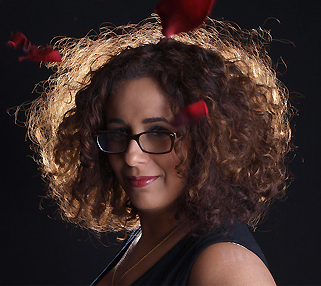
- Born: אסנת צדוק; 1968 (age 57–58); Israel
- Education: Self taught
- Known for: Abstract painter
- Patrons: 20th Century Fox Television, Thomas Nelson, Ramim Wines
- Website: osnatfineart.com

Osnat Tzadok (Hebrew: אסנת צדוק; born 1968) is an Israeli-born Canadian painter. She initially began selling her paintings over eBay; her work has also been featured on television and wine labels, and an educational textbook.

== Career ==
Tzadok was born and raised in Israel. As a stay-at-home mother to two children, she was gifted a book called "The Power of Your Subconscious Mind" which encouraged readers to pursue their dreams. This persuaded her to sell her art on eBay after selling a few works in the traditional market. After launching her works on eBay, she began selling approximately 80 paintings a month. In 2007, Tzadok was awarded third place in eBay's Canadian Entrepreneur of the Year Awards.

Tzadok's paintings have appeared on the set of the Fox Television series Prison Break. Tzadok herself was featured in a CBC News interview.

Tzadok's paintings have also been featured on the labels of wines bottled by Ramim, a boutique winery out of Israel, and on an educational textbook published by Thomas Nelson. In 2015, her abstract art was printed onto Häagen-Dazs ice cream packaging.
