= Tzadik =

Title in Judaism given to people considered righteous

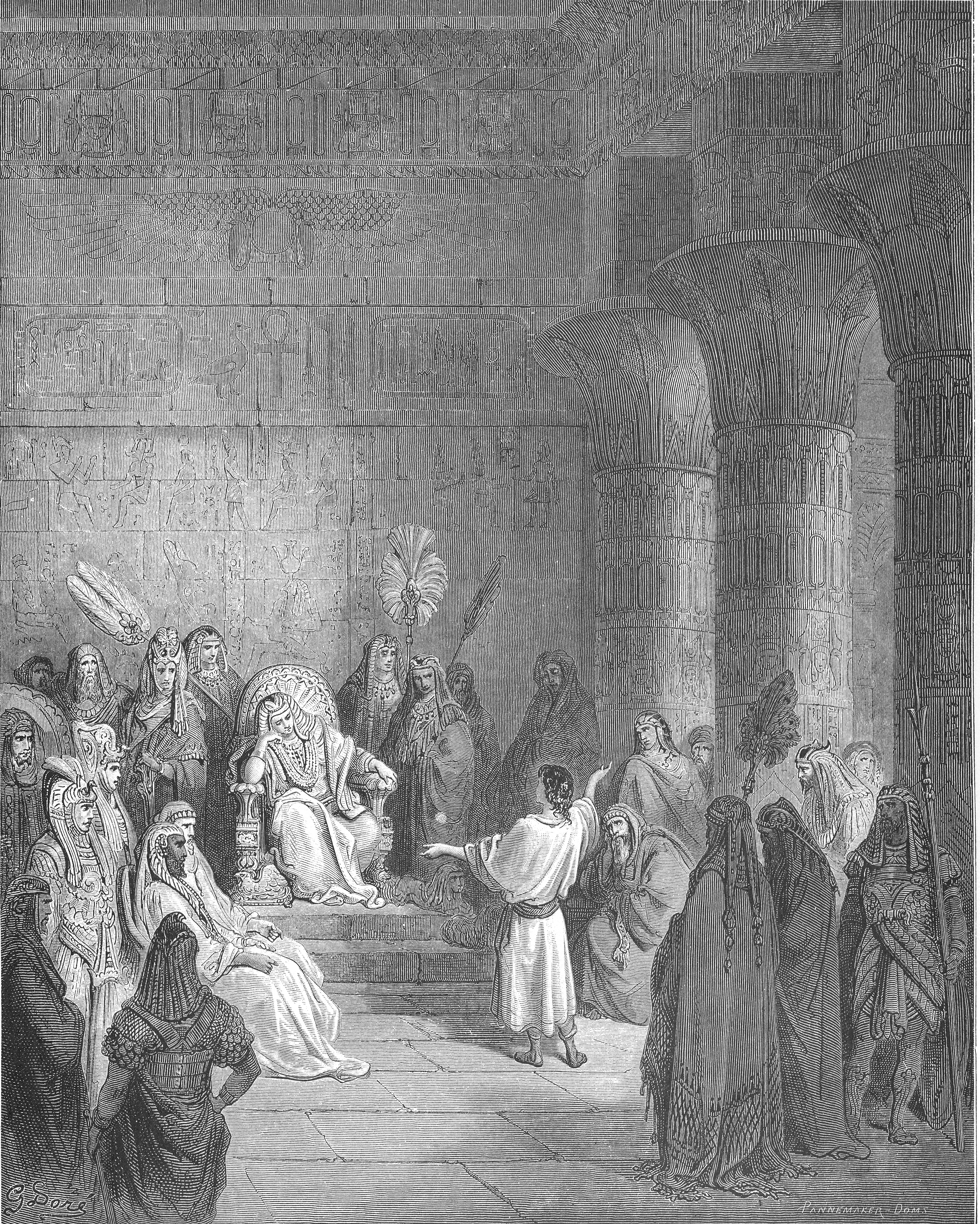
Joseph interprets Pharaoh's Dream (Genesis 41:15–41). Of the biblical figures in Judaism, Joseph is customarily called the Tzadik.

Tzadik (Hebrew: צַדִּיק ṣaddīq [tsaˈdik], "righteous [one]"; also zadik or sadiq; pl. tzadikim [tsadiˈkim] צדיקים ṣadīqīm) is a title in Judaism given to people considered righteous, such as biblical figures and later spiritual masters. The root of the word ṣadiq, is (צ־ד־ק ṣ-d-q), which relates to "justice" or "righteousness". When applied to a righteous woman, the term is inflected as tzadeket singularly or tzidkaniot in the plural.

Tzadik is also the root of the word tzedakah ('charity', literally 'righteousness'). The term tzadik "righteous", and its associated meanings, developed in rabbinic thought from its Talmudic contrast with hasid ("pious" honorific), to its exploration in ethical literature, and its esoteric spiritualisation in Kabbalah.

Since the late 17th century, in Hasidic Judaism, the institution of the mystical tzadik as a divine channel assumed central importance, combining popularization of (hands-on) Jewish mysticism with social movement for the first time. Adapting former Kabbalistic theosophical terminology, Hasidic philosophy internalised mystical experience, emphasising devekut attachment to its Rebbe leadership, who embody and channel the Divine flow of blessing to the world.

== Etymology ==
Ṣedeq in Canaanite religion may have been an epithet of a god of the Jebusites. The Hebrew word appears in the biblical names Melchizedek, Adonizedek, and Zadok, the high priest of king David.

== Nature of the Tzadik ==
=== Definitions ===
In classic Jewish thought, there are various definitions of a tzadik. According to Maimonides (based on Tractate Yevamot of the Babylonian Talmud 49b-50a): "One whose merit surpasses his iniquity is a tzadik".

According to Shneur Zalman of Liadi's Tanya, a work of Hasidic Judaism, the true title of tzadik denotes a spiritual description of the soul. Its true meaning can only be applied to one who has completely sublimated their natural "animal" or "vital" soul inclinations into holiness, so that they experience only love and awe of God, without material temptations. Hence, a tzadik serves as a vehicle (מרכבה merkavah) to God and has no ego or self-consciousness. Note that a person cannot attain such a level, rather it is granted from on High (or born with, etc.). This select level elevates the "Intermediate" person (beinoni) into one who never sins in thought, speech or action. Unlike the Tzadik, they only experience divine devekut (communion) during devoted moments of worship or study, while in mundane life they can be tempted by natural inclinations, but always choose to stay connected to holiness. In the Tanya the difference between the former Talmudic-Maimonidean and latter Kabbalistic-Hasidic conceptions is raised. Since the "Torah has 70 facets" of interpretation, perhaps both conceptions are metaphysically true:

As for what is written in the Zohar III, p.231: He whose sins are few is classed as a "righteous man who suffers", this is the query of Rav Hamnuna to Elijah. But according to Elijah's answer, ibid., the explanation of a "righteous man who suffers" is as stated in Raaya Mehemna on Mishpatim, which is given above. (Distinguishing 2 levels of Tzadik: The "righteous who prospers"-literally "good to him" is interpreted to mean that the natural soul in him has become "his own-transformed to good". The "righteous who suffers"-literally "bad to him" is interpreted to mean that his natural soul still exists in his unconscious, but is nullified to his Divine soul, "the bad-is under him") And the Torah has seventy facets. (So the reason for the question)

=== Tzadikim Nistarim ===
The Talmud says that at least 36 Tzadikim Nistarim (anonymous tzadikim) are living among us in all times.These people's existence ensures the continued existence of all the world. A parallel concept is found in Sufism, where 40 saints are said to rest on the heart of either Noah or Moses. These saints act as intercessors and ensure continued existence of the world. When one dies, another takes that one's place, so there are always 40.

=== Tzaddik of the generation ===
Hasidim adhere to the belief that there is a person born each generation with the potential to become Messiah, if the Jewish people warrant his coming. This candidate is known as the Tzadik Ha-Dor, meaning Tzaddik of the Generation.

=== Miracle workers ===
While tzadik status, according to its above definitions, is not necessarily related to the ability to perform or call upon miracles, the term tzadik is often used loosely by the Talmud to indicate those who have achieved especially outstanding piety and holiness. In this context, the tzadik's prayers are considered especially potent, as the Talmud states: "A tzadik decrees and the Holy One (blessed be He) fulfills." This is line with the Talmudic dictum: Rabban Gamliel the son of Rabbi Judah haNasi used to say: "Make His Will your own will, that He make your will as His Will."

== In Muslim countries and Israel ==
The veneration of tzadikim and the veneration of prophets and other figures from the Torah, Bible, and Quran overlapped significantly, as did the veneration of figures from one religion by other local religions. Certain theological concepts overlapped as well. In the Medieval Muslim worldview, places like Egypt, al-Shām (especially Syria), and Karbala were holy or blessed land, though not necessarily as much as Mecca, Medinah, and Jerusalem. Jews never regarded other cities as sacred as Jerusalem, but lands like Syria, Iraq, and Egypt were also seen holy. A more specific location often became holy when someone saw a prophet or saint in a vision and was told to build a shrine. The prophet or saint made the place holy, but their granting of holiness was limited. The holiness was perpetuated via ritual behaviors such as prayer, supplication, votive offerings, sprinkling perfume and water, laying on the shrines and tombs, living in them, circumambulation, touching, and taking soil and rocks away that were thought to heal through baraka. These actions marked the sites associated with saints and prophets as separate from their surroundings. Sites that were destroyed and never rebuilt were seen as having lost favor with God, the prophets, and the saints. Sites also became holy due to their place in scripture, eschatological tradition, legends, local performance of ritual, the import/export of sacred objects and substances, and the production and display of talismans. Saint and prophet shrines were more common in cities, but plenty have been recorded in rural areas.

Saints and prophets in the view of Medieval Jews and Muslims possessed baraka (which can be translated as "blessing"), an innate force which was also conferred into objects they'd used or places they'd been, both of which are very important to saint veneration. Jews also use the word qadosh ("holiness") in the same context. In both religions, God is the ultimate source of holiness, and holiness comes from being or having been in service of God. While some ideas, such as these, are shared, and saints were common in popular Jewish practice at various points in time, Judaism does not have a doctrine for sainthood in the way Islam does. This is despite the fact that saint veneration was common among Medieval Jewish communities in the region. One of the key traits throughout history, from the writing of 1 Kings to the Modern era, of a Jewish saint is their ability to produce rain.

Holy places, particularly the shrines and tombs associated with saints and prophets, were associated with supernatural sensory phenomena, particularly in the pre-modern era. This includes unnatural lights descending to holy sites or emanating from them, visions, unexplained pleasant smells, and clouds ascending from shrines or hovering over them. Both Jews and Muslims also said that a shrine of a prophet or saint would evoke a feeling of awe or holiness.

Hagiographic style literature, called ma'asiyyot (meaning tales, legends, or deeds), was published by Medieval Jews, such as A Book of Belief after Adversity, published in the 11th century by the Jewish sage Ibn Shahin.

Both votive and free will offerings were common at saint's shrines, and could be done for an individual's sake, or for the sake of an entire community.

Some Jewish literature places the tzadikim above the angels.

=== Egypt ===
In Egypt, Jewish saint veneration is not often a topic of research and is not prominently practiced today, though a number of Egyptian saints are said to be Jews who converted to Islam. There are three Jewish mausoleums in Egypt currently associated with the practice: Maimondes' tomb in Musky, Cairo; Sidi al-Amshati's tomb in El-Mahalla El-Kubra in Gharbia, which has not hosted any celebrations for some time; and Hatsera's mausoleum near Damanhur in Beheria. The Synagogue of Moses at Dammuh was also well regarded as a holy pilgrimage site, and in the Medieval era, other synagogues devoted to Moses and many shrines to Elijah existed. Such shrines commemorated the various places Elijah had taken refuge from King Ahab in.

Moses was venerated highly in part because of the Islamic admiration for him. The interfaith veneration of Moses made him a powerful tool for Jews in polemics against conversion to Islam, and part of why Moses is known as the highest prophet of Judaism today are these polemics, which sometimes borrowed Islamic epithets and titles typically used for Mohammed. The most famous of these were the defenses written by Moses Maimonides. This high regard meant that some Muslims also made pilgrimage to the Synagogue of Moses. The Synagogue of Moses was important to both Karaite and Rabbinic Jews, and was particularly important on Shavuot (which commemorates the giving of the Torah), and on the 7th of Adar (Moses's birth and death day). The 7th itself would be full of fasting and prayer, while the 8th was a more festive occasion. People would travel from all over Egypt to visit the Synagogue at these times. Pilgrims lit candles, burned incense, played music and games, and danced. Pilgrimage here was considered by some to be a substitute for pilgrimage to Jerusalem. Part of this was likely the Crusades. When it was too dangerous to travel to Jerusalem out of fear of Christian violence, the Synagogue may have seen an increase in visitors. Entire families regularly traveled together for pilgrimage to Dammuh. Certain behaviors were banned at points in the site's history, including: merry making, marionette shows, beer brewing, bringing in gentiles and apostates, unaccompanied women, men accompanied by boys (likely a reference to pederastic couples), desecration of Shabbat, chess, instrumental music, clapping, dancing, and men and women socializing. Of course, this list of prohibitions serves to tell us exactly what many Jews were doing during their pilgrimages to Dammuh. The letter declaring these prohibitions was published during the reign of al-Hakim, and may have been a pre-emptive attempt to avoid persecution (and therefore some of the restrictions may have been retracted once the more extreme decrees of the Caliph were rescinded).

The Synagogue was destroyed in 1498 on the orders of Qansuh al-Ghawri, but even after this it remained in the popular consciousness of Egyptian Jews. Even after its destruction, accounts of traveling to the site continue for another century. This may indicate it was only partially destroyed. By the 17th century, it was completely in ruins. Legends persisted after this point about the synagogue.

The site of the synagogue was believed to be where Moses stayed when he returned to Egypt under the command of God to free the Hebrews from slavery. It had a tree (sometimes identified as a sycamore) that was said to miraculously prevent itself from being cut down and wither when adultery was committed under it. It had faced periods of declines due to economic migration to different locales in Egypt long before its destruction, but Moses Maimonides and his son Abraham Maimonides personally helped revitalize the site. Abraham's pietist movement (which was heavily influenced by Sufism) also put the Synagogue in a place of great importance. It is not clear how exactly old the synagogue was, but it was extant already by 1099. Some of the traditions associated with it and the veneration of Moses may be pre-Islamic. It may date back to the Byzantine period, as Jews were known to have lived in Dammuh in large numbers at the time.

In Egypt, Israel, and Syria, some synagogues had a small room (a hevyah, "hidden enclosure") inside them that served as a shrine to Elijah, who was seen as somewhat equivalent to al Khadir. These were often in caves under the synagogue, and in Egypt and Palestine, occasionally were described as having chairs of Elijah and eternal lights inside them.

Hatsera was a Moroccan rabbi who died in Egypt while on pilgrimage, and was subsequently buried in Egypt. His tomb has been taken care of by Muslim Egyptians for many years, though it and it's pilgrimage has become a contentious legal and political issue. The tomb sits on a hill, and all hilltop tombs in Egypt are believed to protect surrounding villages from floods. Many locals mistakenly believe he was Muslim, or do not know what religion he was. A few even believe he was a Christian from the Pre-Islamic era. The local Muslim villagers often visit his tomb for healing, protection from the evil eye, or before Friday prayers. 89 other Jewish graves surround Hatsera's tomb.

In the anniversary of Hatsera's death, pilgrims come on a hillūla journey, mostly from Morocco and France. A market pops up, and pilgrims gather in the tomb to pray, ask for blessings, and place items on the grave in hopes they'll be blessed. After the prayers, a meal is held. A rabbi and one of Hatsera's descendants are typically in attendance.

Many Egyptians do not distinguish between saints of different religions, and simply rank them. First are the family of Mohammed, then the Companions, the martyrs, holy men, and lastly, local saints who are not well known outside their villages.

=== Iraq ===
In Iraq, Muslims and Jews served alongside each other as keeps of shrines associated with saints and prophets. Both Muslims and Jews visited the shrine of Ezra and Ezekiel. Ezekiel's pilgrimage often took place during Shavuot.

Among the tombs and shrines frequented by Jews in Iraq are the shrine of Ezekiel and the tomb of Ezra (in the 11th century said to be surrounded by the graves of seven tzadikim). Special songs were composed and sung during the pilgrimage to the former. Pilgrims often left valuable books there in hopes they would be blessed with sons, and vows of lamp oil for the eternal light were made. Pilgrims also left purses of money at Ezekiel's shrine for safekeeping until they returned from long travels. At one point there were also shrines for Daniel, Barukh ben Neriah, Rabbi Meir, and other Talmudic sages.

In Iraq (and among Iranian Jews, mainly those visiting Iraq on pilgrimage) Shia practices influenced Jewish ones. Both groups had pilgrimage processions, which took place at specific times of year, and prostrated at graves. These similarities and a yearly exposure to Shia practices led to Jews adopting some Shia customs. The yearly exposure was due to the fact that Shias stopped at the grave of Ezekiel during the Muharram procession.

The three areas of Shia influence were the procession to a holy place, the pilgrimage songs, and the carrying of flags/poles with a hand shaped item. The main Shia procession is the one during Muharram, commemorating the ambush and murder of Muhammad's grandson, Hussein. On the road to Karbala or in local processions, participants sing songs about the suffering of Hussein and his family, as well as the suffering of Shias. Some participants whip themselves, and the local processions among communities that can't travel to Karbala often include a small replica tomb that is carried during procession. Cloth banners are carried on stands with a metal hand (or other item) on top. These hands are called 'alam.

The songs during Jewish ceremonies around Ezekiel's tomb were based on these Shia songs from the procession. They were written in Judeo-Arabic and feature curses upon the enemy (one of the Shia influences). Jews also adopted local Muslim lyric styles for ceremonies at the shrines of other saints.

The 'alam represents the hand cut from Hussein's body during the ambush. For Shia Muslims the five fingers represent the 5 leaders of Islam: Muhammad, Ali, Fatima, Hassan, and Hussein. The similar Hand of Fatima used by Sunni Muslims represents the 5 pillars of faith; both are used as amulets. For Jews the metal hands patterned after the 'alam (sometimes called degel) is not a relic and not associated with war. They retained a protective function.

There were cloth flags draped on the coffin of Ezekiel, which were held during prayers and then placed back. During other gatherings at the tomb, flags dedicated to the prophets would be rented. People entered the tomb courtyard, sang, abd chanted praises. The rented flags were hung near the tomb and made of nice cloth. The metal hands were placed on top of the flagpole, though pomegranates were sometimes used instead. The money from this rental was used to upkeep the tomb and help the community. The cloth flags were replaced yearly. The metal hands (as well as other silver and gold items, clothes, and bracelets) were donated as votives for healing, success, love, and so on. Specific illness also had votives representing an afflicted body part (a person healed from vision issues may donate a golden eye shaped token, for example).

The metal hands were also used at other shrines, and were often engraved with an inscription to a prophet or saint (Elijah, Rabbi Meir, etc) with their name, a request, and an acronym meaning "and may his might protect us". It was transmitted as a tradition by traveling Iraqi Jews, such as to India. The hands were also given to synagogues if travel to a tomb was inaccessible.

Iranian and Afghan Jews also used metal hands as Torah finials (rimonim), which were derived from this custom. These were made in pairs, consecrated, and used in synagogues. Inscriptions were more varied, though same had the same type of inscription as the Iraqi hands. The other inscriptions included Biblical verses, names of God that were repeated, psalms written in the shape of menorahs, declarations of faith, and so on. However within Iran and Afghanistan, these hands were not used during saint veneration at tombs (though they participated in their use when visiting other communities who did use them for saint and prophet veneration at a shrine or tomb). Similar finials were also used in India, though it is not clear whether this was influenced by interaction with Shia Indians or if it was influenced by the practices brought to India by Iraqi Jews.

=== Lebanon ===
In Lebanon, Karak Nuh hosts a tomb thought to be that of Noah, an identification dating back to the Medieval era.

=== Morocco ===
In Morocco, emphasis has been put on saint veneration's similarities between Jewish and Muslim communities to different political ends. While these practices are indeed similar, and saints may be shared between communities, certain elements are uniquely Jewish. Saints and their icons are often likened to Torah scrolls and are physically treated in similar ways- the tomb of a saint is like a Torah's ark, and the frames of icons are made with similar materials to Torah mantles. Pilgrimages also borrow elements from Torah services. Annual Jewish pilgrimages to tzadik's tombs were called hillūla, meaning celebration.

Both Jews and Muslims held communal meals in the tomb sanctuary. Both attributed saints with the power to heal, do miracles, control nature, perform spiritual and ritual healing via trance, and control jinn. Tzadikim were also attributed to send messages in dreams, spirit forms, and while transformed into animals. Some of these traits are also similar to Christian saints, which likely influenced Iberian Judaism and was brought to Morocco by the expulsion of Jews from Spain.

The differences between the traditions include the fact that Muslim marabouts were recognized while alive, and were commonly related to, or were students or followers of, other holy figures. Tzadikim typically did not come from such holy lineages and were recognized after their deaths. Marabouts also often joined or were said to join anti-colonial resistance groups, while tzadikim did not.

Tzadikim in Morocco are typically Torah scholars, miracle workers, and divine mediators. Stories and poems written about them are done in the same style and tradition as other Rabbinic literature. They were usually Rabbis, which is not uncommon in the Jewish tzadik tradition. Many saints in both Judaism and Islam were localized and only worshipped in specific areas. Others gained widespread recognition. Jews believed their saints to be superior to Muslim saints, and sometimes viewed the Muslim worship and serving of the tzadikim as evidence of this. Other saints include pious and noble individuals in general, and even sometimes personified natural features (like trees).

Animal sacrifice is a prominent part of saint veneration for Moroccan Jews, as part of Maghrebi views on obligation between humans and the supernatural. Some families also had specific saints that were their patrons, and would dedicate a small part of their home to lighting candles in their honor.

The similarities of Moroccan Jewish and Muslim practices, including saint veneration, were used by colonial European powers to claim Morocco was unified and consisted of a distinct nation, but that Moroccans were not sufficiently united to resist imperialism. Today, these similarities are used to emphasize and display tolerance of religious minorities. In the colonial era, these overlaps and similarities led to positive economic relations in regard to saint veneration. The infrastructure introduced during colonialism increased the number of pilgrims for everyone, which increased their economies and the logistics for organizing them. The festive nature of Jewish pilgrimages in Morocco also increased during this time. Muslims often did the upkeep and protection of tombs, as the sultan would appoint them to protect the cemeteries of dhimmis. Today the government of Morocco continues to upkeep tombs and help organize and facilitate pilgrimages.

Moroccans continue their saint veneration in other countries, including Israel. They believe in some cases that their saints have immigrated along with them and taken residence in new graves via miracle. However, others also continue to go on pilgrimages to Morocco. Instead of tomb complexes (which began to be built around the 1940s) rituals for saint veneration in other countries take place in synagogues dedicated to that saint.

Like Iraqi Jews, many Moroccan Jews auction off certain items to help with tomb upkeep and community expenses. For Moroccans these were typically glasses or candles.

=== Israel ===
In Israel, the sites associated with tzadikim and other holy figures have become politically contentious. These sites were once frequented by all religions in the area, with varying personal beliefs about who was buried there, but following the creation of the State of Israel, Arabs, whether they are Muslim or otherwise, have often been banned from these sites. As such these sites are often at the center of violence.

=== Syria ===
Like in Morocco, Syrian Jews historically did not recognize living saints, while their Muslim neighbors did.

In Damascus, Muslims, Jews, Christians, and Zoroastrians would all visit the same tomb of a medieval Muslim saint (Shaykh Arslan), a sharing of holiness that was once common throughout Muslim majority countries.

Both the Medieval Jews and Muslims of Damascus believed the city would be the site of the coming of the Messiah at the end of time. Many sites in the city were given specific future roles in this, as well as being associated with various holy figures such as Abraham and Noah.

Some of the holy sites frequented by Jews in Syria throughout history include the Synagogue of Elijah in Damascus (which contained a shrine dedicated to Elijah as well), another shrine dedicated to Elijah in Jawbar, east of Damascus, the propurted Tomb of Ezra in Taduf near Aleppo, the shrine of Abraham in Kefar Avaraham (aka Barza) near Damascus, and several other shrines dedicated to Elijah throughout Syria. Abraham has been associated with Damascus as far back as Josephus's writings, who recorded the belief that he had ruled Damascus as a king during some of his life.

== Terminology in Kabbalah ==
=== Identification with Yesod ===
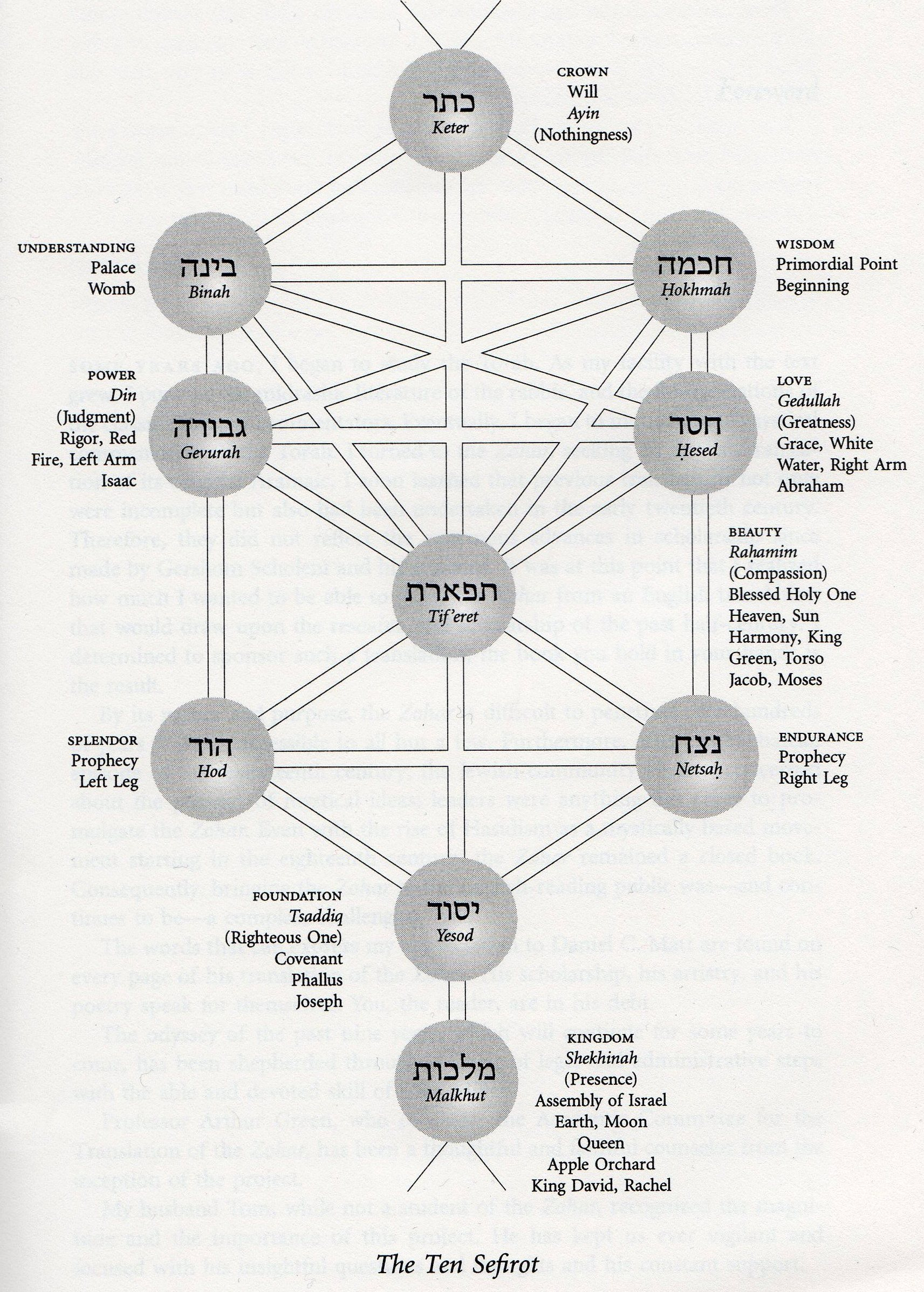
Correspondences; Yesod-Foundation: 9th sefirah, Tzadik, Covenant, channels Heaven to 10th sefirah: Kingship, Earth, Shekhinah, Israelites.

"..For all that is in Heaven and on Earth.."
"-For all כל (Yesod) joins the Heaven and the Earth"
"The Tzadik is the foundation (Yesod) of the World"

In the system of 10 Sephirot Divine emanations in Kabbalah, each of the 7 emotional expressions is related to an archetypal figure in the Hebrew Bible. The first emanated realm to emerge from God's potential Will in Creation is Atziluth, the World of "Emanation". As it is still nullified to Divinity, so not yet considered a self-aware existence, it is the realm where the 10 Sephirot attributes of God are revealed in their essence. In lower spiritual worlds the sephirot also shine, but only in successively lower degrees, concealed through successive contractions and veilings of the Divine vitality. Seven biblical tzadikim, righteous figures are considered as embodiments of the emotional sephirot of Atzilut: Abraham-Kindness, Isaac-Restraint, Jacob-Mercy, Moses-Endurance, Aaron-Glory, Joseph-Foundation, David-Kingship. While all seven figures are considered supreme Tzadikim, in particular contexts, either Joseph as Yesod, and Moses as inclusive soul of the community, are identified especially as archetypes for the Tzadik in general.

In the sephirot, Chesed-Abraham, Gevurah-Isaac and Tiferet-Jacob are higher spiritual powers than Yesod-Joseph, which channels the higher powers to their fulfilment in Malchut action. However, traditionally in Judaism, Joseph is referred to with the quality of "Tzadik-Righteous". While the Patriarchs lived righteously as shepherds, Joseph remained holy in Egypt, surrounded by impurity, tested by Potiphar's wife, captive in prison, and then active as viceroy to Pharaoh. As the Heavenly sephirah of Yesod-"Foundation" channels spirituality to our physical realm, so in Kabbalah and the further development in Hasidic thought, its function also parallels the human role of the Tzadik in this world:

- In the Divine, Yesod is the 9th Sefirah, in the middle balanced column, connecting all the higher sefirot, centred on Tiferet-"Beautiful" emotional harmony, to the last sefirah Malchut- realisation in "Kingship". In the flow of Divine Creative lifeforce, this represents the connecting channel between Heaven and Earth, between the "Holy One Blessed Be He" (Tiferet Divine transcendent male manifestation of God), and the "Shekhinah" (Malkuth indwelling Divine immanent female presence of God). The 16th century Safed Kabbalists introduced the prayer "For the sake of the union" of these principles before Jewish observances.
- In the soul, Yesod is contact, connection and communication with outer reality of malchut, similar to the way the foundation of a building connects it with the earth.
- In the bodily form of man and woman, Yesod corresponds to the organ of procreation, analogously where the Tiferet body descends towards action, expressed in the procreative power to create life. This relates to the Circumcision "Covenant of Abraham", the Jewish "Sign of the Covenant" with God. As the Torah describes two levels of Jewish covenant, physical "covenant of circumcision" and spiritual "circumcision of the heart", so women are considered born already physically circumcised. Joseph's resistance to Potiphar's wife represents his perfection of the "Sign of the Covenant". Yesod is the foundation of a person's future generations, the power of generating infinity in the finite.
- Yesod is identified with the righteous tzadik, "the tzadik is the foundation of the world". As Jewish mysticism describes different levels of Tzadik, Kabbalah sees this verse as particularly referring to the one perfect tzadik of the generation. In the tzadik, God's infinite-transcendent light becomes manifest in this finite-immanent world. The tzadik procreates spiritually through revealing Divinity in new Torah interpretations, and through awakening return to God in his generation.
- Yesod connects beginning to end in God who encompasses all. In the Bible, Abraham began the Yesod covenant of circumcision, though his sefirah is Chesed love-kindness, the first emotional expression. Love creates the unity of spiritual covenant. For Abraham this descended into action, to become expressed in the physical covenant of circumcision. Yesod expresses this descent, uniting spiritual and physical. "Foundation" is the beginning of a building and the conclusion of planning. Yesod is the power to bring action to conclusion, to reveal that the beginning and end are united in God, "the end is wedged in the beginning, and the beginning in the end".
- Each Sefirah contains an inner dimension, as a soul motivating its outer Kabbalistic emanation function. Hasidic thought explores the Divine motivation within, by psychologising Kabbalah through man's experience. The inner motivation of Yesod is Emet-truth, each person's desire for their actions to reflect their true soul intention, fulfilling in action God's essential intention for Creation. The Tzadik experiences the wish for Divine purpose consummately.

=== Intellect in the supernal soul of the community ===
"..To love the Lord your God, to listen to His voice, and to cleave to Him.."
"Cleaving to a Torah scholar is as cleaving to the Divine Shechinah"

The leaders of Israel over the masses stem from the intellect of Adam's soul
"In every generation there is a leader like Moses"

- The soul of the Tzadik is an inclusive, general soul of the community. In Kabbalah, gematria (numerical value) has significance, because Creation is formed through Divine "speech" as in Genesis 1. The gematria of Yesod (יסוד) is 80, 8 times 10, forming reduced value of 18 (חי Life), as a tzadik is called truly alive spiritually. 80 is the value of Klal (כלל), the "community", the extension of Kol (כל), the term in Kabbalah for the sephirah of Yesod. The "Tzadik of the generation" is a "general soul" (neshama klalit) of the generation, in which each individual soul is included. Hasidic thought focuses on this parallel, and its application for each person. Through the personal connection of each soul to the tzadik, their Yechidah soul-essence becomes revealed, through the revelation of the Yechidah of the Tzadik.

==== Breslov Hasidut ====
...the Rebbe (Nachman of Breslov) must have intended that we go there for Rosh HaShanah, continually, until the arrival of the Mashiach. The Rebbe himself said that the Evil had glorified many false leaders, making it extremely difficult to find where Moses is - the true Tzaddik. You should know, my friend, that this is the reason we have come here: to join our precious heritage with a bond that will last every day of our lives

— Nathan of Breslov

Rebbe Nachman of Breslov explained how only a true leader can awaken the most genuine Jewish faith: this leader is the Tzadik.

== Variants as first names ==
- Hebrew: Tzadik, Zadik, or Tzadok
- Amharic, Tigrinya: Tsadik (ጻድቅ) or Tsadkan (ጻድቃን)
- Arabic: Sadiq, Sadeq (صَادِق)
- Persian: Sadegh or Sadeq

== See also ==
- Gadol
- Gaon
- Sydyk
- Saint
- Wali

== Sources ==
- Frumer, Assaf. Kol Hanikra Bishmi (Hebrew)
- Lessons In Tanya
- Pevzner, Avraham. Al HaTzadikim (Hebrew). Kfar Chabad. 1991
