= Haim Zadok & Co. =

Israeli law firm

- Headquarters: Tel Aviv, Israel
- No. of offices: 1
- No. of attorneys: 26
- Major practice areas: Commercial law
- Key people: Ilan Shavit-Stricks, senior & managing partner
- Date founded: 1958
- Founder: Haim Yosef Zadok
- Website: www.zadok-law.com

Haim Zadok & Co. is a law firm in Tel Aviv, Israel, established by Haim Yosef Zadok. The firm specializes in corporate and commercial law; insolvency, recovery and corporate reorganization; banking; high-tech and venture capital; litigation; constitutional and regulatory law; and public and administrative law. Its expertise lies in complex corporate rehabilitations, receiverships, liquidations, and managing companies in difficulties.

The firm's 26 lawyers, trained in Israel and abroad, do public and pro-bono work, including representing UNICEF in Israel and supporting the University of Tel Aviv's law school scholarship fund.

== History ==
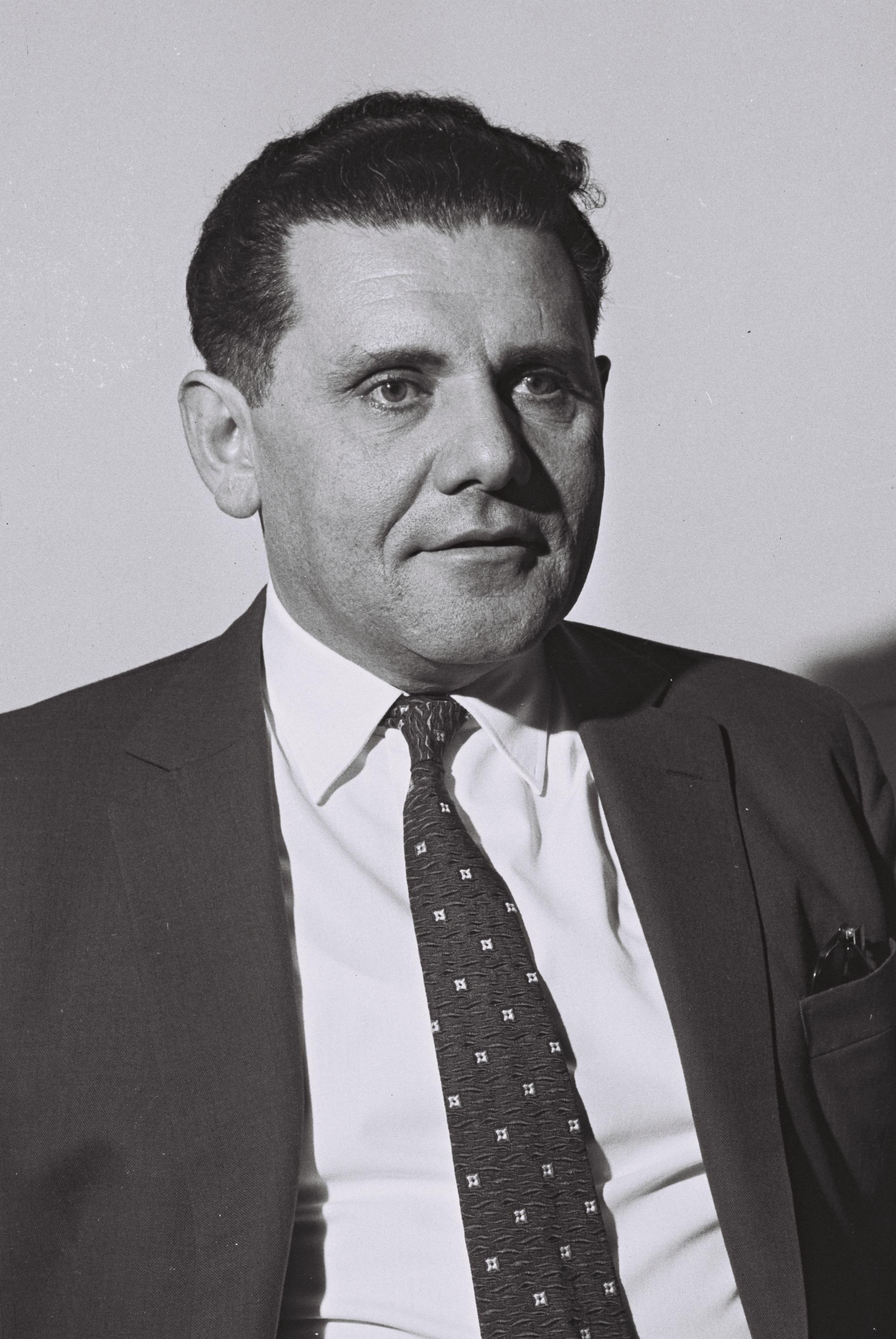
Haim Yosef Zadok, 1951

Haim Zadok & Co. was founded in 1958 by Haim Yosef Zadok, a prominent lawyer and former Labor minister. Zadok served as Israel's Minister of Justice, Minister of Industry and Trade, and Minister of Religion. In 1993, he was elected president of the Israel Press Council.

In 1989, the firm, with its founder representing it, argued to the Knesset Economic Committee that cigarette advertising does not encourage young people to start smoking.

In 1990, the firm represented Bank Leumi in a dispute with its former chairman and CEO, Ernest Japhet. The bank sought NIS 15 million in compensation for unusually lucrative personal contracts that Japhet had signed with senior executives. In 2000 the firm was appointed by the courts to act as trustee for the sale of United Steel Mills.

In 2001 the firm represented Time, Inc. in the case of Sharon vs. Time Inc., in which Sharon contended that Time magazine libeled him in its 1983 cover story about the 1982 Sabra and Shatila massacre. In 2007 the firm represented Bank Hapoalim in litigation against Heftsiba, a bankrupt property developer.

Ilan Shavit-Stricks is Haim Zadok & Co.'s senior and managing partner. The firm's of counsel was Advocate Dan Meridor, a former Minister of Justice and Minister of Intelligence and Atomic Energy. It was announced in November 2009 that he and Shavit would face a disciplinary proceeding of the Israel Bar Association for writing an illegal fee contract with Arcadi Gaydamak.

== Published works ==
- At the Law's Cradle, Haim Zadok, Israel Democracy Institute
- The Relative Advantages of Banks in Israeli Legislation, Ilan Shavit-Stricks and Nitza Posner, Global Banking, 2004. An updated version of this article is available on-line.
