= Erez Zadok =

Israeli comic book writer

- Native name: ארז צדוק
- Born: 1980 (age 45–46) Natanya
- Language: Hebrew (עברית)
- Genre: comics
- Partner: Liat Rotner

Erez Zadok (Hebrew: ארז צדוק) is an Israeli comic book writer. He is known especially for his graphic novel Tranquilo (טרנקילו).

== Early life ==
In 1998 Zadok finished high-school, and published short comic book stories. His most famous stories from those years were Max (מקס) and Zoo-La (Zoo-לה). They were successful and were published in various youth magazines.

He studied visual arts at Bezalel Academy of Arts and Design. He finished his studies there in 2014, and as his final project he published the book Tranquilo. The book tells about his trip in South America after serving in the army, and was also a success. Nissim Hezekiah pointed at the book as one of the five best Israeli comics. Apart from the paper, Zadok published his comic stories on Instagram and as of 2020 his Instagram page had almost 10,000 followers.

In 2015 he collaborated with Liat Rotner and together the two created the successful comic book for teenagers Miko Bell: The Potions Boy.

In 2019 Zadok published an illustrated Passover haggadah written by Jordan B. Gorfinkel.

He is married to Lina, and they have a daughter, Mai.
