= Avraham Ofer =

Israeli politician (1922–1977)

- אברהם עופר
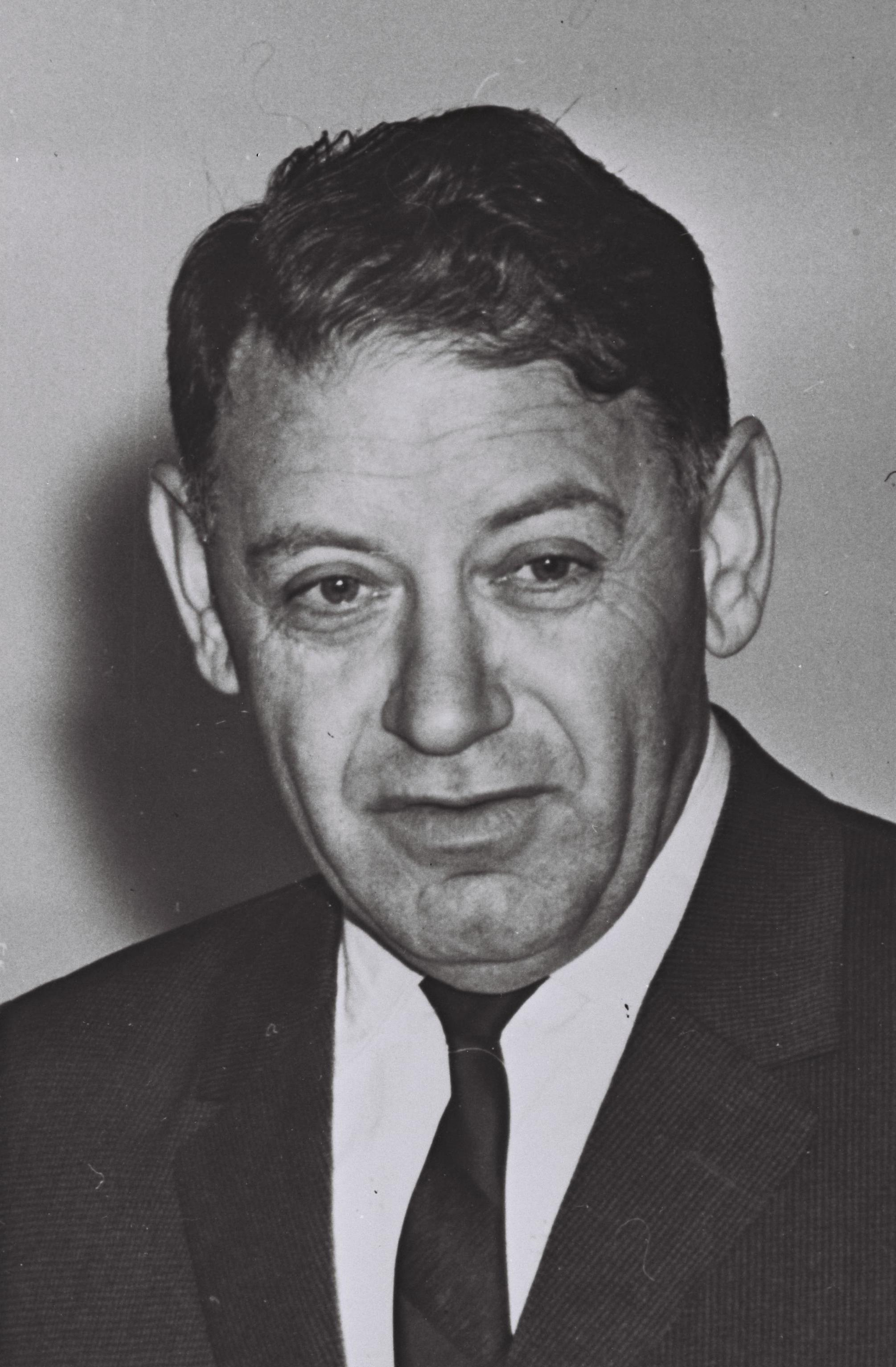

Ministerial roles
- 1974–1977: Minister of Housing

Faction represented in the Knesset
- 1969–1977: Alignment

Personal details
- Born: 1922 Chorostków, Poland
- Died: 3 January 1977 (aged 54–55) Tel Aviv, Israel

Avraham Ofer (Hebrew: אברהם עופר; 1922 as Avraham Hirsch – 3 January 1977) was an Israeli politician, famous for committing suicide following the eruption of a corruption scandal.

== Biography ==
Ofer was born in the Chorostków shtetl in Poland (today in Ukraine) in 1922, and immigrated to Mandatory Palestine in 1933. He went to High School in Jerusalem and studied in the Hebrew University of Jerusalem. In 1937 he joined the Haganah and in 1942 he was among the founders of Kibbutz Hamadia. In 1944 he was one of the founders of the Young Leadership in Mapai and among of founders and first Director of HaKfar HaYarok.

In the 1948 Arab-Israeli War, he was one of the 3 men who were charged with building the Israeli Navy and served in it as a lieutenant colonel, and was later the first commander of the Eilat Naval Base.

In 1952, he was elected Secretary of Mapai in Tel Aviv District. In 1958, he joined the Agriculture Ministry, established the Poultry Council and became Deputy Director General for Economic Affairs. In 1964, he was a member of the delegation that conducted negotiations with the European Community and at the end of that year he was appointed General Manager of "Ashdod Company". In 1965, he was elected to the Tel Aviv City Council and was Deputy Mayor of Tel Aviv until 1967, when he was appointed Managing Director of "Shikun Ovdim". In 1969, he was elected to the 7th Knesset for the Alignment. He is known for his amendment to the election law, initiated along with Gahal's Yohanan Bader, which adapted the D'Hondt method, effective since the 8th Knesset. In 1973, he was appointed Minister of Housing by Yitzhak Rabin.

=== The scandal ===
In November 1976, Yigal Laviv, a correspondent of the weekly Haolam Hazeh, gave the police information on 30 different matters raising suspicions of offenses committed by Ofer, including allegations of embezzlement in Shikun Ovdim funds in favor of the party. The police examined Laviv's charges, but came to the conclusion toward the end of the year that they were not substantiated, leading Ofer to expect that an official statement clearing him would soon be made.

However, Attorney General Aharon Barak decided to continue with the investigation based on new testimony. On 31 December a witness in the Yadlin affair sent the police a statement which raised more questions for investigation, and various rumors were published about possible charges. On 2 January, Prime Minister Rabin and Justice Minister Zadok assured Ofer that everything possible would be done to expedite the inquiry.

On January 3, his body was found in his car on a Tel Aviv beach. In a suicide note, Ofer said he was innocent, but did not have the strength "to bear any more." He was reported to have been particularly depressed by the lack of support from his political associates.

Rabin delivered the eulogy at Ofer's funeral. Speaking to the country's political elite at a crowded service in Tel Aviv, Rabin recalled how Ofer had come to him to discuss the accusations in what turned out to be their final meeting. "Your words still ring in my ears," the Premier said. ' 'Yitzhak,' you told me, 'believe me, I am not guilty of any transgressions.' I replied to you, Avraham, that I, Yitzhak Rabin, wholly trust in your innocence."

The succession of scandals led Rabin's opponents to charge that he lacked the ability to lead, and in the 1977 elections the Alignment indeed lost. After his death, the charges were dropped and Ofer's guilt was never proven. Today, his suicide is often seen as a display of shame among civil servants that is perceived to be missing in contemporary Israeli politicians.
