= Zadok Amani =

12th-century Jewish liturgical poet

Zadok Amani (Hebrew: צדוק עמאני) or Alamani (אלעמאני) was a 12th-century Jewish liturgical poet.

He wrote the following eight poems that are found in the Tripolitan Maḥzor: (1) El hekhal ḳodsho; (2) Le-bet el banu; (3) La-Adonai et yom ha-shevi'i berakh; (4) Meḥolel kol be-ḳav yashar; (5) Ezri yavi el me-'ayin; (6) 'Al rov 'avoni; (7) 'Ammekha le-shaḥarekha ḳamu; and (8) Ki bo Elohim dibber be-ḳodsho. No. 3 consists of thirteen strophes, and each of the others consists of five strophes. Nos. 3, 4, 7, and 8 are to be recited on the Sabbaths of the month of Elul. Nos. 3 and 8 are both mustajabs; in the former every strophe begins with "la-Adonai" and terminates with "Adonai," while in the latter the strophes begin with "ki bo" and rime in "to."
