= Yadlin affair =

1970s political corruption scandal in Israel

The Yadlin affair (Hebrew: פרשת ידלין, Parashat Yadlin) was a political corruption scandal that broke in Israel in 1976, involving senior members of the Labor Party (then the major faction in the Alignment). It is often seen as one of the reasons for the "revolution" of the 1977 elections.

== Background ==
In 1976, HaOlam HaZeh began publishing investigations regarding illegitimate financial transactions concerning senior members of the labor movement and the party funds. The names mentioned included Asher Yadlin, who was about to be appointed Governor of the Bank of Israel. Yadlin was known to be a gambling buff (favoring the Las Vegas roulette table) with an eye for pretty women. He was also a major fund raiser for the Labor Party; since 1973, he had headed Israel's huge Kupat Holim health-insurance program. The reports also mentioned Avraham Ofer, Yitzhak Rabin's Minister of Housing. The investigations suggested bribery, and the reporter Yigal Laviv pressed charges.

== Scandal ==
The cabinet decided, on September 5, to appoint Yadlin, former head of the Histadrut's economic enterprises, governor of the Bank of Israel to succeed Moshe Sanbar on November 1. On the day after the cabinet decision, Police Minister Shlomo Hillel and Attorney-General Aharon Barak were informed that the police had been inquiring into allegations against Yadlin of improper conduct in the management of Kupat Holim. Yadlin declared that the allegations were without basis and that he would welcome an investigation.

After a month of intensive police investigation, Yadlin was detained for interrogation on suspicion of having accepted bribes and undercover commissions in transactions affecting Kupat Holim. On October 24 the cabinet resolved, without prejudging the charges against Yadlin, that it could no longer delay the appointment, and named Director-General of the Treasury Arnon Gafni as governor of the Bank of Israel.

There was considerable criticism of the daily publicity by the press to unproven rumors of charges against Yadlin, which were believed to have been fed by unauthorized disclosures from police sources. In mid-December Yadlin was charged with taking bribes totaling IL280,000, as well as other offenses, and was remanded in custody until his trial. On March 14, 1977, Yadlin pleaded guilty to some of the charges, involving bribes totaling IL124,000, but claimed that he had handed over IL80,000 of the money to Labor party funds, adding that he had raised "millions" for the party. The judge did not accept his claim and sentenced him to five years' imprisonment and a fine of IL250,000. Further charges were to be investigated by the police after consideration of Yadlin's appeal.

== Aftermath ==
Towards the upcoming elections, Shimon Peres and his supporters had jumped on the Yadlin scandal as proof of Rabin's poor judgment in making appointments. For the left, it showed that the Labor Party had lost track of its ideological socialist roots. For the Israeli right, it was evidence of the Labor Party's corruption. It is widely regarded as one of the main causes of the Labor party's downfall in the elections.

Yadlin was released from prison in 1981 and subsequently emigrated to the United States. Talia Livni, Yadlin's common law wife, was a lawyer who assisted him in legal matters. She married him while he was in jail, but divorced him after he emigrated. Dalia, Yadlin's ex-wife, supported him and tried to present him as a pawn in the party's hands and as a victim of its "method".

Avraham Ofer, whose name was associated with the Yadlin affair as well as another one, committed suicide on January 3, 1977.

Barak was seen as a relentless fighter against corruption. He was later appointed to the Supreme Court of Israel. Some argue that his role in the Yadlin affair helped him carry out his famous judicial activist positions.

The "Yadlin House", a building in north Tel Aviv, whose construction was linked to the bribe money, remained unfinished. In 2005 it was sold and has since been demolished.
