= Basic Law: Israel as the Nation-State of the Jewish People =

Law passed by the Knesset in 2018

20th Knesset
- Long title: חוק יסוד: ישראל – מדינת הלאום של העם היהודי
- Territorial extent: Israel
- Enacted by: Knesset
- Enacted: 19 July 2018

Legislative history
- Introduced by: Avi Dichter; Avraham Neguise; Tali Ploskov; Moti Yogev; Yoav Kish; Nava Boker; Bezalel Smotrich; Orly Levy; Robert Ilatov; Dudi Amsalem; David Bitan; ~~Yinon Magal~~ Sponsorship automatically withdrawn; ceased to be an MK; ~~Eli Cohen~~ Sponsorship automatically withdrawn; became a minister ~~Hamad Amar~~ Withdrew sponsorship
- Preliminary reading: 10 May 2017
- First reading: 1 May 2018
- Second reading: 18 July 2018
- Third reading: 18 July 2018
- Voting summary: 62 voted for; 55 voted against; 2 abstained

Related legislation
- Basic Laws of Israel

Summary
- Defines Israel as the nation-state of the Jewish people
- Status: Current legislation

Basic Law: Israel as the Nation-State of the Jewish People (Hebrew: חוֹק יְסוֹד: יִשְׂרָאֵל—מְדִינַת הַלְּאוֹם שֶׁל הָעָם הַיְּהוּדִי), informally known as the Nation-State Bill (חוֹק הַלְּאוֹם) or the Nationality Bill, is an Israeli Basic Law that specifies the country's significance to the Jewish people. It was passed by the Knesset—with 62 in favour, 55 against, and two abstentions—on 19 July 2018 (7 Av 5778) and is largely symbolic and declarative in nature. The law outlines a number of roles and responsibilities by which Israel is bound in order to fulfill the purpose of serving as the Jews' nation-state. However, it was met with sharp backlash internationally and has been characterized as racist and undemocratic by some critics. After it was passed, several groups in the Jewish diaspora expressed concern that it was actively violating Israel's self-defined legal status as a "Jewish and democratic state" in exchange for adopting an exclusively Jewish identity. The European Union stated that the Nation-State Bill had complicated the Israeli–Palestinian peace process, while the Arab League, the Palestine Liberation Organization, the Organization of Islamic Cooperation, and the Muslim World League condemned it as a manifestation of apartheid.

Petitions were filed with the Supreme Court of Israel challenging the constitutionality of the law. In January 2019, the Supreme Court announced that such challenges would be heard by an 11-justice panel and would decide if the law, in whole or in part, violates Israel's Basic Law: Human Dignity and Liberty, which was passed by the Knesset with super-legal status in 1992. Additionally, the hearing would also be the first time that the Supreme Court addressed the question of whether it had the authority to strike down another Basic Law on the basis of threats to constitutionality.

In July 2021, the Supreme Court ruled that the law was constitutional and did not negate Israel's democratic character. Writing the opinion for the majority, Esther Hayut, the erstwhile President of the Supreme Court, stated that this "Basic Law is but one chapter in our constitution taking shape and it does not negate Israel's character as a democratic state." The court's majority opinion concurred with arguments that the law merely declares the obvious—that Israel is a Jewish state—and that this does not detract from the individual rights of non-Jewish citizens, especially in light of other laws that ensure equal rights to all.

== Legislation history ==
On 3 August 2011, the Chairman of the Foreign Affairs and Defense Committee, Avi Dichter, together with 39 other Knesset members, filed the Basic Law proposal: Israel as the Nation-State of the Jewish People which seeks to determine the nature of the state of Israel as the Jewish people, and as such it interprets the term "Jewish and democratic state" which appears in the Israeli basic laws Freedom of Occupation and Human Dignity and Liberty.

In July 2017, a special Joint committee headed by MK Amir Ohana (Likud) was formed to revive the Nation-State Bill, which was then approved for a first reading on 13 March 2018.

The committee oversaw a number of changes, mostly regarding articles such as the "Hebrew Law", "Ingathering of the Exiles", and "Jewish Settlement", replacing an earlier version that would have enabled the state to allow groups to establish separate communities "on the basis of religion and nationality" with a version that emphasised "developing Jewish communities a national value, and will act to encourage, promote, and establish them".

Upon presenting the reformed bill, Chairman Ohana stated: "This is the law of all laws. It is the most important law in the history of the State of Israel, which says that everyone has human rights, but national rights in Israel belong only to the Jewish people. That is the founding principle on which the state was established". Minister Yariv Levin, a strong backer of the proposal, called it "Zionism's flagship bill... it will bring order, clarify what is taken for granted, and put Israel back on the right path. A country that is different from all others in one way, that it is the nation-state of the Jewish people."

On 1 May 2018, the Knesset passed the Nation-State Bill, with a majority of 64 voting in favor of the bill and 50 against in its first reading. On 19 July 2018, after a stormy debate which lasted for hours, the Knesset approved the Nation-State Bill in second and third readings by a vote of 62 in favor, 55 against and two abstentions.

Following the vote, members of the Joint List tore up a printed text of the law while shouting out "Apartheid" on the floor of the Knesset. MKs from the coalition, on the other hand, applauded the passing of the legislation.

== Contents ==
The Basic Law comprises eleven clauses, as follows:

1. Basic Principles
  1. The land of Israel is the historical homeland of the Jewish people, in which the State of Israel was established.
  2. The State of Israel is the national home of the Jewish people, in which it fulfills its natural, cultural, religious, and historical right to self-determination.
  3. The right to exercise national self-determination in the State of Israel is unique to the Jewish people.
2. Symbols of the State
  1. The name of the state is "Israel".
  2. The state flag is white, with two blue stripes near the edges and a blue Star of David in the center.
  3. The state emblem is a seven-branched menorah with olive leaves on both sides and the word "Israel" beneath it.
  4. The state anthem is "Hatikvah".
  5. Details regarding state symbols will be determined by the law.
3. Capital of the State. Jerusalem, complete and united, is the capital of Israel.
4. Language
  1. The state's language is Hebrew.
  2. The Arabic language has a special status in the state; Regulating the use of Arabic in state institutions or by them will be set in law.
  3. This clause does not harm the status given to the Arabic language before this law came into effect.
5. Ingathering of the Exiles The state will be open for Jewish immigration and the ingathering of exiles.
6. Connection to the Jewish people
  1. The state will strive to ensure the safety of the members of the Jewish people and of its citizens in trouble or in captivity due to the fact of their Jewishness or their citizenship.
  2. The state shall act within the Diaspora to strengthen the affinity between the state and members of the Jewish people.
  3. The state shall act to preserve the cultural, historical, and religious heritage of the Jewish people among Jews in the Diaspora.
7. Jewish Settlement
  1. The state views the development of Jewish settlement as a national value and will act to encourage and promote its establishment and consolidation.
8. Official Calendar The Hebrew calendar is the official calendar of the state and alongside it the Gregorian calendar will be used as an official calendar. Use of the Hebrew calendar and the Gregorian calendar will be determined by law.
9. Independence Day and Memorial Days
  1. Independence Day is the official national holiday of the state.
  2. Memorial Day for the Fallen in Israel's Wars and Holocaust and Heroism Remembrance Day are official memorial days of the State.
10. Days of Rest and Sabbath The Sabbath and the festivals of Israel are the established days of rest in the state; Non-Jews have a right to maintain days of rest on their Sabbaths and festivals; Details of this issue will be determined by law.
11. Immutability This Basic Law shall not be amended, unless by another Basic Law passed by a majority of Knesset members.

== Litigation ==
In July 2018 Member of Knesset Akram Hasson (Kulanu) and other Israeli Druze officials filed a petition with the Supreme Court of Israel challenging the constitutionality of the law. This was followed in January 2019 by a petition filed by the Association for Civil Rights in Israel. The Supreme Court announced that challenges to the constitutionality of the law would be heard by an 11-justice panel and would decide if the law, in whole or in part, violates the Basic Law: Human Dignity and Liberty, considered the country's foundational legal basis. The hearing would be the first time the Supreme Court addressed the question of whether it has the authority to strike down another Basic Law in whole or in part on such a basis.

The Supreme Court issued its decision on the constitutionality of the law in July 2021. In a 10-1 ruling, the court declared that the law was constitutional and did not negate the state's democratic character. Writing the opinion for the majority, President of the Court, Esther Hayut, stated that "This basic law is but one chapter in our constitution taking shape and it does not negate Israel's character as a democratic state." The court's majority opinion concurred with arguments that the law merely declares the obvious—that Israel is a Jewish state—and that this does not detract from the individual rights of non-Jewish citizens, especially in light of other laws that ensure equal rights to all. The lone dissenting judge was Justice George Karra, an Arab member of the court.

In a separate case, in November 2020, an Israeli magistrate's court ruled, based on the law as justification, that the northern city of Karmiel was a "Jewish city", and that Arabic-language schools or funding transport for Arab schoolchildren would be liable to alter the city's demographic balance and damage its character. The ruling essentially blocked access to schools for Arab children in Karmiel. The court implied that facilitating this access would incentivize Palestinian Arab citizens of Israel to move into the city, thus damaging its "Jewish character." Israel's attorney general opposed the ruling and stated that the court had interpreted the law incorrectly. Upon appeal, the Haifa District Court ruled that the lower court's initial dismissal of the claims for funding and transportation were an inappropriate application of the Nation-State law, and called the decision "fundamentally wrong."

== Controversy ==
Controversy has surrounded the Basic Law since it was first proposed in 2011. Prominent Israeli political, especially from the left of the political spectrum, and academic figures, such as Professor Amnon Rubinstein, have been highly critical, and frequent references have been made to the potential harm that the passage of the law's bill could do to Israel's democracy and the rights of its minorities.

The proposal has even been criticized by people affiliated with the Israeli Right, such as the Minister and Likud Party MK Benny Begin. Critics have argued that the proposed law raises difficult questions concerning the definition of Israel as a Jewish and democratic state, and it may upset the delicate balance between the state's Jewish character and state's democratic character.

On 20 November 2011, a special discussion was held on the matter at the George Shultz Roundtable Forum which was sponsored by the Israeli Democracy Institute, and was attended by Avi Dichter and various Israeli public figures and prominent academic figures.

Prime Minister of Israel, Benjamin Netanyahu, defended his draft of the Nation-State bill on 26 November 2014, declaring Israel to be "The nation-state of the Jewish people, and the Jewish people alone". He also clarified: "I want a state of one nation: the Jewish nation-state, which includes non-Jews with equal rights." Being the land of the Jewish people, the PM is of the opinion that Israel is thus entitled to principles that combine the nation and the state of the Jewish people and grant "equal rights for all its citizens, without discrimination against religion, race, or sex".

In August 2011, several Knesset members who had initially signaled their support for the bill subsequently withdrew their support after controversy arose over the downgrading of the Arabic language and concerns that the bill would fail to properly enshrine minority rights.

MK Shlomo Molla (Kadima) conditioned his signature, stating: "Israel is the national home of the Jewish people, that much is clear. But at the same time, when we are the Jewish majority, the rights of the minority must also be enshrined in the Basic Law and they need legal protection. Without the completion of such a Basic Law, it has no moral validity. Nor will antagonism arise."

MK Avi Dichter (Likud) countered that the law only enshrined an existing situation, noting: "Court rulings deal constantly with the permanent status of the language: the Hebrew language is defined as a language with a higher status than the Arabic language, and as the state's official language. Arabic on the other hand suffers from constant blurring of its status and lack of clarity about its accessibility to the native speakers of the language. According to the bill proposal, the Arabic language would receive a special status which would require the state to enable accessibility to all native speakers of the language."

In an open letter, Reuven Rivlin, Israel's president, raised his concern over an earlier draft of the legislation, saying it "could harm the Jewish people worldwide and in Israel, and could even be used as a weapon by our enemies". To register his displeasure with the law, Rivlin, fulfilling his duty as president to sign all laws by the Knesset, signed his name in Arabic.

Responding to Arab legislators who objected to the proposed basic law, MK Avi Dichter, said that, "The most you can do is to live among us as a national minority that enjoys equal individual rights, but not equality as a national minority."

In an interview with Haaretz, Tourism Minister Yariv Levin, who supervised the passage of the law, said that, "Through the law, we can prevent family reunification [of Israeli citizens and Palestinians] not only out of security motives, but also motivated to maintain the character of the country as the national homeland of the Jewish people." He also insisted to reject the inclusion of equality in the legislation to avoid undermining the Law of Return.

== Reaction ==
=== In Israel ===
Retired Israeli Chief Justice Aharon Barak, who led the "constitutional revolution" that established judicial review in the 1990s, said that "This is an important law". Barak drew a distinction between national and civic rights: "The recognition of the minority rights of Israel's Arab citizens does not grant them a national right to self-determination within the State of Israel. They are a minority whose identity and culture must be protected, but if they want to realize their right to national self-determination, they can only do it in a state of their own, not in Israel." He also accepted the argument that the right to equality does not belong in this law, but insisted that it be made explicit (rather than just implied) in Basic Law: Human Dignity and Liberty.

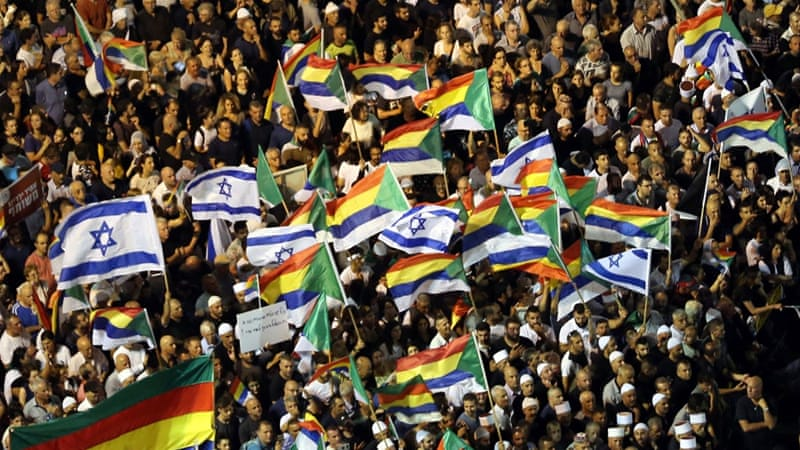
Druze flags alongside Israeli flags during a rally against the law in Tel Aviv on 4 August 2018

Heads of Israel's Druze community petitioned the Israeli Supreme Court in protest against the law, and 100 Druze reservists complained that though having fought in Israel's wars for generations, the bill relegated them to second-class status. According to Rami Zeedan, who is himself an Israeli Druze, the main problem in the law in the eyes of the Israeli Druze is ignoring the definition of "Israeli" as the nation of the state, while the Druze hold this as integral part of their social self- identification.

The Assembly of Catholic Ordinaries of the Holy Land asked the government to rescind the law.

When the law passed, Israeli Arab parliamentary members of the Joint List ripped up copies of the bill and shouted, “Apartheid,” on the floor of the Knesset. Ayman Odeh, the then leader of a coalition of primarily Arab parties in opposition, said in a statement that Israel had “passed a law of Jewish supremacy and told us that we will always be second-class citizens”.

Mass protests were held in Tel Aviv following the law, which critics labelled as racist towards the country's Arabs. In particular, many Arabs were angered by the law's downgrading of Arabic from an official language to one with an ambiguous "special status".

Palestinians, liberal American Jews, and many Israelis on the left denounced the law as racist and undemocratic, with Yohanan Plesner, the head of the non-partisan Israel Democracy Institute, calling the new law “jingoistic and divisive” and an “unnecessary embarrassment to Israel”.

Likud MK Benny Begin, son of the party's co-founder Menachem Begin, expressed his concern about the direction of his party; in his opinion, it is moving a little further away from human rights. The Adalah Legal Center for Arab Minority Rights in Israel said that the law "contains key elements of apartheid", which is not only immoral, but absolutely prohibited under international law". Adalah Director Hassan Jabareen said that the law would make Israel an exclusively Jewish country, which "made discrimination a constitutional value and made its attachment to favouring Jewish supremacy the reason for its institutions".

Shimon Stein and Moshe Zimmermann commented that the new law calls into question the equality of Arabs living in Israel concerning the loss of Arabic's status as an official language, also claiming that "only" the country's Jewish settlements and Jewish immigration are considered fundamental values. They claimed that the law, beginning with the clause: "The land of Israel is the historical homeland of the Jewish people, in which the State of Israel was established", and lacking any mention of any other people within the land or of borders, opens up a loophole for annexation of the West Bank and a goodbye to the two-state solution and democracy.

Eugene Kontorovich published an article on the proposed law in which he compared it to the situation in many European nation-states, and found that seven member states of the European Union "have constitutional 'nationhood' provisions, which typically speak of the state as being the national home and locus of self-determination for the country's majority ethnic group". He supported this claim with two detailed examples, Latvia and Slovakia, stating that in the light of this, the proposed bill in Israel had "nothing racist, or even unusual, about having national or religious character reflected in constitutional commitments" and concluded that "it is hard to understand why what works for them should be so widely denounced when it comes to Israel."

Ayman Odeh, head of the Joint List party, condemned the law, seeing it as "the death of democracy".

Israeli Prime Minister Netanyahu responded that the civil rights of every Israeli citizen is guaranteed in a series of Knesset laws, including Basic Law: Human Dignity and Liberty, but the national rights of the Jewish people in Israel had not been enshrined by law until now.

In response to complaints from the Druze community, Netanyahu stated in a subsequent cabinet meeting: "In contrast to the outrageous comments from the left attacking the Jewish state, I was touched by the sentiments of our brothers and sisters in the Druze community", and committed to meeting with Druze leaders to find solutions to their concerns. Initial meetings with Druze leaders fell apart, however, when Netanyahu walked out after one Druze leader refused Netanyahu's demand that he take back his use of the term "apartheid" to refer to the law on social media. Some Druze participants suggested that Netanyahu had deliberately torpedoed the meeting when he saw that they would not endorse cosmetic changes to the law.

A poll conducted by Panel Politics found that 58% of Israeli Jews support the law, 34% are against and 8% have no opinion (among 532 responses). The poll found more support among people who define themselves as right-wing or centrist, while leftists are more likely to oppose it. A survey, conducted by the Israeli Democracy Institute and based on the replies of 600 Israelis, showed that the majority of the public, 59.6% of Jews and 72.5% of Arabs, believe that equality for all Israeli citizens should have been also covered by the law.

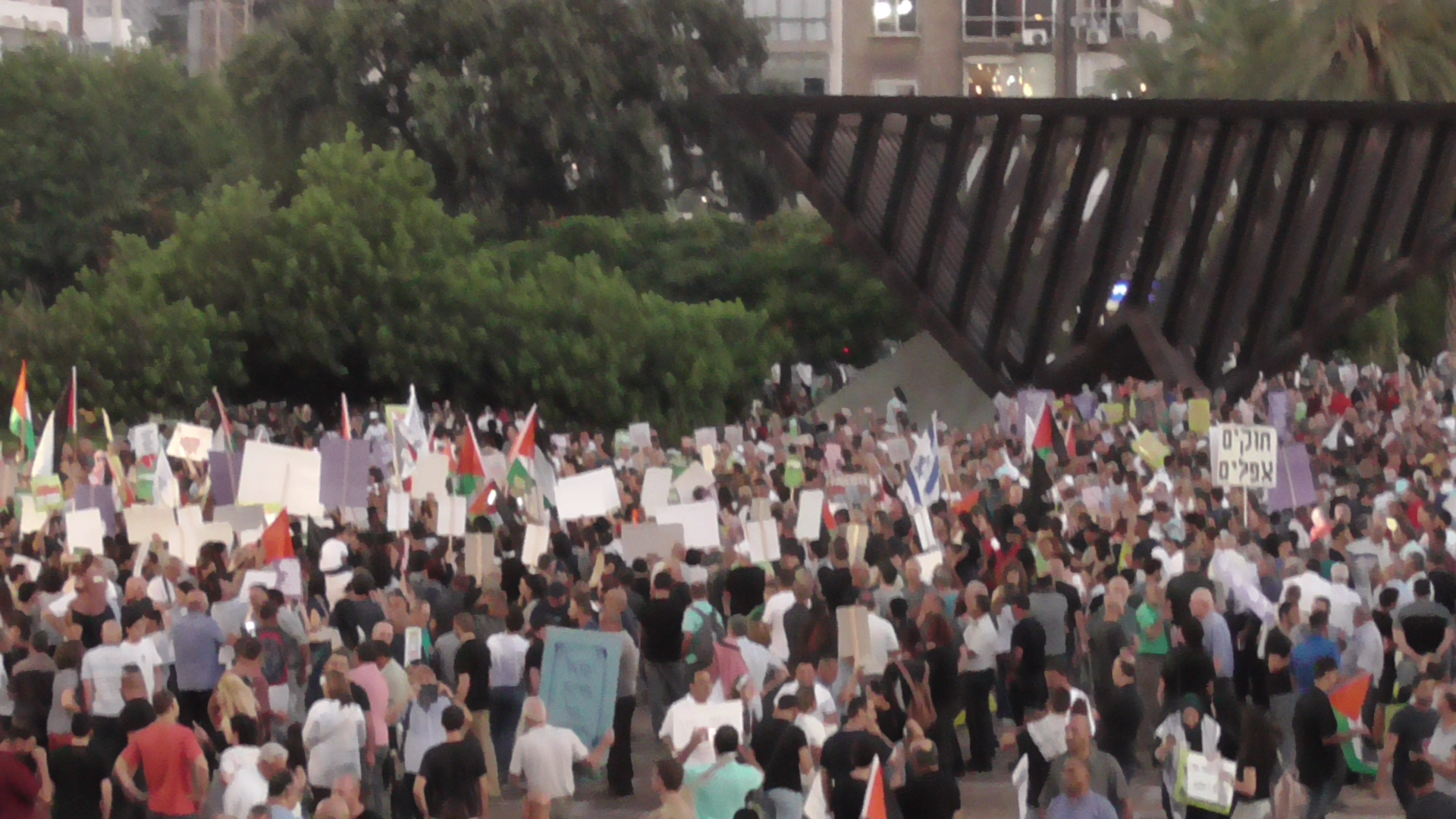
Israeli Arabs and their supporters rally with Palestinian flags against the law in Tel Aviv on 11 August 2018.

In response to the presence of Palestinian flags during a protest against the law in Tel Aviv, Netanyahu said: "There is no greater testament to the necessity of this law. We will continue to wave the Israeli flag and sing Hatikvah with great pride."

=== Outside Israel ===
The secretary-general of the Palestine Liberation Organization, Saeb Erekat, described it as a "dangerous and racist law" which "officially legalizes apartheid and legally defines Israel as an apartheid system".

Backlash abroad has shown disapproval of the law by Jewish groups, with the American Jewish Committee stating the law "put at risk the commitment of Israel's founders to build a country that is both Jewish and democratic". Additionally, Jonathan Greenblatt, CEO of the Anti-Defamation League (ADL), said: "While there are provisions that we agree with—notably with regard to state symbols like the anthem, flag, and capital Jerusalem; as well as in re-affirming that the State of Israel is open to Jewish immigration—we are troubled by the fact that the law, which celebrates the fundamental Jewish nature of the state, raises significant questions about the government's long-term commitment to its pluralistic identity and democratic nature."

The European Union expressed concern over the passing of the law, saying it would "complicate a two-state solution to the Israel-Palestinian conflict".

Turkish President Recep Tayyip Erdoğan, while addressing Grand National Assembly MPs in Ankara, said that the "spirit of Hitler" lives on in Israel, commenting specifically that he believes "no difference [exists] between Hitler's obsession with a pure race and the understanding that these ancient lands are just for the Jews." He also called Israel "the world's most Zionist, fascist, racist state." The statements were condemned by Israeli prime minister Benjamin Netanyahu, who described Erdoğan's rule as "a dark dictatorship" and stated that Erdoğan "is massacring Syrians and Kurds and has jailed tens of thousands of his own citizens." In addition, Israel considers comparisons of its government with the Nazi regime as an egregious insult.

== See also ==
- Constitution of Israel
- Homeland for the Jewish people
- Israeli Nationality Law of 1952
- Jewish and democratic state
