= Jewish state =

Synonym for Israel in global politics

The term "Jewish state" has widely been used as a synonym for Israel since its establishment in 1948. Establishing a Jewish homeland in Palestine was the goal of Zionism, a nationalist movement that emerged in Europe in the late 19th century.

Theodor Herzl's 1896 book Der Judenstaat ( 'The Jew State' or 'The Jews' State' in German) is often translated into English as The Jewish State. The Zionist Organization used the term 'national home'. The 1917 Balfour Declaration used the phrase "a national home for the Jewish people" in announcing the British government's support.

The May 14, 1948 Declaration of the Establishment of the State of Israel formally declared the country's significance to Jews. Additionally, several Basic Laws of Israel collectively define it as a "Jewish and democratic state" in an official capacity. Israel is home to roughly half of the world's Jews, making it the only country in which Jews comprise more than 2.5% of the total population.

The "Jewish" definition of Israel's role and character as a state has generated internal and external debate on the secular–religious status quo (though Israel is not a Halakhic state), the status of Israelis who belong to the non-Jewish minority, and the legal and practical implications of integrating such a definition on the Israeli–Palestinian conflict.

== Overview ==
=== Early Zionist thought ===
In the pre-modern era, Jewish religious law defined a number of prerogatives for a Halakhic state. When Theodor Herzl published Der Judenstaat in 1896, he envisioned a secular state based on European models, which included religious institutions under the aegis of the state. In order to avoid alienating the Ottoman sultan, there was no explicit reference to Jewish statehood by the World Zionist Organization (WZO) that he founded in 1897. Instead, the phrase "national home" was used intentionally. Although Herzl's school of thought—that of political Zionism—grew to be the most widespread and successful in the Zionist movement, there were several types of Jewish nationalism that advocated other methods by which the Jewish national home could be realized.

=== Homeland for the Jewish people ===
The 1917 Balfour Declaration referred to "the establishment in Palestine of a national home for the Jewish people" and the 1922 Churchill White Paper clarified that "Phrases have been used such as that Palestine is to become 'as Jewish as England is English.' His Majesty's Government regard any such expectation as impracticable and have no such aim in view. They would draw attention to the fact that the terms of the Declaration referred to do not contemplate that Palestine as a whole should be converted into a Jewish National Home, but that such a Home should be founded 'in Palestine.'"

The 1942 Biltmore Program of the WZO proposed "that Palestine be established as a Jewish Commonwealth." In 1946, however, the Anglo-American Committee of Inquiry (also known as the Grady–Morrison Committee) noted that the demand for a Jewish state went beyond the obligations of either the Balfour Declaration or the British Mandate for Palestine, and that it had been expressly disowned by the Jewish Agency for Palestine as recently as 1932.

The concept of a Jewish state was juxtaposed with an Arab state in the 1947 United Nations Partition Plan for Palestine, which also marked Jerusalem as an international zone under the sovereignty of neither state. While the Partition Plan was adopted by a majority vote, it was never implemented due to the 1948 Palestine war.

==== Realization with the State of Israel ====
Modern Israel was founded on 14 May 1948, when it was explicitly declared as an independent Jewish state assuming full responsibility for all Palestinian Jews. This principle was given further legal effect in the Law of Return, which was passed by the Knesset on 5 July 1950, stating that "Every Jew has the right to come to this country as an oleh." In 1970, it was modified to include non-Jewish people with at least one Jewish grandparent. Thus, the Law of Return enables qualified Jewish and non-Jewish immigrants of Jewish descent (as well as their spouses and children) to gain Israeli citizenship.

=== Israel as "the Jewish state" ===
The phrase "Jewish state" is often used in global media (especially Western media) and politics to describe Israel. American presidents George W. Bush and Barack Obama are among notable politicians who have referred to Israel as a Jewish state at an international level during their tenures. One of the conditions set by Israel for the Israeli–Palestinian peace process entails the Palestinians' recognition of Israel as a Jewish state. However, this condition has been regarded by Palestinian politicians as a diplomatic trap that would jeopardize the Palestinian right of return, citing the fact that it was never discussed in early Israeli–Palestinian negotiations and also not demanded in Israel's peace treaties with Egypt and with Jordan. In 1993, Israel and the Palestine Liberation Organization exchanged the Letters of Mutual Recognition, whereby the PLO recognized Israel as a sovereign state to proceed with the Oslo Accords. Since the 1990s, successive Israeli governments have maintained an official stance asserting that the Palestinians must explicitly recognize Israel as a Jewish state.

==== Secular–religious status quo ====
Israel does not have a state religion. However, the definition of the state as Jewish in character creates a strong connection, but also a conflict, between secular state law and Jewish religious law. Political interaction of different parties keeps the balance between state and religion largely as it existed during the British Mandate period. The 2003 Gavison–Medan Covenant is a controversial proposal for reforming Israel's status quo in order to reinforce the state's Jewish character in a way that minimizes religious coercion.

On 19 July 2018, with a vote of 62 in favour to 55 against (and two abstaining), the Knesset adopted the Basic Law: Israel as the Nation-State of the Jewish People. The Basic Law was met with opposition internationally, including in the Jewish diaspora and in statements by many of Israel's allies, who questioned whether it was consistent with Israel's commitment to exist as a "Jewish and democratic state" (violating the democratic principle) and whether it was negatively impacting the Israeli–Palestinian peace process.

=== Israel as a "halachic state" ===
The concept of a "halachic state" is a hypothetical state whose government is structured in accordance with the Torah. Proponents of Israel as a halachic state include ultra-orthodox Jews, who advocate a policy where all decisions are made by "Torah sages". However, others argue that, if Israel was a halachic state, the country would make it impossible for anyone other than a religious fanatic to live in it.

== Internal debate ==
There has been ongoing debate in Israel on the character of the state, regarding whether it should enshrine more Jewish culture, encourage Judaism in schools, and enshrine certain laws of Kashrut and Shabbat observance. This debate reflects a historical divide within Zionism and among the Jewish citizens of Israel, which has large secular and traditional/Orthodox minorities as well as a majority which lies somewhere in between.

On 19 November 2008, Israeli Foreign Minister Tzipi Livni addressed the United Jewish Communities General Assembly in Jerusalem. In her speech, she announced: "These two goals of Israel as a Jewish and a democratic state must coexist and not contradict each other. So, what does that mean, a Jewish state? It is not only a matter of the number of Jews who live in Israel. It is not just a matter of numbers but a matter of values. The Jewish state is a matter of values, but it is not just a matter of religion, it is also a matter of nationality. And a Jewish state is not a monopoly of rabbis. It is not. It is about the nature of the State of Israel. It is about Jewish tradition. It is about Jewish history, regardless of the question of what each and every Israeli citizen does in his own home on Saturdays and what he does on the Jewish holidays. We need to maintain the nature of the State of Israel, the character of the State of Israel, because this is the raison d'être of the State of Israel."

== Criticism ==
=== Impact on the Israeli–Palestinian peace process ===
A poll commissioned by the Israel Democracy Institute in 2007 found that 75% of Arab-Israelis would support a constitution that maintained Israel as a Jewish and democratic state with equal minority rights. Among the 507 people who participated in the poll, some 75 percent said they would agree with such a definition while 23 percent said they would oppose it.

=== Jewish homeland vs. statehood ===
Linguist and political commentator Noam Chomsky makes a distinction between the concept of "a Jewish ethnic homeland in Palestine" and that of "a Jewish state" in his interview on C-SPAN, saying that he has always supported a Jewish ethnic homeland in Palestine, which is different from a Jewish state. He says that there is a strong case to be made for an ethnic homeland, but he has always been opposed to a Jewish state, for the same reasons he would be opposed to "a Christian state, or a White state, or an Islamic republic". Chomsky believes the concept of a Jewish State (or Muslim, Christian or White State) directly contradicts the concept of a democratic state as it is understood in the Western tradition, because liberal democracy is founded upon a principle in which there is no privileged citizen.

== Other states ==
The first Jewish state in history is thought to be the United Kingdom of Israel, which was established by King David, although some historians, such as Israel Finkelstein, believe that that state may not have existed as a "full-blown state", but rather as a sort of "chiefdom". The first modern Jewish state was the Jewish Autonomous Oblast, which was established by the Soviet Union.

== See also ==
- History of the Jews and Judaism in the Land of Israel
- Homeland for the Jewish people
  - Proposals for a Jewish state
- Types of Zionism
