= Halachic state =

Jewish state governed by Jewish religious law

The term "halachic state" (Note: Alternatively transliterated as halakhic.) (Hebrew: מְדִינַת הֲלָכָה, romanized: Medīnat Hălāḵā) refers to a sovereign state that endorses Judaism in an official capacity and governs by Jewish law (Halakha). It has been a subject of discussion among Orthodox Jews, particularly with regard to modern Israel, which, although a Jewish state, is not classified as a theocracy. A number of Israeli politicians who identify as Orthodox have publicly voiced their support for Israel's transformation into a halachic state, but this position has not gained significant traction in the country's legal system or among the majority of Israelis.

== Public opinion in Israel ==
Can Israel both be a democracy and a Jewish state?
All Israeli Jews	Yes	76%
All Israeli Jews	No	20%
Haredi ("ultra-Orthodox")	Yes	58%
Haredi ("ultra-Orthodox")	No	36%
Dati (Orthodox)	Yes	79%
Dati (Orthodox)	No	17%
Masorti (traditional)	Yes	80%
Masorti (traditional)	No	15%
Hiloni (secular)	Yes	76%
Hiloni (secular)	No	21%
% of Israeli Jews who say Israel can be both a democracy and a Jewish state (Pew 2016).

Should halakha or democratic principles precede?
All Israeli Jews	Democracy	62%
All Israeli Jews	Halakha	24%
Haredi ("ultra-Orthodox")	Democracy	3%
Haredi ("ultra-Orthodox")	Halakha	89%
Dati (Orthodox)	Democracy	11%
Dati (Orthodox)	Halakha	65%
Masorti (traditional)	Democracy	56%
Masorti (traditional)	Halakha	23%
Hiloni (secular)	Democracy	89%
Hiloni (secular)	Halakha	1%
% of Israeli Jews who say halakha (Jewish religious law) or democratic principles should be given preference if there is a contradiction between the two (Pew 2016).

=== Across Jewish society ===
An opinion poll released by the Pew Research Center in March 2016 found high support among religious Jews for a halachic Israel: 89% of Haredi Jews and 65% of non-Haredi Orthodox Jews supported basing Israel's legal code on the Torah and Jewish religious law; while only 23% of traditionalist Jews and 1% of secular Jews supported such a move. At the time, Haredi Jews constituted 8% of all Israelis, non-Haredi Orthodox Jews constituted 10%, traditionalist Jews constituted 23%, and secular Jews constituted 40%. However, there was a majority agreement among all Jewish groups that Israel could be both a Jewish and democratic state. When asked whether they would prefer democratic principles or Jewish religious law if the two ever came into conflict, 62% of all Jews combined favoured democratic principles. Preference for Jewish religious law was very high among Haredi Jews (89%) and very low among secular Jews (1%).

=== Among Jewish religious leaders ===
Menachem Mendel Schneerson advocated the transformation of Israel into a halachic state even before the coming of the Hebrew Messiah.

=== State of Judea ===
Following the PLO's Declaration of Independence in the West Bank and the Gaza Strip on 15 November 1988, a movement emerged among some Kahanists advocating for a separate and halachic "State of Judea" to be established in the West Bank in the event that Israel no longer occupied it. Kahanist parties have been outlawed by Israel and designated as terrorist entities by the United States and Canada, but followers of the ideology continue to exist in relatively smaller numbers across various Israeli settlements, and the idea has intermittently re-emerged in the aftermath of significant political developments in the Israeli–Palestinian conflict, such as Israel's disengagement from the Gaza Strip in 2005.

== In Israel's government ==
In 2009, Justice Minister Yaakov Neeman stated that "step by step, Torah law will become the binding law in the State of Israel. We have to reinstate the traditions of our forefathers, the teaching of the rabbis of the ages, because these offer a solution to all the issues we are dealing with today". He later retracted his statement. According to 2002 Israel Prize winner Nahum Rakover, who received the Yakir Yerushalayim prize for his research on the use of Jewish law in the legal system, Neeman's opinion was nothing new. He said that the idea is supported in the Foundations of Law Act, passed in 1980, which encourages judges to use Jewish law in their decisions. Yitzhak Kahan, former president of the Israeli Supreme Court, recommended that Jewish law be implemented even in cases of an existing precedent, although his opinion was not accepted, and former justice ministers Shmuel Tamir and Moshe Nissim advocated teaching judges and lawyers Jewish law to provide them with the necessary knowledge to implement the law.

In June 2019, Tkuma leader Bezalel Smotrich campaigned for the Ministry of Justice, saying that he sought the portfolio to "restore the Torah justice system". Prime Minister Benjamin Netanyahu distanced himself from the comments, and appointed openly gay MK Amir Ohana to the post.

In August 2019, Smotrich stated: "We [Orthodox Jews] all would want the State of Israel to be run according to the Torah and Jewish law, it's just that we can't because there are people who think differently from us, and we have to get along with them."

=== Nation-State Bill (2018) ===
In 2014, Israel's cabinet advanced the Nation-State Bill, which defined Israel as "the nation-state of the Jewish people" and also said that Jewish law would be a "source of inspiration" for the Knesset. This was seen by some non-Orthodox Jews as a step toward enforcing Orthodox halakha as the law of the land. However, the final version of the law did not include this proposed clause.

== See also ==
- Christian state
  - Theonomy
- Islamic state
  - Sharia
