= Amnon Rubinstein =

Israeli politician (1931–2024)

- אמנון רובינשטיין
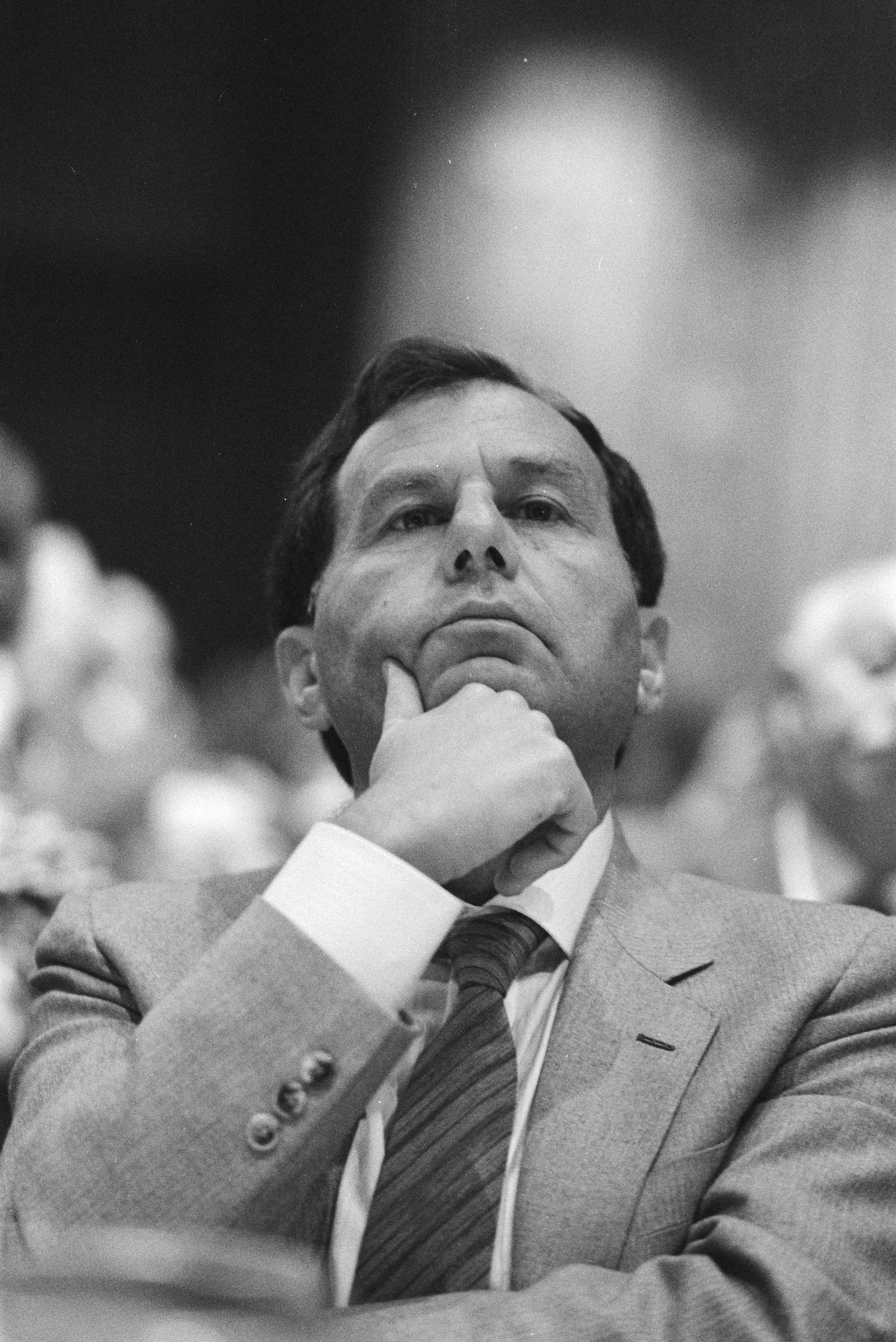
- Rubinstein in 1982

Ministerial roles
- 1984–1987: Minister of Communications
- 1992: Minister of Science & Technology
- 1992–1993: Minister of Energy & Infrastructure
- 1993–1996: Minister of Education, Culture & Sport

Faction represented in the Knesset
- 1977–1978: Democratic Movement for Change
- 1977–1992: Shinui
- 1992–2002: Meretz

Personal details
- Born: 5 September 1931 Tel Aviv, Mandatory Palestine
- Died: 18 January 2024 (aged 92) Tel Aviv, Israel
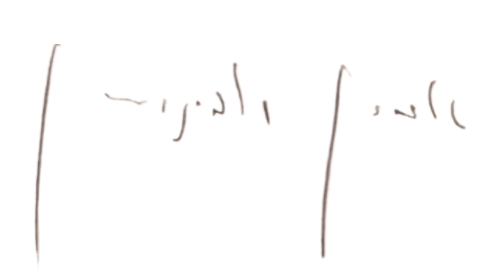
- Signature

Amnon Rubinstein (Hebrew: אמנון רובינשטיין; 5 September 1931 – 18 January 2024) was an Israeli legal scholar, politician and recipient of the Israel Prize. A member of the Knesset between 1977 and 2002, he served in several ministerial positions. He is referred to as the “founding father of Israeli Constitutional Law” In later life he was dean of the Interdisciplinary Center (IDC) in Herzliya and a patron of Liberal International.

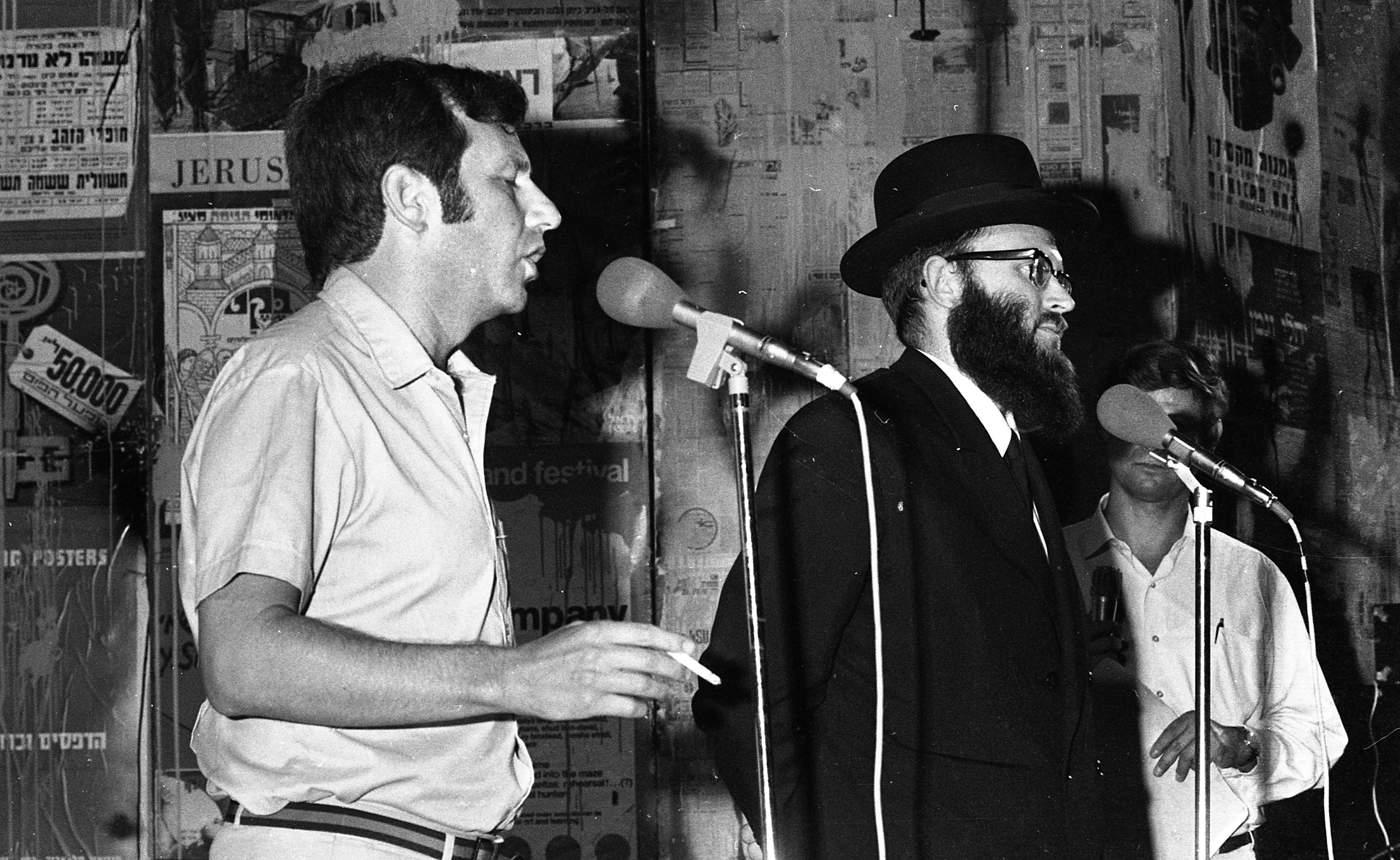
Amnon Rubinstein (left), 1969

== Biography ==
Rubinstein was born in Tel Aviv to Aharon, a building contractor and founder of the "Rubinstein Group", and Rachel, who immigrated from Poland to Israel in the early 1920s. His family opposed Labor Zionism and in his youth, he supported the Irgun. Rubinstein was active in public life from a young age. In the early 1950s, he was a member of the Volunteers' Row, a public organization aimed at fighting corruption and helping new immigrants. He attended the Geula Commercial High School in Tel Aviv and later at a high school in Baltimore, United States. During his mandatory service in the Israel Defense Forces, he served as an officer in the Artillery Corps. He later retrained and served in the anti-aircraft unit, continuing his service there in the reserves.

After his military service, Rubinstein studied in law, economics, and international relations at the Hebrew University of Jerusalem. He did his legal internship at the State Attorney's Office and also with attorney Haim Yosef Zadok, who later became the Minister of Justice. Rubinstein was licensed as a lawyer in 1961. He received his Ph.D. in law from the London School of Economics in 1960. His doctoral dissertation, titled "Void and Voidable Actions in Administrative Law", was published as a book by Oxford University Press.

At the age of 25, during his studies, Rubinstein married Roni, a fellow student and granddaughter of Jacob and Perla Shlush, founders of Tel Aviv. They met at Kibbutz Afikim during fortification work prior to the Suez Crisis. Roni later became a lawyer, and the couple had a son and a daughter.

=== Political career ===
Rubinstein returned to public activism after the Yom Kippur War. In March 1974, he co-founded the Shinui Party. Shinui merged with other liberal groups to form Democratic Movement for Change (Dash) in November 1976. Dash won 15 seats in the 1977 elections, but did not achieve its aim of being a decisive political force as Menachem Begin formed a government without its support. When Dash joined Begin’s government in November of that year, Rubinstein refused to join the coalition, arguing that its platform was insufficiently represented in the agreement.

Dash split into three parties on September 14, 1978. Rubinstein led a faction called the Movement for Change and Initiative, later renamed Shinui – Center Party. The new Shinui was elected to the 10th Knesset, the 11th Knesset, and the 12th Knesset. In 1992, Shinui merged with the Ratz and Mapam parties to form Meretz.

Rubinstein significantly advanced the Israeli Constitution Project. During the 12th Knesset, he initiated the proposal for the Basic Law on Human Rights and suggested splitting it into four separate proposals, including the Basic Law: Human Dignity and Liberty and the Basic Law: Freedom of Occupation. This strategy led to the successful passage of both laws.

Elected to the 9th Knesset in the 1977 elections, Rubinstein served continuously until 2002. He held various leadership roles, including chairing the Constitution, Law and Justice Committee (in the 15th Knesset), the Economic Affairs Committee (in the 14th Knesset), and the State Control Committee (in the 15th Knesset). He was also a member of the Judicial Selection Committee.

In 1999, Avraham Burg, the Speaker of the Knesset, received a false message from Zalman Shoshi claiming that Rubinstein had died. In response, the Knesset members held a moment of silence in Rubinstein's memory, despite the fact that he was still alive. During the session, Burg delivered a eulogy and recited the El Malei Rachamim.

Rubinstein announced his resignation from the Knesset in July 2002, which took effect in October of that year.

Rubinstein was a Liberal International patron and previously served as a vice president of the organization.

==== In the Government ====
In 1984, Rubinstein was appointed Minister of Communications in the National Unity Government led by Shimon Peres. He held this position until 1987, serving in the 21st and 22nd Israeli governments. During his tenure, he introduced several reforms, including the establishment of commercial television, cable television, and regional radio stations.

Following the 1992 elections and the formation of Yitzhak Rabin's government, Rubinstein was appointed Minister of Science and Technology and Minister of Energy and Infrastructure. During this period, he initiated the Electricity Sector Law, 1996, which led to the creation of the Public Utilities Authority – Electricity. He also worked to introduce competition in the fuel industry by breaking the monopoly of fuel companies on imports.

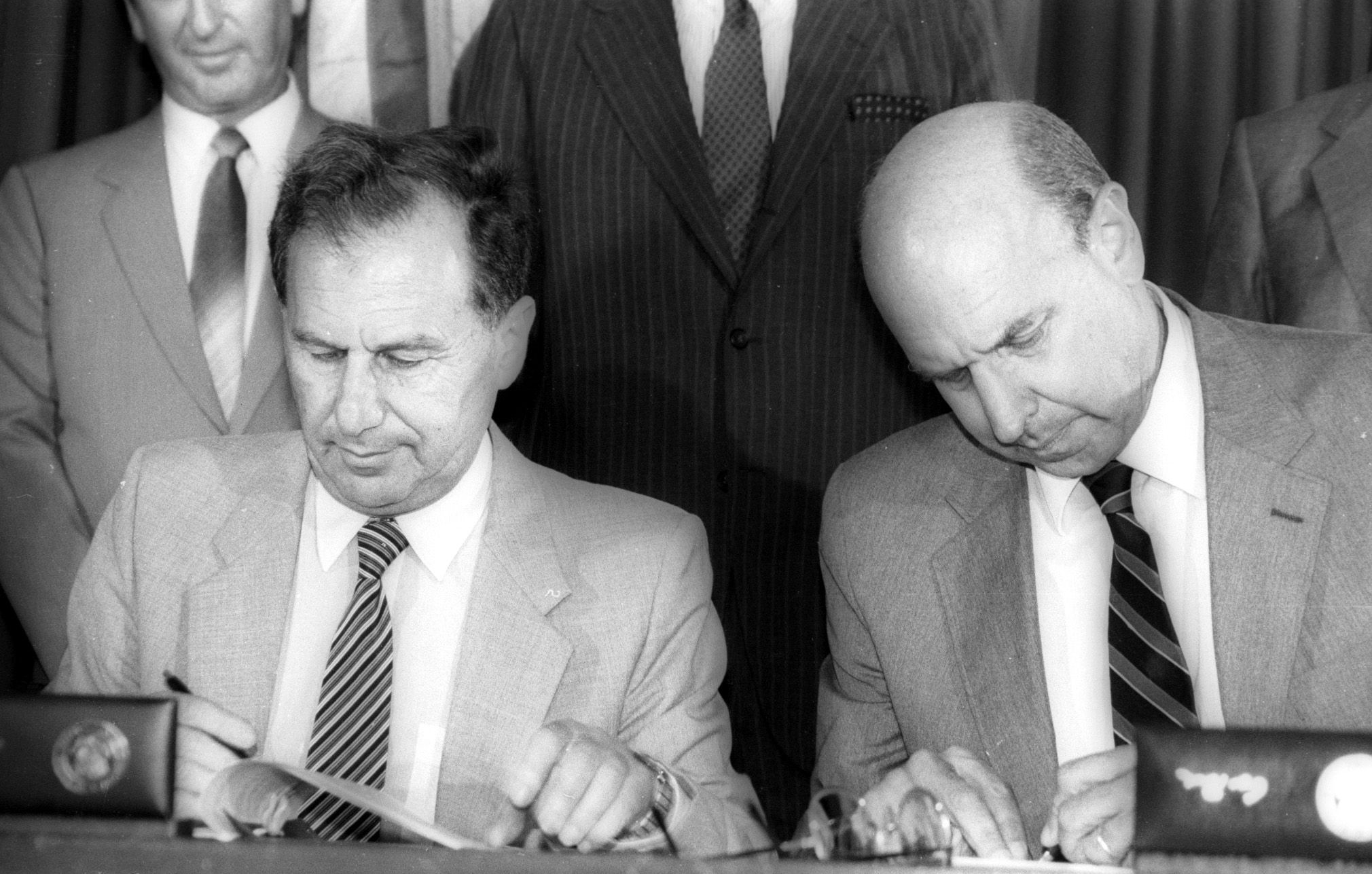
Amnon Rubinstein signing an agreement with U.S. Ambassador Thomas Pickering, 1986. From the Dan Hadani Collection at the National Library of Israel.

In 1994, Rubinstein was appointed Minister of Education, Culture, and Sport after Shulamit Aloni's resignation. He held the position until 1996. As Minister of Education, Rubinstein gained popularity for his liberal views, particularly on high school matriculation exams and his criticism of the Psychometric Entrance Test, remarking that he might not have been able to study law had such a test existed during his time.

Rubinstein introduced two major reforms during his tenure. The first focused on restructuring matriculation exams. Under his leadership, the Ministry of Education increased the matriculation pass rate by implementing measures such as eliminating external exams for some core subjects. Between 1994 and 1996, the matriculation eligibility rate rose by over 5%, reaching approximately 45% of each student cohort.

The second reform involved the establishment of academic colleges. This initiative included both state-funded institutions, such as the Tel Aviv–Yafo Academic College, and privately funded ones, like the Interdisciplinary Center Herzliya.

After retiring from politics, Rubinstein became a vocal critic of the Israeli left. He accused the left of becoming increasingly radical in efforts to accommodate Palestinian rights. Following the signing of the Geneva Initiative by then-Meretz leader Yossi Beilin, Rubinstein left Meretz, opposing its compromise on the Law of Return.

In 2007, during a legal debate over proposed judicial reforms by Justice Minister Daniel Friedmann, Rubinstein supported several of Friedmann's initiatives. He co-initiated a petition endorsing these reforms, stating:

"My aim was to dispel the impression that the professors in the universities had created, as if the entire academia opposed Friedmann's initiatives. Every matter should be examined on its own merit, not through personal attacks."

=== Academic career ===
In 1963, Rubinstein became the first dean of the Faculty of Law at Tel Aviv University, a position he held until 1970. His research focused on the constitutional law of Israel, exploring topics such as the state's nature, Zionism, the status of the Law of Return, and the civil rights of Palestinian citizens of Israel. In 2006, Rubinstein was awarded the Israel Prize for legal research. The judging panel described him as:

"The father of Israeli constitutional law. Through his deep academic writing and diverse public activities, he promotes democracy, equality, and human rights. Few can match his contribution to the state of Israel as Prof. Amnon Rubinstein – as a public figure, as a member of the legislative and executive branches, as a researcher, and as a brilliant jurist."

After retiring from the Knesset in 2002, Rubinstein served as the dean of the Radzyner School of Law at the Interdisciplinary Center Herzliya from 2002 to 2004 and briefly as the president of the Interdisciplinary Center.

He also held positions as a visiting professor at international academic institutions, including Stanford University and Columbia University.

=== Journalism and literature ===
Rubinstein had a media career as a columnist and commentator. In the 1960s, he wrote articles criticizing religious coercion and concessions made to religious political parties. He gained fame as a popular columnist and interviewee. Between 1969 and 1972, he hosted a debate program on Israel Educational Television titled Boomerang. From 1964 until 2004, he was a member of the editorial board of Haaretz and a regular contributor, focusing on issues of religion and state and addressing antisemitism, particularly that which he attributed to the political left in Europe. He also wrote regularly for the Ma'ariv weekend supplement and international publications, including The New York Times.

In 2005, Rubinstein published his first novel, The Blanket, which explored interconnected stories of Israeli characters from pre-state days to the present, addressing central themes in Israeli society. He followed this with Highway No. 5 (2006), The Sea Above Us (2007), Separate Entrance (2009), and Forbidden Loves (2010). In 2022, he published the futuristic novel Methuselah.

Rubinstein hosted a radio program on Kol HaMusika, A Musical Morning for Truck and Bus Drivers, from 2014 to 2015.

Rubinstein wrote extensively on the investigation and prosecution of public figures in Israel, arguing that enforcement bodies wield excessive and unchecked power over elected officials. He highlighted cases where such power appeared to have been misused.

=== Later years and death ===
In 2020, Rubinstein participated in The Future Archive, a documentation project highlighting the generation of intellectuals who significantly influenced early Israeli culture.

Rubinstein lived in Tel Aviv and died on January 18, 2024. He was survived by a son and a daughter.

== Awards ==
In 2006, Rubinstein won the Israel Prize, for law. The Israel Prize award committee provided the following endorsement for its decision:

"[Amnon Rubinstein is] the founding father of Israeli constitutional law… In the legal and public arena in Israel, there are few who can equal Prof. Amnon Rubinstein’s contribution to the State of Israel…"

In 2003, Rubinstein was named a Knight of Quality Government in the Lifetime Achievement category by the Movement for Quality Government.

He received the Hashin Prize for Academic Excellence in Law in 2010, the Gorney Prize for Public Law (2016) for his contribution to public law, the ISEF Award for social contribution in 2013, the Herzog Prize for unique contributions to Israel (2018), and the Ramat Gan Literary Award (2015). In 2022, he was awarded the EMET Prize for Law.

In 2022, the "Rubinstein Center for Constitutional Challenges" was established in his name at Reichman University.

== Selected works by Amnon Rubinstein ==
Non-fiction books:

- 1965: Jurisdiction and Illegality (Oxford University Press) (English)
- 1969: The Constitutional Law of the State of Israel, Schocken Publishing House (sixth edition published in 2005 with Dr. Barak Medina). (Hebrew)
- 1975: Enforcing Morality in a Permissive Society, Schocken Publishing. (Hebrew)
- 1997: From Herzl to Rabin and Beyond, Schocken Publishing. (Hebrew)
- 1998: A Certain Political Experience, Yedioth Ahronoth Publishing. (Hebrew)
- 1982: From Herzl to Gush Emunim and Back Again, Schocken Publishing. (Hebrew)
- 1984: The Zionist Dream Revisited, Schocken Books, New York, and Calmann-Lévy, Paris (English) (also published in French).
- 1993: Basic Law: The Knesset, in the series Interpretation of the Basic Laws, Harry Sacker Institute, with Ran Har-Zahav. (Hebrew)
- 2000: From Herzl to Rabin: The Changing Image of Zionism, Holmes & Meier Publishers, New York (English) (also published in Russian).
- 2001: History of Zionism: From Theodor Herzl to Today. (Hebrew)
- 2001: Daat Yachid, Schocken Publishing. (Hebrew)
- 2003: Israel and the Family of Nations (with Alexander Yakobson), Schocken Publishing. (Hebrew)
- 2009: Israel and the Family of Nations – (with Alexander Yakobson), Routledge, London (English) (also published in French).
- 2012: Without Government – How to Fix the System’s Faults (with Adam Wolfson), Zmora-Bitan Publishing. (Hebrew)
- 2014: Cracks in the Academy: Academic Freedom, University Independence, Student Status, and the Right to Higher Education (with Yitzhak Pasha), Nevo Publishing and Dvir Publishing. (Hebrew)
- 2017: The Tribes of the State of Israel: Together and Apart – Liberalism and Multiculturalism in Israel, Dvir Publishing. (Hebrew)
- 2019: The Story of Secular Jews, Kinneret Zmora-Bitan Dvir. (Hebrew)

Novels:

- The Blanket, Schocken Publishing, 2005. (Hebrew)
- Highway No. 5, Schocken Publishing, 2006. (Hebrew)
- The Sea Above Us, Schocken Publishing, 2007. (Hebrew)
- Separate Entrance (Short Stories), Zmora-Bitan, 2009. (Hebrew)
- Forbidden Loves, Zmora-Bitan, 2010. (Hebrew)
- The Black Sun, Zmora-Bitan, 2013. (Hebrew)

== See also ==
- List of Israel Prize recipients
