= Jewish and democratic state =

Israeli legal definition

"Jewish and democratic state" is the Israeli legal definition of the nature and character of the State of Israel. The "Jewish" nature was first defined within the Israeli Declaration of Independence in May 1948 (see Jewish state and Jewish homeland). The "democratic" character was first officially added in the amendment to Israel's Basic Law: The Knesset, which was passed in 1985 (amendment 9, clause 7A).

Numerous scholars and political observers have debated the definition, particularly whether the terms are contradictory or complementary. Central to these debates are the rights of Palestinians, including Palestinian citizens of Israel and Palestinians living under Israeli occupation in Gaza and the West Bank. Critics have said that Israel is not a democracy, but an apartheid regime.

== Background ==
=== Jewish state ===
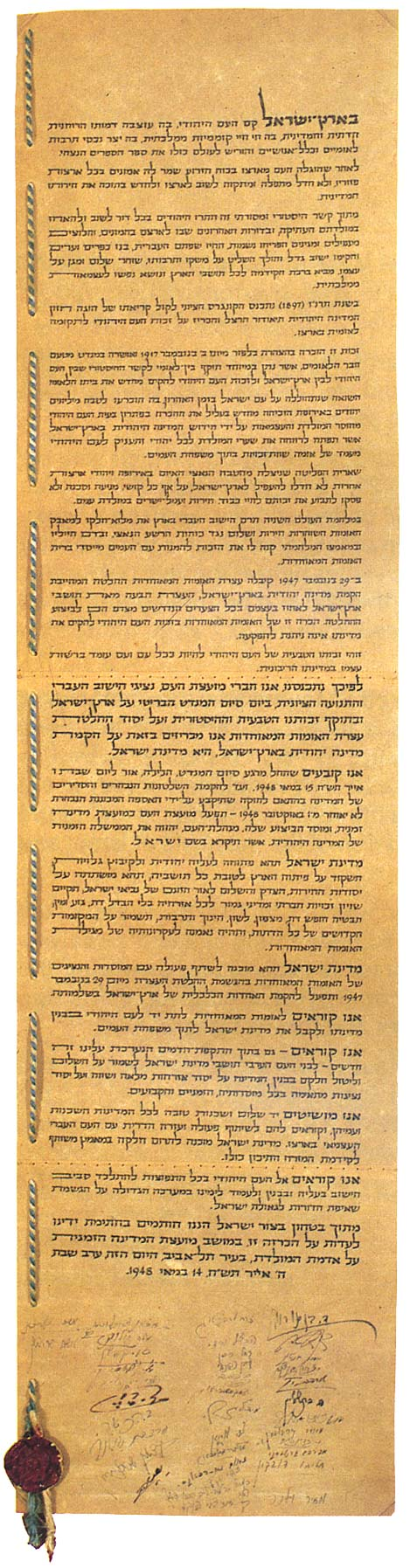
Israeli Declaration of Independence

The Israeli Declaration of Independence identifies Israel as a "Jewish state" in the sense that, as an ethnicity, Jews can exercise their right to self-determination in their homeland. In the 2018 Nation-state law, the right to self-determination was defined as unique to the Jewish people in Israel. The law outlines a number of roles and responsibilities by which Israel is bound in order to fulfill the purpose of serving as the Jews' nation-state. However, it was met with sharp backlash internationally and has been characterized as racist and undemocratic by some critics. After it was passed, several groups in the Jewish diaspora expressed concern that it was actively violating Israel's self-defined legal status as a "Jewish and democratic state" in exchange for adopting an exclusively Jewish identity. The European Union stated that the Nation-State Bill had complicated the Israeli–Palestinian peace process, while the Arab League, the Palestine Liberation Organization, the Organization of Islamic Cooperation, and the Muslim World League condemned it as a manifestation of apartheid.

=== Democratic state ===
The word "Democratic" is absent throughout the Israeli Declaration of Independence. However, the declaration states the intention to:

Ensure complete equality of social and political rights to all its inhabitants irrespective of religion, race or sex: It will guarantee freedom of religion, conscience, language, education, and culture; it will safeguard the Holy Places of all religions; and it will be faithful to the principles of the Charter of the United Nations.

and appeals to:

the Arab inhabitants of the State of Israel to preserve peace and participate in the upbuilding of the State on the basis of full and equal citizenship and due representation in all its provisional and permanent institutions.

=== Basic Law of 1985 ===
Since no constitution had been passed by 1985, the Supreme Court ruled that the Declaration of Independence document is a guiding principle of Israeli society and its state, the need to legally define the Jewish nature and Democratic character of the State of Israel arose. During the 1984 Knesset elections, religious ideas were brought up that were aimed at canceling the democratic character of Israel, and replacing it with a theocratic Halachic state, and thus in the eleventh Knesset session, the amendment to the Basic Law: the Knesset was passed (to become effective as of the Twelfth Knesset), that stipulated that:

7A. A candidates list shall not participate in elections to the Knesset, if the goals or actions of the list, expressly or by implication, include one of the following:

(1) negation of the existence of the State of Israel as a Jewish and democratic state;

(2) incitement to racism;

(3) support for armed struggle by a hostile state or a terrorist organization against the State of Israel.

— Basic Law: The Knesset (1985)

=== Later usage ===
Since then the definition of "a Jewish and democratic state" was used in additional Basic Laws of Israel: Basic Law: Human Dignity and Liberty and Basic Law: Freedom of Occupation, that were legislated in 1992, and amended in 1994. These laws specifically states that:

1. The purpose of this Basic Law is to protect human dignity and liberty, in order to establish in a Basic Law the values of the State of Israel as a Jewish and democratic state.

— Basic Law: Human Dignity and Liberty

2. The purpose of this Basic Law if to protect freedom of occupation, in order to establish in a Basic Law the values of the State of Israel as a Jewish and democratic state.

— Basic Law: Freedom of Occupation (1994)

== Public debate ==
In 1996, the National Democratic Assembly, a Palestinian party in Israel, raised the idea of Israel as a "state for all its citizens," stoking debates around Israel's characterization of itself as a Jewish and democratic state.

As part of a project to draft a constitution for Israel by the Israel Democracy Institute (IDI) led by former Chief Justice Aharon Barak, the country's Jewish and democratic character was described as follows:

The State of Israel is a Jewish state in the following two senses: it is the political framework in which the right of the Jewish people to self-determination is manifested and it is a "Jewish nation-state." A first and necessary condition to being a Jewish and democratic state is a decisive majority of Jews in the State. Israel's attribute as a Jewish and democratic state is conveyed through aspects of Zionism and Jewish heritage; first and foremost, each and every Jew has the right to immigrate to the State of Israel. Other aspects are Hebrew being the main official language of the State and the inextricable link to Jewish culture in public life. On the other hand, the characterization of the State as Jewish is not intended to bestow extra privileges on its Jewish citizens and does not obligate the imposition of religious requirements by state law.

The State of Israel is democratic in the following sense: the sovereign is the entire community of the nation's citizens (and it alone), irrespective of ethnic-national origin. In the main, the character of the State as a democratic country is manifested by two basic principles: the first being the recognition of the dignity of man qua man, and the second, derived from the first, is the recognition of the values of equality and tolerance. Arrangements regarding free and equal elections, the recognition of the core human rights, including dignity and equality, separation of powers, the rule of law, and an independent judiciary, are all drawn from these principles. Democracy's basic principles require equal treatment of all those included as citizens of the State, without regard to their ethnic, religious, cultural, and linguistic affiliations.

The IDI concludes that "the definition of Israel as a 'Jewish state' does not contradict its definition as a 'state of its citizens.' Although the State is Jewish in that, within its framework, the realization of certain interests of the Jewish people is ensured and its identity is protected and developed, nonetheless, its sovereignty lies in its community of citizens, including the non-Jewish community."

The boundaries of the definition of "a Jewish and democratic state" are subject to public discourse in Israel, in context of the relation between state and government. Already in 1994, the question whether Israeli Government (i.e. the Cabinet) is permitted to limit the import of Non-Kosher meat, despite the Basic Law: Freedom of Occupation arose. Initially, the Israeli High Court of Justice ruled that the government is not permitted to limit such import of non-Kosher meat. However, after the Knesset passed some amendments to the basic laws, the limit was included.

Another debate was on the issue of whether the state is permitted to limit the leasing of national land in certain areas of Israel exclusively to Jews.

The Diversity of Israeli Society has produced a few main approaches to the definition of "a Jewish and Democratic State", which the current commonly accepted approach is the combination of all of them: "A Torah State" (Halachic state), "National-Religious State", "National Culture State", "The State of the Jewish People", "The Jewish State", and "The Jewish State and the State of all its citizens".

According to a 2013 Israel Democracy Institute poll, three-quarters of Israeli Jews "believe that the State of Israel can be both Jewish and democratic", whereas two-thirds of Israeli Arabs do not believe that such a combination is possible.

In response to Knesset's passing of the Basic Law: Israel as the Nation-State of the Jewish People in 2018, Israeli author and journalist Yossi Klein Halevi said, "Israel is based on two non-negotiable identities. The homeland of all Jews, whether or not they are citizens of Israel, and it's the state of all its citizens, whether or not they are Jews."

Especially since 2021, various reports and publications have challenged Israel's status as a democracy and accused it of apartheid against Palestinians, including those living under Israeli occupation in Gaza and the West Bank and, to a lesser extent, Palestinian citizens of Israel.

== Commentary by the Israeli High Court of Justice ==
The Fifteenth Knesset again amended the "Basic Law: The Knesset", in order to enforce the limit not only upon a party of candidates list but also upon each individual, separately:

7A. A candidates list shall not participate in elections to the Knesset, and a person shall not be a candidate for election to the Knesset, if the goals or actions of the list or the actions of the person, expressly or by implication, include one of the following: (…) (1) negation of the existence of the State of Israel as a Jewish and democratic state; (…)

— Basic Law: The Knesset (1999)

During the Elections for the 16th Knesset, the Israeli Central Elections Committee disqualified the candidacy of Azmi Bishara and of Ahmad Tibi based upon this law. The petition to disqualify right-wing activist Baruch Marzel was rejected. As a result of this rejection, petitions were submitted to the High Court of Justice against all three rulings of the Central Elections Committee. Therefore, the clause within the Basic Law: The Knesset, was now a subject to a thorough judicial examination by the High Court of Justice, and eventually the High Court of Justice had turned around the former two ruling by Central Elections Committee, and approved the latter, hence, all three candidates were permitted to participate in the elections.

Regarding the meaning of the definition of "Jewish and democratic state" in this section of the law, then President of the Supreme Court of Israel, Aharon Barak, wrote that a narrow interpretation should be given to it, since it limits a basic right, in contrast to the broader interpretation that should be given to laws concerning Human rights.

Concerning the minimal interpretation of "a Jewish State", Justice Aharon Barak ruled that:

What, then are the 'core' characteristics shaping the minimum definition of the State of Israel as a Jewish State? These characteristics come from the aspects of both Zionism and heritage. At their center stands the right of every Jew to immigrate to the State of Israel, where the Jews will constitute a majority; Hebrew is the official and principal language of the State and most of its fests and symbols reflect the national revival of the Jewish People; The heritage of the Jewish People is a central component of its religious and cultural legacy.

— Aharon Barak 11280/02

According to Chief Justice Barak the minimal definition of "a Democratic State" is:

Recognition of the sovereignty of the people manifested in free and egalitarian elections; recognition of the nucleus of human rights, among them dignity and equality, the existence of separations of powers, the rule of law, and an independent judiciary system

— Aharon Barak 11280/02

Therefore:

A list of candidates or a candidate may not participate in the elections if the cancellation or denial of these characteristics is central and dominant among their ambitions and activities; and they act decisively to realize these ambitions; and provided all can be persuasively, clearly and unequivocally proved by the established evidence.

— Aharon Barak 11280/02

Chief Justice Barak pondered whether every candidates list objecting the existence of Israel as a Jewish and democratic state should be disqualified, or a "Probabilistic standard" should be adopted, wherein according to this standard, a candidates list may be disqualified only if there is a real chance that it will actually succeed in promoting its goals that are in contradictory to the nature of Israel as a Jewish and democratic state. Eventually, he left that question open for future judicial debate, stating that "it requires more review".

== See also ==
- Jewish state, a synonym for Israel in global politics
- Halakhic state, a Jewish state that factors Judaism and Jewish religious law into most or all aspects of governance
- Homeland for the Jewish people, an idea rooted in Jewish history, culture, and religion
- Basic Law: Israel as the Nation-State of the Jewish People, an Israeli Basic Law passed in 2018
- Der Judenstaat, an 1896 German-language book published by Theodor Herzl
- Ethnic democracy, a political system that purports to combine a structured ethnic dominance with democratic, political, and civil rights for all
- Religious democracy
- Herrenvolk democracy, political system in which a specific ethnic group has voting rights and the right to run for office, while other groups are disenfranchised
