= Homeland for the Jewish people =

Idea rooted in Jewish history, religion and culture

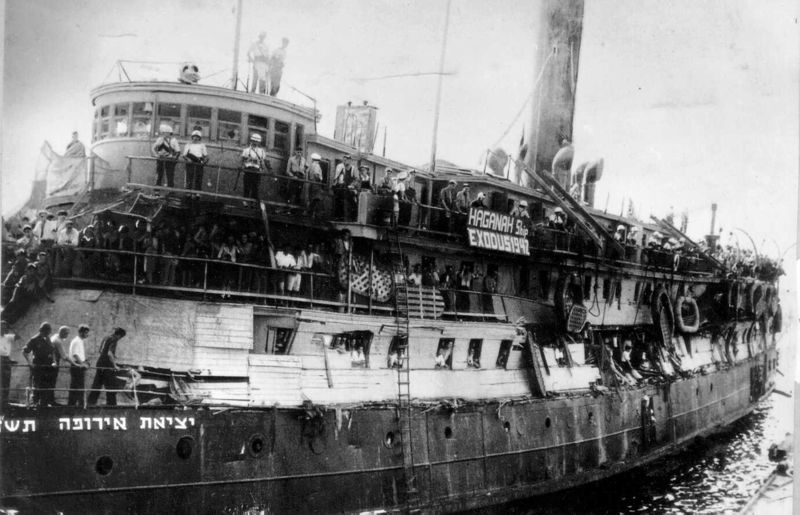
Jews, largely Holocaust survivors, on their way from France to Mandatory Palestine, aboard the SS Exodus

The Jewish aspiration to return to Zion, generally associated with divine redemption, has suffused Jewish religious thought since the destruction of the First Temple and the Babylonian exile.

== History (1881–1916) ==
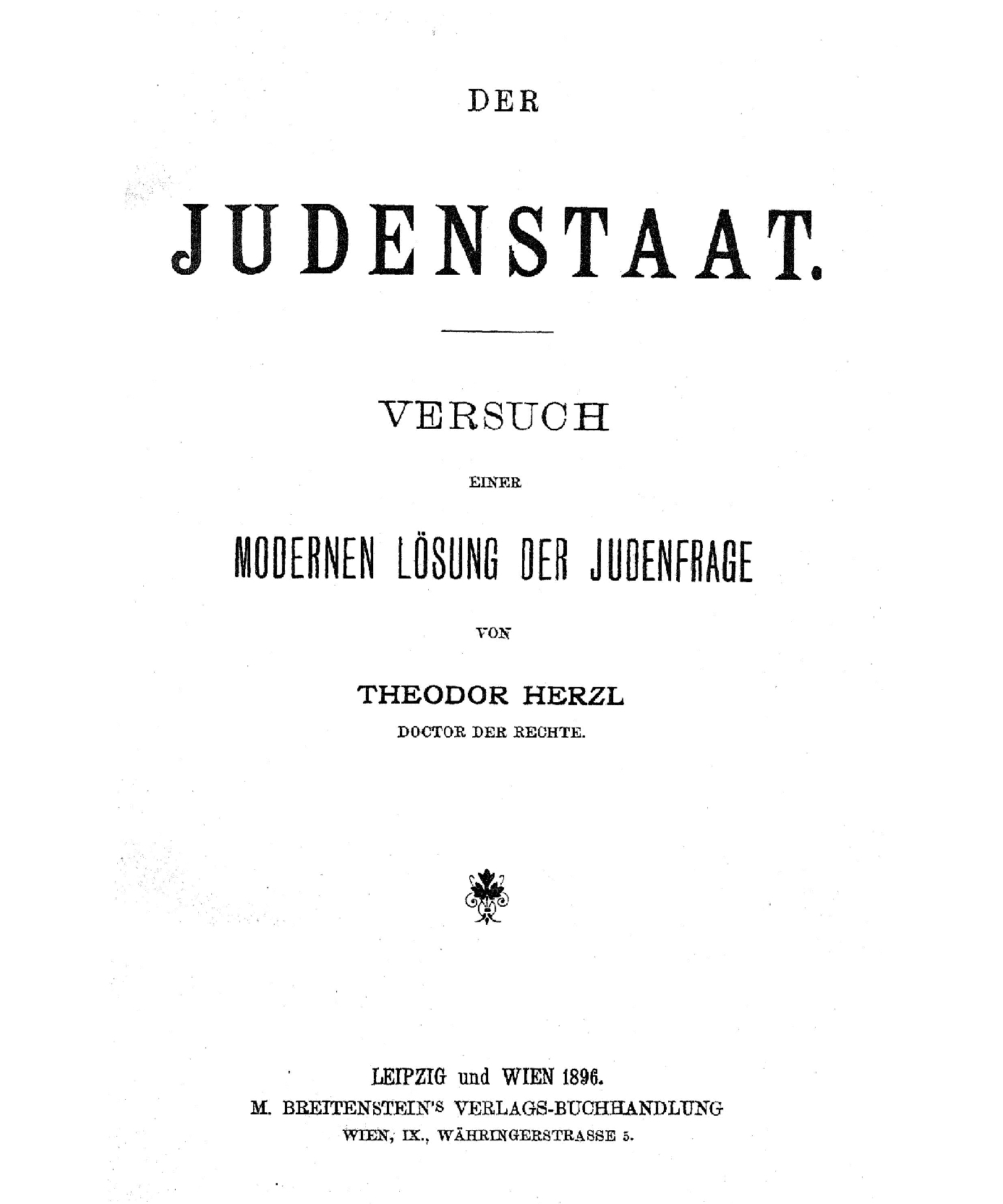
The book Der Judenstaat (The Jewish State, 1896) by Theodor Herzl

The first wave of modern Jewish migration to Ottoman-ruled Palestine, known as the First Aliyah, began in 1881, as Jews fled pogroms in Eastern Europe. Although the Zionist movement already existed in practice, Austro-Hungarian journalist Theodor Herzl is credited with founding political Zionism, a movement that sought to establish a Jewish state in Palestine, thus offering a solution to the so-called Jewish question of the European states, in conformity with the goals and achievements of other national projects of the time.

In 1896, Theodor Herzl set out his vision of a Jewish state and homeland for the Jewish people in his book Der Judenstaat (The Jewish State). The following year he presided over the First Zionist Congress in Basel, at which the Zionist Organization was founded.

The draft of the objective of the modern Zionist movement submitted to the First Zionist Congress of the Zionist Organization in 1897 read: "Zionism seeks to establish a home for the Jewish people in Palestine secured by law." One delegate sought to replace "by law" with "by international law", which was opposed by others. A compromise formula was adopted, which came to be known as the Basel Program, and read:

Zionism seeks to establish a home in Palestine for the Jewish people, secured under public law.

The Second Aliyah (1904–1914) began after the Kishinev pogrom; some 40,000 Jews settled in Palestine, although nearly half of them left eventually. Both the first and second waves of migrants were mainly Orthodox Jews, although the Second Aliyah included socialist groups who established the kibbutz movement. Though the immigrants of the Second Aliyah largely sought to create communal agricultural settlements, the period saw the establishment of Tel Aviv as the first planned Jewish town in 1909. This period also saw the emergence of Jewish armed militias, the first being Bar-Giora, a guard founded in 1907. Two years later, the larger Hashomer organization was founded as its replacement.

The Sykes–Picot Agreement of 16 May 1916 set aside the region of Palestine for "international administration" under British control. The first official use of the phrase "national home for the Jewish people" was in the Balfour Declaration. The phrase "national home" was intentionally used instead of "state" because of opposition to the Zionist program within the British Cabinet. The initial draft of the declaration referred to the principle "that Palestine should be reconstituted as the National Home of the Jewish people."

== History (1917–1948) ==
External videos
- "Palestine Outburst Follows UN Vote", British Movietone News, December 8, 1947.

With the 1917 Balfour Declaration, the United Kingdom became the first world power to endorse the establishment in Palestine of a "national home for the Jewish people."

In 1919, Harry Sacher wrote "A Jewish Palestine the Jewish case for a British trusteeship. In 1919 the general secretary (and future President) of the Zionist Organization, Nahum Sokolow, published a History of Zionism (1600–1918). In this book, he explained:

"... It has been said, and is still being obstinately repeated by anti-Zionists again and again, that Zionism aims at the creation of an independent "Jewish State". But this is wholly fallacious. The "Jewish State" was never part of the Zionist programme. The "Jewish State" was the title of Herzl's first pamphlet, which had the supreme merit of forcing people to think. This pamphlet was followed by the first Zionist Congress, which accepted the Basle programme—the only programme in existence."

At the San Remo conference of 19–26 April 1920, the principal Allied and Associated Powers mandated the creation of a Jewish homeland. Britain officially committed itself to the objective set out in the Balfour Declaration by insisting on its forming the basis of the Mandate for Palestine, which was formally approved by the League of Nations in June 1922. The preamble of the Mandate declared:

Whereas the Principal Allied Powers have also agreed that the Mandatory should be responsible for putting into effect the declaration originally made on November 2nd, 1917, by the Government of His Britannic Majesty, and adopted by the said Powers, in favor of the establishment in Palestine of a national home for the Jewish people, it being clearly understood that nothing should be done which might prejudice the civil and religious rights of existing non-Jewish communities in Palestine, or the rights and political status enjoyed by Jews in any other country....

A statement on "British Policy in Palestine," issued on 3 June 1922 by the Colonial Office, placed a restrictive construction upon the Balfour Declaration. The statement excluded "the disappearance or subordination of the Arabic population, language or customs in Palestine" or "the imposition of Jewish nationality upon the inhabitants of Palestine as a whole", and made it clear that in the eyes of the mandatory Power, the Jewish National Home was to be founded in Palestine and not that Palestine as a whole was to be converted into a Jewish National Home. The Committee noted that the construction, which restricted considerably the scope of the National Home, was made prior to the confirmation of the Mandate by the Council of the League of Nations and was formally accepted at the time by the Executive of the Zionist Organization. The Partition Resolution of the UN General Assembly died at birth when rejected by the Arabs. The UNGA has only the power to recommend.

On 29 September 1923, the British government became responsible for the administration of Mandatory Palestine. Along with its longstanding control of the Persian Gulf Residency and the Aden Protectorate, and its recently acquired control of the Emirate of Transjordan and of Mandatory Iraq, the British now controlled all of the territories in the Middle East except the French Mandate for Syria and the Lebanon.

In 1942, the Biltmore Program was adopted as the platform of the Zionist Organization, with an explicit call "that Palestine be established as a Jewish Commonwealth." In 1946, the Anglo-American Committee of Inquiry, also known as the Grady-Morrison Committee, noted that the demand for a Jewish State went beyond the obligations of either the Balfour Declaration or the Mandate and had been expressly disowned by the Chairman of the Jewish Agency as recently as 1932.

The period of the British Mandate was characterized by a great deal of political and social unrest among the Jews, the Palestinian Arabs, and the British (for example, the 1936–1939 Arab revolt, the 1944–1948 Jewish insurgency, and the 1947–1948 civil war in Mandatory Palestine).

The United Nations Partition Plan for Palestine was passed on 29 November 1947. The plan was accepted by the Jewish Agency for Palestine but was rejected by the Arab Higher Committee and by most of the Arab population. The Arab League then adopted a series of resolutions endorsing a military solution to the conflict.

== Founding of the State of Israel ==
The State of Israel was finally established on 14 May 1948 with the Israeli Declaration of Independence.

The concept of a national homeland for the Jewish people in the British Mandate of Palestine was enshrined in Israeli national policy and reflected in many of Israel's public and national institutions. The concept was expressed in the Israeli Declaration of Independence on 14 May 1948 and given concrete expression in the Law of Return, passed by the Knesset on 5 July 1950, which declared: "Every Jew has the right to come to this country as an oleh."

=== Character of the State of Israel ===
According to a 11 January 2019 article in Haaretz, Justice Esther Hayut, the President of the High Court of Justice, announced that eleven justices would be debating the "legality" of the July 2018 Basic Law: Israel as the Nation-State of the Jewish People, also known as the Nation-state law, including its "historical stipulations". (Note: Israel's Minister of Justice, Ayelet Shaked, was the advocate and architect of the Basic Law: Israel as the Nation-State of the Jewish People which defines the State of Israel as the nation-state of the Jewish people.)

== See also ==
- Proposals for a Jewish state
- Jewish Autonomous Oblast
- Jewish and democratic state
- Jewish state
- Land of Israel/ Palestine
- History of Israel/ History of the Palestinian people/History of the Jews and Judaism in the Land of Israel
- Binational solution
- Jewish Agency for Israel
- 1947 UN Partition Plan
- Christian Zionism
