= Basic Law: The Government =

De facto constitutional law of Israel

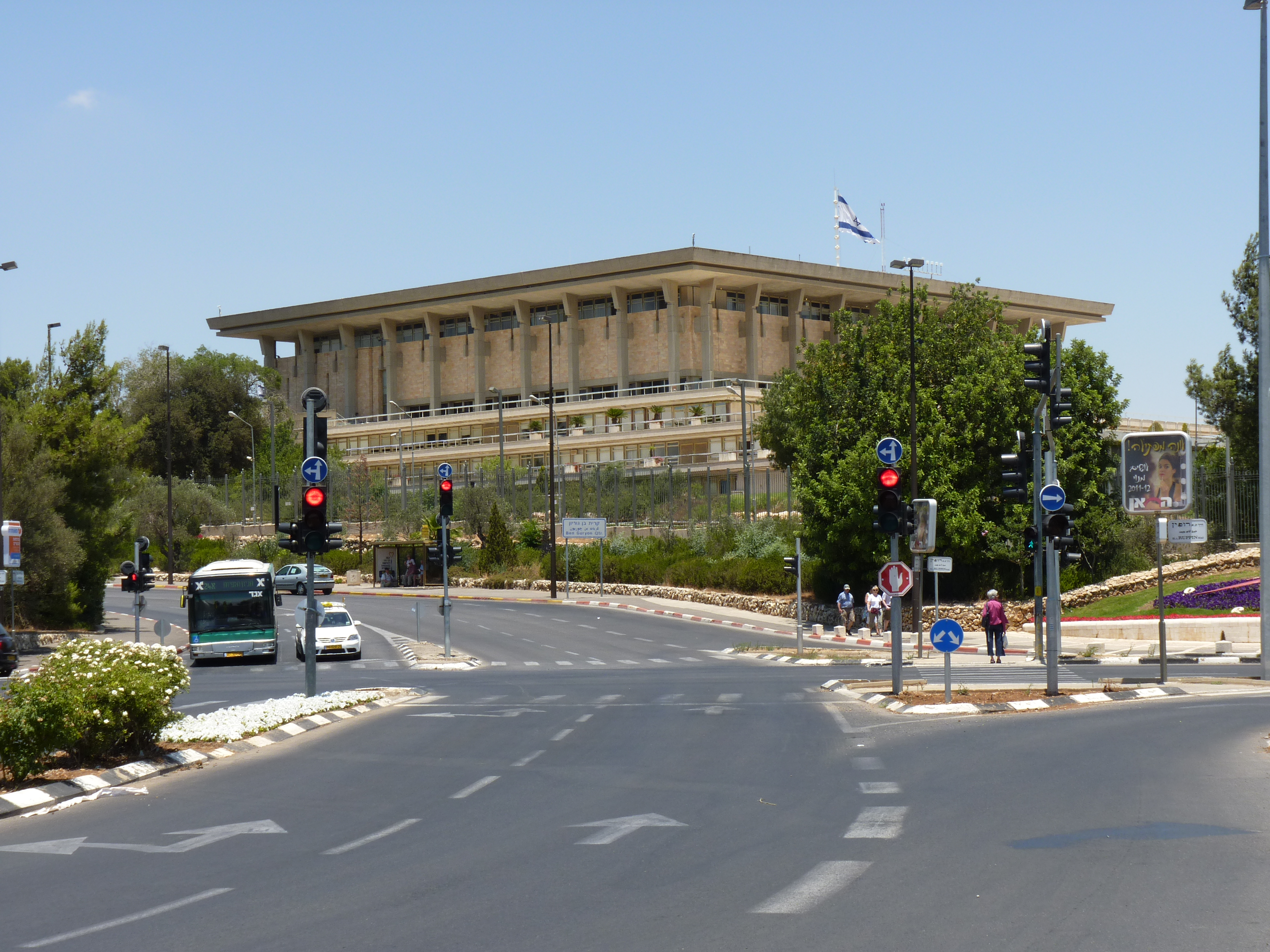

Knesset
- Citation: SĦ 5761 158
- Enacted: 18 March 2001

Legislative history
- Bill citation: פ-1287-14
- First reading: 21 December 1998
- Second reading: 7 March 2001
- Third reading: 7 March 2001

Repeals
- Replaced "Basic Law: The Government (SĦ 5752 214)"

Amended by
- SĦ 5774 346, SĦ 5774 554, SĦ 5775 188, SĦ 5775 249
- Status: Amended

Basic Law: The Government (Hebrew: חוֹק יְסוֹד: הַמֶּמְשָׁלָה) is a Basic Law of Israel, first legislated in the Sixth Knesset, on 13 August 1968 (י״ט באב התשכ״ח, Hebrew calendar). It was substituted by an additional Basic Law: The Government of 1992, in the Twelfth Knesset on 18 March 1992 (י״ג באדר ב׳ התשנ״ב), in order to change the electoral system, with the purpose of creating a direct prime ministerial elections system. After concluding the old parliamentary system of government was the best option for the complex composition of the Israeli society, it was once again substituted by an additional Basic Law: The Government of 2001, in the Fifteenth Knesset, on 7 March 2001 (י״ב באדר התשס״א), in order to cancel the previous additional law of 1992 that had replaced the original law of 1968, and with the purpose of restoring the old parliamentary system.

The basic law determines the composition of the Government, its roles and authorities.

== Main provisions (2001) ==
- 5–6: "The Government is composed of a Prime Minister and other ministers.... The Prime Minister shall be a member of the Knesset... A Minister need not be a member of the Knesset [he may be] ... A Minister must be an Israeli citizen and a resident of Israel."
- 7: "When a new Government has to be constituted, the President of the State shall, after consultation with representatives of party groups in the Knesset, assign the task of forming a Government to a Knesset Member who has notified him that he is prepared to accept the task; the President shall do so within seven days of the publication of the election results, or should the need arise to form a new government; and in the case of the death of the Prime Minister, within 14 days of his death."
- 28: "The Knesset may adopt an expression of no confidence in the Government... An expression of no confidence in the Government will be by a decision adopted by the majority of the Members of Knesset to request that the President assign the task of forming a Government to a certain Knesset member who gave his written consent thereto... If the Knesset has expressed no confidence in the Government, the Government shall be deemed to have resigned."
- 29: "the Prime Minister... may, with the approval of the President of the State, disperse the Knesset ... and the Government shall be deemed to have resigned."

== See also ==
- Basic Laws of Israel
- Cabinet of Israel
