= Basic Law: Torah Study =

Law passed by the Knesset in 2026

25th Knesset
- Long title: הצעת חוק-יסוד: לימוד תורה
- Territorial extent: Israel
- Enacted by: Knesset
- Enacted: 13 July 2026

Legislative history
- Introduced by: Moshe Gafni
- Preliminary reading: 10 June 2026
- First reading: 1 July 2026
- Second reading: 13 July 2026
- Third reading: 13 July 2026
- Voting summary: 63 voted for; 52 voted against

Related legislation
- Basic Laws of Israel

Summary
- Declares that "Torah study is a basic value in the heritage of the Jewish people and in the State of Israel"
- Status: Current legislation

Basic Law: Torah Study, informally known as the Torah Study Bill, is an Israeli Basic Law that defines Torah study as a "basic value" in Israel. It was first proposed by United Torah Judaism in July 2023 and was passed in July 2026.

== History ==
=== Early proposals ===
In July 2023, lawmakers from United Torah Judaism proposed a basic law aimed at giving Torah study "supreme value in the heritage of the Jewish people". This proposal however did not continue as it did not receive support from Likud at the time.

Then in November 2025, Avi Maoz of Noam proposed a similar bill on Torah study which outlined that "yeshiva students are performing 'meaningful service to the State and the Jewish people'".

=== Preliminary reading ===
On 10 June 2026, a bill enshrining Torah study sponsored by Moshe Gafni successfully passed preliminary reading in the Knesset with 56 votes in favor and 43 against. Following the vote, Haredi party leaders celebrated as a victory, with the chairman of Shas party, Aryeh Deri, championing this as a "historic step" in recognizing the value of Torah study, while United Torah Judaism leader Yitzhak Goldknopf called this moment the "beginning of righting an injustice".

By contrast, opposition leaders such as Gadi Eisenkot, leader of the Yashar party, suggested that this legislation was a "deal" that the government made in exchange for a few more weeks of power.

=== First reading ===
On 1 July 2026, the bill passed first reading with the support of 63 Knesset members while 53 members opposed.

=== Second and third reading ===
On 5 July 2026, the Knesset's House Committee began preparation for finalizing the bill for the second and third readings.

On 13 July 2026, the bill passed second and third readings in the Knesset after a lengthy debate, with 63 in favor and 52 against. Dan Illouz and Yuli Edelstein, two lawmakers from Likud and part of the governing coalition, joined the opposition in voting against the bill. Prime Minister Benjamin Netanyahu was notably absent during the voting process.

Israeli opposition parties have opposed the legislation, and have vowed to repeal it if they win power in the upcoming elections.

== Content ==
=== Text ===
Basic Law: Torah Study consists of only one section:

Torah study is a basic value in the heritage of the Jewish people and in the State of Israel.

=== Proposed second section ===
A proposed Section 2, which stated that "those who have undertaken to devote themselves to Torah study for an extended period shall be deemed, for purposes of their rights and obligations, as persons who are performing meaningful service for the State of Israel and the Jewish people", was not included in the final text of the law as enacted.

== Explanatory notes ==
The explanatory notes of the Basic Law are provided here for context, as translated from Hebrew into English. The original text is only available in Hebrew.

The proposed Basic Law published herewith proposes to enshrine in the Basic Law the value of Torah study as a fundamental value in the heritage of the Jewish people and in the State of Israel, in order to establish its recognition as a fundamental value and to create balances of justice in comparison with other fundamental values in the state.

The Basic Law Bill is also intended to provide a response to issues discussed in High Court of Justice 1877/14 Movement for the Quality of Government in Israel et al. v. Knesset et al. (published in Nevo, 12.9.2017), which repealed Chapter 31 of the Security Service Law [Combined Version], 1986, which concerned "Integration of Yeshiva Graduates and Haredi Educational Institutions", and was added to the law in 2014, and in High Court of Justice 6198/23 Movement for the Quality of Government in Israel et al. v. Minister of Defense et al. (published in Nevo, 25.6.2024), which dealt with the implications of the aforementioned ruling regarding the recruitment of yeshiva students and the transfer of financial support to educational institutions for students who did not receive an exemption or whose military service was not postponed.

When preparing the Basic Law Bill for the second and third readings, the Knesset Committee will examine whether the proposed legislation has any implications for the conduct of government authorities in light of it.

According to the assessment of the Budget Division of the Ministry of Finance, at this stage it is not possible to estimate the budgetary cost of the legislation, as it is not clear what actions are derived from the proposed text.
