= Shabtai Katash =

Israeli politician

- שבתי קטש
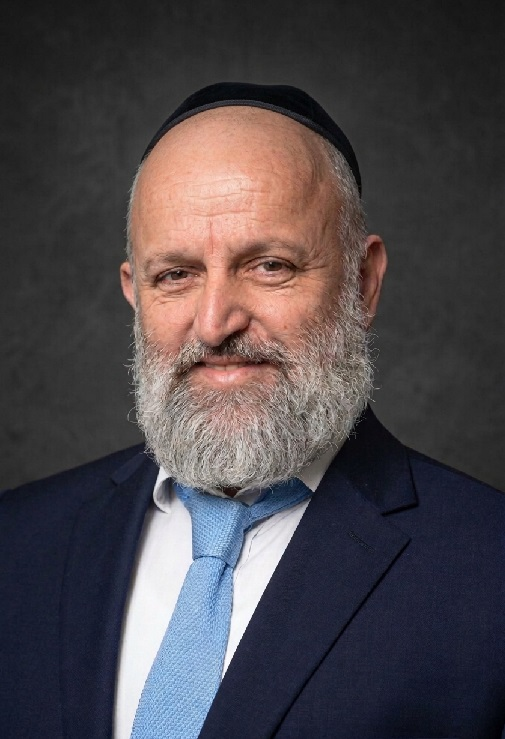
- Katash in 2026

Faction represented in the Knesset
- 2026: Likud

Other roles
- 2002–2007: Member of the Lod City Council
- 2024–2025: Member of the Lod City Council

Personal details
- Born: 2 June 1975 (age 51) Lod, Israel
- Party: Likud
- Spouse: Freidi Katash
- Children: 6
- Education: Ono Academic College
- Occupation: Lawyer • Businessman • Politician

Shabtai Katash (born 2 June 1975) is an Israeli lawyer, businessman, public activist and Chabad-affiliated political activist from Lod, who served as a Member of the Knesset for Likud in 2026.

== Biography ==
Katash is an adherent of the Chabad Hasidic dynasty, and is of Georgian descent. He operates a law firm and a real estate company, which has built projects in Lod and Tbilisi. He was first elected to Lod's City Council in 2002, (Note: Lod held a special early election for the City Council in 2002 following the death of the city's mayor) as the leader of the "Young Power" electoral list. He served until the dissolution of the Lod City Council in 2007.

Ahead of the 2022 Knesset election, Katash sought election to the Knesset as a member of Likud. Competing in the party's primaries for the 45th slot on the party's electoral list, which is reserved for members of the Ultraorthodox minority, Katash won the nomination, defeating Bnei Brak city councilor Yaakov Vider.

Ahead of the 2024 municipal election, Katash ran for a seat on Likud's electoral list in the city of Lod. He received the second slot, behind mayor Yair Revivo, and was elected to Lod's City Council. He resigned on 28 February 2025 after being elected head of the Lod Religious Council, which had previously been under an Appointed Commission for 14 years.

Katash entered the Knesset after Dan Illouz's resignation took effect on 13 August 2026. In the 2026 Likud primary he was chosen 2nd in the Jerusalem/Judea-Samaria/Shephelah regional slot and was placed in the 51st slot overall in the Likud 2026 Knesset electoral list, and failed re-election as the Likud won only 27 seats.
