= Dan Illouz =

Israeli politician

- דן אילוז
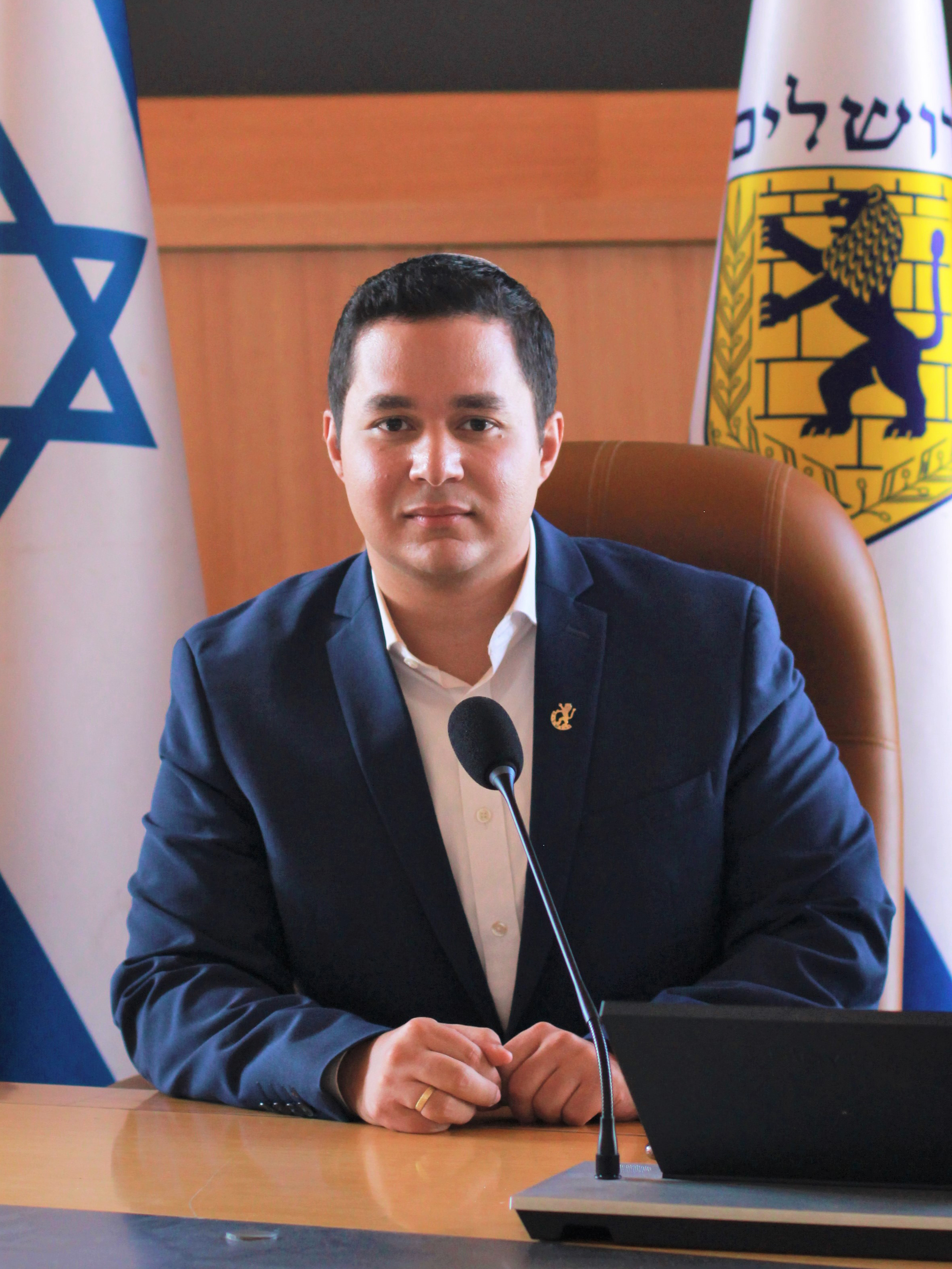
- Illouz in 2022

Faction represented in the Knesset
- 2023–2026: Likud

Other roles
- 2018–2021: Member of the Jerusalem City Council

Personal details
- Born: Dan Eliyahu Ya'akov Illouz; 23 February 1986 (age 40) Montreal, Canada
- Citizenship: Israel
- Party: Yisrael Beiteinu (since 2026)
- Other political affiliations: Hitorerut (2018–2021); Likud (2021–2026)
- Spouse: Bat-El Malka (m. 2019)
- Children: 2
- Education: McGill University; Hebrew University of Jerusalem
- Occupation: Lawyer • Politician

Dan Illouz (Hebrew: דן אילוז; born 21 February 1986) is a Canadian-born Israeli politician who served as a member of the Knesset for the Likud party from January 2023 until August 2026. Previously, he was a member of the Jerusalem City Council from 2018 to 2021. In July 2026, he announced that he would be leaving the party; the following month, he stated that he would run with Yisrael Beiteinu in the 2026 Israeli legislative election.

== Early life and education ==
Illouz was born to Moroccan-Jewish parents in Montreal, Canada. He has a degree in law from McGill University, and a degree in public policy from the Hebrew University of Jerusalem. He moved to Israel from Montreal in 2009, at the age of 23.

== Political career ==
Illouz joined Hitorerut, a political party in Jerusalem, and became a member of the Jerusalem City Council in March 2018 following the resignation of another councillor. He was subsequently elected to the council in the October 2018 municipal elections, and resigned from the council in 2021 as part of a rotation agreement with Yosef Spiezer. After resigning, Illouz served as the Israeli representative at the Zionist Organization of America, as well as a communities manager for the Kohelet Policy Forum. Ilouz is also a former parliamentary aide to Yariv Levin.

In 2022 Illouz decided to seek election to the Knesset as a member of the Likud, participating in primaries held by the party ahead of an upcoming legislative election. Illouz ran for the reserved immigrant spot on the Likud list against then-incumbent MK (and immigrant from Ethiopia) Gadi Yevarkan. Despite the fact that Yevarkan resigned from the Knesset to make himself eligible for the spot (which is reserved for newly incoming members of the Knesset), Illouz narrowly prevailed. The Likud received only 32 seats in the election, so Illouz did not enter the Knesset immediately, as he was placed 33rd on the party slate. However, after the swearing-in of the thirty-seventh government of Israel, several Likud ministers resigned their seats under Israel's Norwegian law, and Illouz entered the Knesset on 6 January 2023.

In October 2024, Illouz broke ranks with the Likud over proposed legislation to provide government subsidies to Haredi yeshiva students who do not perform military service. The Likud punished Illouz by removing him from the Knesset's Economic Affairs Committee and Foreign Affairs and Defense Committee, and by preventing him from submitting private bills in the Knesset. The legislation was withdrawn after enough MKs from the coalition, including Illouz, opposed it to the point that the coalition's majority was in doubt.

In July 2026, Ilouz joined the opposition in voting against Basic Law: Torah Study. He also announced that he would be departing from the party and will not participate in the party primaries. Illouz announced in August that he would run with Yisrael Beiteinu in the 2026 Israeli legislative election.

Illouz submitted his Knesset resignation on 11 August and was replaced by Shabtai Katash on 13 August.

He was placed tenth on Yisrael Beiteinu's electoral list.

== Personal life ==
Illouz married Bat-El Malka, then Or Akiva's municipal architect, in 2019. They have two children and live in Jerusalem. In addition to Israeli citizenship, Illouz was previously a Canadian citizen.
