= Hassan Jabareen =

Israeli lawer

Hassan Jabareen (born 1964) is a lawyer operating in Israel. He is particularly known for taking on cases of injustice against members of the Arab minority and is General Director of Adalah, which he founded in November 1996.

== Early life and education ==
Hassan Jabareen was born in Umm al-Fahm on 9 April 1964. He is the eldest of seven siblings born to his mother Afaf and father, Rafiq, who is also a lawyer.

His university education has included studying philosophy at Tel Aviv University, International Human Rights at American University Washington College of Law, and a doctorate in law from Hebrew University. Academic positions he has held include that of Yale World Fellow, a Senior Robina Law Fellow at Yale Law School, and a research fellow at the Wissenschaftskolleg in Berlin.

== Work ==
In his professional career Hassan Jabareen has specialised in Arab minority rights. He founded Adalah, The Legal Center for Arab Minority Rights in Israel, whose goals are "achieving individual and collective rights of the Arab-Palestinian minority in Israel" and protecting "the human rights of Palestinians living under occupation, based on international humanitarian law and international human rights law", in November 1996, and is an author for The Nakba Files, a joint project of Adalah and Columbia University.
