= Basic Law: Freedom of Occupation =

De facto constitutional law of Israel

12th Knesset
- Long title: חוק יסוד: חופש העיסוק
- Territorial extent: Israel
- Enacted by: Knesset
- Enacted: 9 March 1994

Related legislation
- Basic Laws of Israel

Summary
- Guarantees every Israel national or resident's "right to engage in any occupation, profession or trade"
- Status: Current legislation

Basic Law: Freedom of Occupation (Hebrew: חוֹק יְסוֹד: חוֹפֶשׁ הָעִיסּוּק) is a Basic Law in the State of Israel, enacted to protect the country's main human rights. The view of most Supreme Court judges is that the enactment of this law and of Basic Law: Human Dignity and Liberty began the Constitutional Revolution. According to this position, these laws marked a substantial change in the status of human rights in Israel.

This law was enacted by the 12th Knesset on 9 March 1994.

== Content of the Basic Law ==
=== 1 — Basic principles ===
Fundamental human rights in Israel are founded upon recognition of the value of the human being, the sanctity of human life, and the principle that all persons are free; these rights shall be upheld in the spirit of the principles set forth in the Declaration of the Establishment of the State of Israel.

=== 2 — Purpose ===
The purpose of this Basic Law is to protect freedom of occupation, in order to establish in a Basic Law the values of the State of Israel as a Jewish and democratic state.

=== 3 — Freedom of occupation ===
Every Israel national or resident has the right to engage in any occupation, profession or trade.

=== 4 — Violation of freedom of occupation ===
There shall be no violation of freedom of occupation except by a law befitting the values of the State of Israel, enacted for a proper purpose, and to an extent no greater than is required, or by regulation enacted by virtue of express authorisation in such law.

=== 5 — Application ===
All governmental authorities are bound to respect the freedom of occupation of all Israel nationals and residents.

=== 6 — Stability ===
This Basic Law shall not be varied, suspended or made subject to conditions by emergency regulations.

=== 7 — Entrenchment ===
This Basic Law shall not be varied except by a Basic Law passed by a majority of the members of the Knesset.

=== 8 — Effect of nonconforming law ===
A provision of a law that violates freedom of occupation shall be of effect, even though not in accordance with section 4, if it has been included in a law passed by a majority of the members of the Knesset, which expressly states that it shall be of effect, notwithstanding the provisions of this Basic Law; such law shall expire four years from its commencement unless a shorter duration has been stated therein.

=== 9 — Repeal ===
Basic Law: Freedom of Occupation** is hereby repealed.

** This Basic Law: Freedom of Occupation repeals and replaces the former Basic Law on freedom of occupation, enacted in 1992 (Sefer Ha-Chukkim of 5752, p. 114.)

=== 10 — Provisional ===
The provisions of any enactment which, immediately prior to this Basic Law would have been of effect but for this Basic Law or the Basic Law repealed in section 9, shall remain in effect two years from the commencement of this Basic Law, unless repealed earlier; however, such provisions shall be construed in the spirit of the provisions of this Basic Law.

== Guarantee of high legal status ==
Due to these rights' great importance, the Knesset chose to give this law a high legal status, protected by several means.

Section 4 of this law asserts that "There shall be no violation of rights under this Basic Law except by a law befitting the values of the State of Israel, enacted for a proper purpose, and to an extent no greater than is required, or by regulation enacted by virtue of express authorization in such law." This clause became known as "limiting paragraph", as it limits and restricts the Knesset in legislating laws contradicting this law. However, Section 8 states that "A provision of a law that violates freedom of occupation shall be of effect, even though not in accordance with section 4, if it has been included in a law passed by a majority of the members of the Knesset, which expressly states that it shall be of effect, notwithstanding the provisions of this Basic Law; such law shall expire four years from its commencement unless a shorter duration has been stated therein." Thus, unlike the Basic Law: Human Dignity and Liberty, the Supreme Court can only disqualify laws that contradict this Basic Law if they do not fulfill the requirements of Section 8.

Section 6 defends the law from Emergency Regulations, stating that the government cannot change this Basic Law, and thus cannot weaken the rights it protects, by the emergency regulations it can enact. As written: "This Basic Law cannot be varied, suspended or made subject to conditions by emergency regulations."
