= Basic Laws of Israel =

Fourteen quasi-constitutional laws

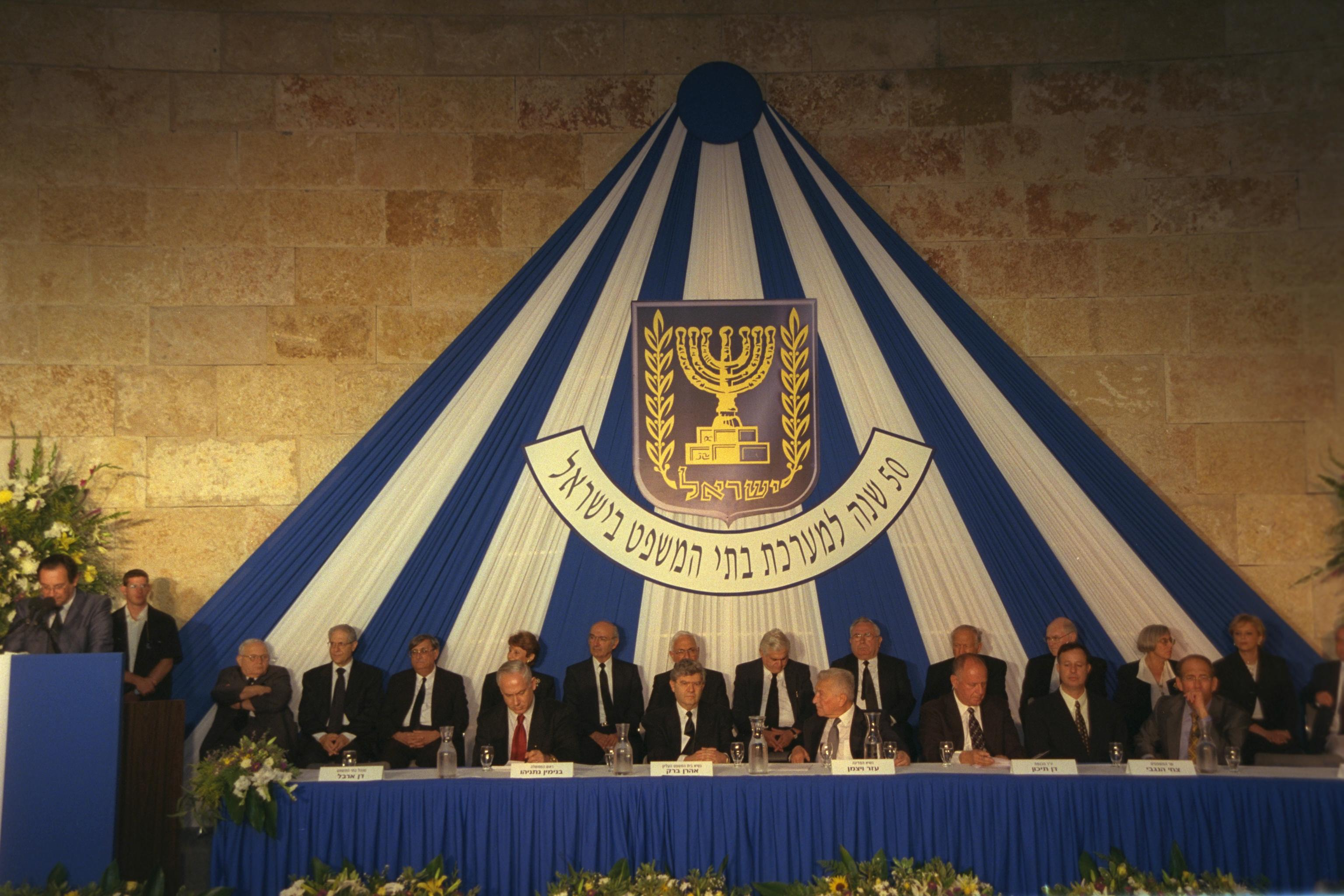
The Supreme Court of Israel, during its 50th anniversary celebration

The Basic Laws of Israel (Hebrew: חוקי היסוד, romanized: Ḥukey HaYesod) are fourteen quasi-constitutional laws of the State of Israel. While some of them can only be changed by a majority or supermajority vote in the Knesset, with varying requirements for different Basic Laws and sections, many can be altered through a majority vote, and new Basic Laws can be enacted by a majority vote likewise. The most recent Basic Law is Basic Law: Torah Study, enacted on 13 July 2026.

The Basic Laws were intended to be draft chapters of a future Israeli constitution, which, although promised in 1948, has been postponed since 1950; they act as a de facto constitution until their future incorporation into a formal, unitary, written constitution. Israel is one of six countries (along with New Zealand, San Marino, Saudi Arabia, Canada, and the United Kingdom) that operate entirely or in part according to an uncodified constitution consisting of both material constitutional law (based upon cases and precedents), common law, and the provisions of these formal statutes.

The Basic Laws deal with the formation and role of the principal institutions of the state, including the legislature, control of state lands, ceremonial and actual executive, economic policy, military, status of Jerusalem, judiciary, state comptroller rights and freedoms, policy on referendums, status of a nation-state, and Torah study, and with their relations between the state's authorities. The Basic Laws on Human Dignity and Liberty and on Freedom of Occupation protect civil rights in Israel, although some of these rights were earlier protected at common law by the Supreme Court of Israel. The Basic Law: Human Dignity and Liberty enjoys super-legal status, giving the Supreme Court the authority to disqualify any law contradicting it, as well as protection from Emergency Regulations.

A Basic Law enacted in 2018, "Israel as the Nation State of the Jewish People", stated in chapter 1C that "the realization of the right to national self-determination in the State of Israel is exclusive to the Jewish People." This law was criticized by some ethnic groups in Israel, including by some Israeli Druze. It was upheld in 2021 by the Supreme Court of Israel. In 2024, the Supreme Court of Israel struck down an amendment to Basic Law: The Judiciary for the first time, in addition to ruling that it had jurisdiction to conduct judicial review of Basic Laws enacted by the Knesset. However, the question of whether the Supreme Court may invalidate an entire Basic Law as opposed to amendments to it remains unanswered.

== Background ==
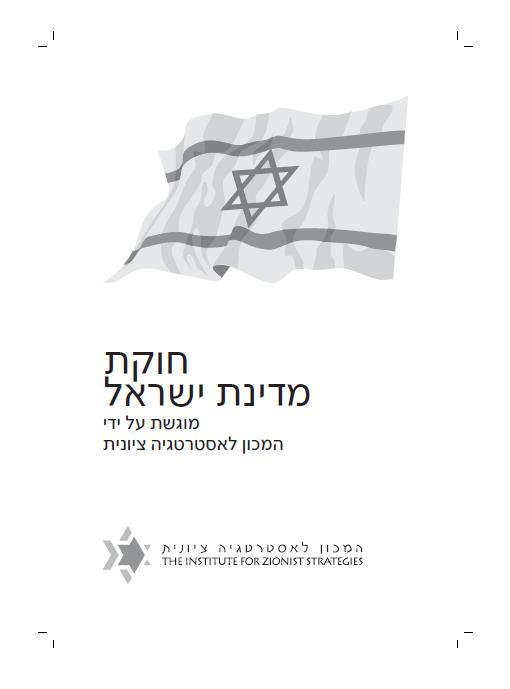
Cover page for Israeli Constitution draft proposed by the Institute for Zionist Strategies

The State of Israel has an uncodified constitution. Instead of a formal written constitution, and in accordance with the Harari Decision (הַחְלָטַת הֲרָרִי) of 13 June 1950 adopted by the Israeli Constituent Assembly (the First Knesset), the State of Israel has enacted several Basic Laws of Israel dealing with government arrangements and with human rights. The Israeli Supreme Court president Aharon Barak ruled that the Basic Laws should be considered the state's constitution, and that became the common approach throughout his tenure (1995–2006). Opponents of this approach included Barak's colleague, Supreme Court Justice Mishael Cheshin.

According to Israel's Declaration of Independence of 14 May 1948, a constituent assembly should have prepared a constitution by 1 October 1948. The delay and the eventual decision on 13 June 1950 to legislate a constitution chapter by chapter, resulted primarily from the inability of different groups in Israeli society to agree on the purpose of the state, on the state's identity, and on a long-term vision. Another factor was the opposition of David Ben-Gurion (Prime Minister 1948–1954 and 1955–1963), who thought that a formal written constitution would allow the Israeli Supreme Court to overrule his socialist policies. Furthermore, Ben Gurion aimed to shift towards a majoritarian election system, and adopting a constitution would have entrenched the existing proportional representation system.

Various bodies in Israel have called for the enactment of a formal constitution as a single document, and have submitted ideas and drafts for consideration. These calls increased during the 2023 anti-judicial reform protests, when multiple opposition figures and civil society organizations proposed the codification of the Basic Laws into a formal constitution.

The Israeli Declaration of Independence stated that a formal constitution would be formulated and adopted no later than 1 October 1948. The deadline set in the declaration of independence proved unrealistic in light of the war between the new state and its Arab neighbors. General elections eventually took place on 25 January 1949 in order to elect a Constituent Assembly which would approve the new state's constitution.

The Constituent Assembly convened in February 1949. It held several discussions about the constitution without reaching an agreement. After only four meetings, on 16 February 1949 it adopted the Transition Law, by which means it became the "First Knesset". Because the Constituent Assembly did not prepare a constitution for Israel, the Knesset is the heir of the Assembly for the purpose of fulfilling this function.

The Basic Laws do not cover all constitutional issues, and there is no deadline set for the completion of the process of merging them into one comprehensive constitution. There is no clear rule determining the precedence of Basic Laws over regular legislation, and in many cases, such issues are left to interpretation by the judicial system.

== The "Constitutional Revolution" and the development of judicial review ==
=== The Israeli constitution prior to 1992 ===
In 1950 the First Knesset came to what was called the Harari Decision. Rather than draft a full constitution immediately, they would postpone the work, charging the Knesset's Constitution, Law, and Justice Committee with drafting the document piecemeal. Each chapter would be called a Basic Law, and when all had been written they would be compiled into a complete constitution.

Between 1958 and 1988 the Knesset passed nine Basic Laws, all of which pertained to the institutions of state.

The power of judicial review is not addressed in Basic Law: The Judiciary, or elsewhere in Israel’s Basic Laws. Prior to 1992, the Supreme Court, sitting as the High Court of Justice, rejected multiple opportunities to claim the power of judicial review. Just after Israel’s founding, in the 1948 Ziv case the Court ruled against interpreting Israel’s Declaration of Independence as the nation’s constitutional document, and in 1970, the Court reaffirmed this principle in the Rogozinsky case. In Rogozinsky, the Court went so far as to explicitly deny itself the right to judicial review of ordinary Knesset legislation.

However, near the same time as the Rogozinsky case, the Court began to indicate a different posture with regard to judicial review of entrenched Basic Laws. At the time, the only provision in the Basic Laws that was entrenched was section 4 of Basic Law: The Knesset, which required “general, national, direct, equal, secret, and proportional elections” for the Knesset, and required an absolute majority of 61 MKs to amend. In its 1969 Bergman decision, the Supreme Court implicitly assumed the power of substantive judicial review, invalidating a public financing law that denied public funds to political parties not represented in the previous Knesset on the grounds that the law violated section 4. The Court grounded its power to strike down the law in the fact that the Knesset had failed to pass it with the absolute majority required, in the process upholding the principle of entrenchment in Israeli constitutional law. While this created only a procedural requirement that the Knesset had to meet to enact the law—namely reaching an absolute majority when passing a law in conflict with it—it also demonstrated the Court’s willingness to determine whether Knesset legislation met the substantive requirements of Basic Laws.

However, the Court explicitly refused to endorse the principle of judicial review of all Knesset legislation, explicitly stating that it did not intend for the Bergman decision to address that point. It further reinforced this stance in its 1974 Negev decision, clarifying that the Court lacked the power of judicial review in cases where the standard for potential review was an unentrenched ordinary law or Basic Law.

=== The Constitutional Revolution of 1992–1995 ===
In 1992 the Knesset passed the first two Basic Laws that related to human rights and to the basis of the Supreme Court's recently declared powers of judicial review. These are "Basic Law: Human Dignity and Liberty" and "Basic Law: Freedom of Occupation". Both Basic Laws contain clauses prohibiting the violation of the rights they enumerate, “except by a law befitting the values of the State of Israel, enacted for a proper purpose, and to an extent no greater than is required.” This limitations clause is contained in section 8 of Basic Law: Human Dignity and Freedom and section 4 of Basic Law: Freedom of Occupation.

These were passed by votes of 32–21 and 23–0 respectively, and Knesset debates indicate that many MKs were not aware that these laws pertained to the constitutional entrenchment of any rights nor that they affected the status of judicial review in Israel. However, Justice Aharon Barak, who would become President of the Supreme Court, explicitly declared that the passage of these Basic Laws had initiated a constitutional revolution in Israel. Barak argued that Basic Law: Freedom of Occupation, which was explicitly entrenched to require a 61 MK majority to amend under section 7, and Basic Law: Human Dignity and Freedom—which was not entrenched in the same way, but in Barak’s view required the Knesset to explicitly declare its intent to violate the law, in a similar manner to the Canadian Charter of Rights and Freedoms notwithstanding clause — created a set of generalities and conflicting principles in the Basic Laws, which meant that it fell to the judiciary to interpret and “[give] content to” those laws.

Barak’s declaration of a “constitutional revolution” presaged his majority opinion in the landmark 1995 Bank Mizrahi v. Migdal Cooperative Village case. Bank Mizrahi declared that due to the limitations clauses included in the 1992 Basic Laws, the Basic Laws now formed a written constitution that the courts had the power to uphold via judicial review. The more specific holding of Bank Mizrahi was that Knesset legislation that violates the limitations clauses of Basic Law: Freedom of Occupation and Basic Law: Human Dignity and Freedom is void no matter what majority passed the law, rejecting its position in Bergman and elaborated in Negev that only constitutionally entrenched Basic Laws empowered the court to exercise judicial review.

The Court’s main reasoning was that the Knesset holds two distinct roles within the Israeli state depending on the type of legislation it is enacting. In addition to its position as the legislative branch, which it occupies when dealing with ordinary legislation, the Knesset acts as a constituent assembly empowered to write a formal constitution for Israel when passing Basic Laws, deriving this authority from the First Knesset’s Harari Decision to pass on the task of writing the constitution to the Second Knesset.

This marked a significant departure from the British system of parliamentary sovereignty that Israel inherited and practiced prior to the Constitutional Revolution, as it permitted a Knesset to bind its successors. Outgoing Supreme Court President Meir Shamgar’s concurring opinion in Bank Mizrahi did not recognize the Knesset’s role as a constituent assembly and instead argued that the Knesset had an explicit power of self-limitation even when acting in its legislative capacity, but this interpretive approach has not been cited in subsequent cases.

The cumulative impact of the Bank Mizrahi decision was that it established judicial review of ordinary Knesset legislation, significantly curbing the Knesset’s parliamentary supremacy, and according to some Israeli constitutional scholars, fully converted the Israeli constitution from an unwritten constitution to a formal, written constitution, albeit an incomplete one.

=== Impacts of the Constitutional Revolution on the structure of the Israeli state ===
The limitations clauses function as both limitations on human rights, but also as an acknowledgement of substantive entrenchment, rather than the purely procedural entrenchment of section 4 of Basic Law: The Knesset recognized in the Bergman decision. Previously, the Knesset could repeal even Basic Laws simply through passing conflicting statutes, by virtue of parliamentary sovereignty. By contrast, Bank Mizrahi empowered the Knesset which passed the limitations clauses to bind future Knesset sessions to comply with those clauses or have their legislation struck down via judicial review. In this approach to entrenchment, the current Israeli system mirrors the entrenchment of the Canadian Bill of Rights, as both laws are weakly entrenched such that while Knesset and Canadian parliament legislation can be struck down by their respective courts for failing to comply with their respective entrenched laws, both parliaments can override this provision by either explicitly stating their intent to do so or amending the conflicting laws themselves, depending on the case. Shortly after the Bank Mizrahi decision, the Knesset declared that it would review proposed laws for compliance with other Basic Laws going forward, and coalition government agreements since this case have included the stipulation that no party would attempt to modify Basic Laws without the agreement of all coalition partners.

== Procedure for amendment ==
The Knesset can pass any law by a simple majority, even one that might arguably conflict with a Basic Law, unless the Basic Law has specific conditions for its modification. Basic laws that include specific conditions include the following:

- Article 4 of the Basic Law of the Knesset, on the electoral system, can be amended only by a majority of 61 of the 120 Knesset members.
- Article 44, which prevents the amendment of the law by an Emergency Regulation, can be amended only by a majority of 80 members.

A majority of the Knesset members can amend the Basic Laws on the government and on freedom of occupation.

== List of the Basic Laws of Israel ==
| Year passed | Basic Law | Description |
|---|---|---|
| 1958; updated in 1987 | The Knesset | States legislative functions of the parliament of the state. |
| 1960 | Israel Lands | Ensures state lands remain national property. |
| 1964 | The President of the State | Deals with status, election, qualifications, powers, and procedures of work of the President of the State. |
| 1968; updated in 2001 | The Government | (This law was replaced by the 1992 law, which established the direct election of the prime minister. In 2001, the 1968 law was restored with amendments.) |
| 1975 | The State Economy | Regulates payments made by, and to, the state. Authority to mint currency. |
| 1976 | The Military | Upholds constitutional and legal basis for the operation of the Israel Defense Forces. Subordinates military forces to the government, deals with enlistment, and states that no extra-legal armed force outside the Israel Defense Forces may be set up or maintained. |
| 1980 | Jerusalem Law | Establishes the status of Jerusalem as the capital of Israel; secures the integrity and unity of Jerusalem; deals with holy places; secures rights of members of all religions; grants special preference with regards to development. |
| 1984 | The Judiciary | Deals with authority, institutions, principle of independence, openness, appointment, qualifications, and powers of the judiciary. |
| 1988 | The State Comptroller | Deals with the powers, tasks, and duties of supervisor of government bodies, ministries, institutions, authorities, agencies, persons, and bodies operating on behalf of the state. |
| 1992 | Human Dignity and Liberty | Declares that basic human rights in Israel are based on the recognition of the value of man, the sanctity of his life, and the fact that he is free. Defines human freedom as right to leave and enter the country, privacy (including speech, writings, and notes), intimacy, and protection from unlawful searches of one's person or property. Any violation of this right shall be "by a law befitting the values of the State of Israel, enacted for a proper purpose, and to an extent no greater than is required". This law also includes instruction regarding its own permanence and protection from changes by means of emergency regulations. |
| 1994 | Freedom of Occupation | Guarantees every Israel national or resident's "right to engage in any occupation, profession, or trade". Any violation of this right shall be "by a law befitting the values of the State of Israel, enacted for a proper purpose, and to an extent no greater than is required". This law also includes instruction regarding its own permanence and protection from changes by means of emergency regulations. |
| 2014 | Referendum | Establishes that if the Israeli government adopts a decision or signs an agreement stipulating that the laws, jurisdiction, and administrative authority of the State of Israel will no longer apply to a certain geographical area, such agreement or decision must either be adopted via a treaty approved by 80 MKs, or by an absolute majority vote in a referendum. This means that Israeli sovereign territory (East Jerusalem, Golan Heights, and any land within the 1949 armistice lines), under Israeli law, can only be relinquished either through a treaty approved by over 80 MKs, in which case a referendum is not necessary, or, before a treaty is valid, it must be approved by an absolute majority vote in a referendum. |
| 2018 | Nation-State | Defines Israel as the nation-state of the Jewish people. The Nation-State Law also asserts that the right to national self-determination in the State of Israel is exclusive to the Jewish People, defines Hebrew as the official language of the state, and gives Arabic a special status in the state. It additionally defines the national symbols, holidays, and calendar of the state. |
| 2026 | Torah Study | Declares Torah Study as a "foundational value" of the Jewish people and the state of Israel. Passed amid protests against the conscription of Haredi men, who were historically exempt from Israel's draft laws. |

=== Repealed laws ===
| Year passed | Year repealed | Basic Law | Description |
|---|---|---|---|
| 1992 | 2001 | The Government | Repealed by article 46 of the 2001 law. |

== See also ==
- Israeli nationality law
- Land and Property laws in Israel
- Law of Israel
- Law of Return

== Sources ==
- Cohen, Asher; Bernard Susser (2000). Israel and the Politics of Jewish Identity: The Secular-Religious Impasse. Johns Hopkins University Press. ISBN 978-0801863455.
- Jacobsohn, Gary J. (1994). Apple of Gold: Constitutionalism in Israel and the United States. Princeton University Press. ISBN 978-0691029535.
- Mazie, Steven V (2006). Israel's Higher Law: Religion and Liberal Democracy in the Jewish State. Lexington Books. ISBN 978-0739114858.
- The Existing Basic Laws: Full Texts (English), the Knesset (Israeli Parliament) website, official translations - NOTE: The 1968 Basic Law: the Government translation is missing provisions, probably amendments added later on. As opposed to the 1968 and 2001 basic Law: the Government translations, the 1992 Basic Law: the Government uses the term "Acting PM" to refer to an "Interim Prime Minister" as well. The 2001 Law, which is in effect, present all provision in the translation, however, there are some lines missing. It is recommended to use the Hebrew laws official publications in the Knesset website.
- Jewish Law in the Debates of the Knesset (HaMishpat HaIvri b'Chakikat HaKneset) edited by Prof. Nahum Rakover. 2 vols., 1310 pp. 159–190.
