= Basic Law: Human Dignity and Liberty =

De facto constitutional law of Israel

12th Knesset
- Long title: חוק יסוד: כבוד האדם וחירותו
- Territorial extent: Israel
- Enacted by: Knesset
- Enacted: 17 March 1992

Related legislation
- Basic Laws of Israel

Summary
- Declares basic human rights in Israel
- Status: Amended

Basic Law: Human Dignity and Liberty (Hebrew: חוֹק יְסוֹד: כְּבוֹד הָאָדָם וְחֵרוּתוֹ) is a Basic Law in the State of Israel, enacted to protect the country's main human rights. It enjoys super-legal status, giving the Supreme Court the authority to disqualify any law contradicting it, as well as protection from Emergency Regulations. The Association for Civil Rights in Israel (ACRI) brought the petition that led to one of the earliest uses of this power: on October 14, 1999, the Supreme Court struck down a provision of the Military Adjudication Law for violating the Basic Law.

== History ==
Some Supreme Court judges see the enactment of this law and Basic Law: Freedom of Occupation as the impetus for the Israeli Constitutional Revolution. The law was enacted on March 17, 1992, in the final days of the 12th Knesset, Shortly after it was introduced into Israeli constitutional documents, it became prevalent in human rights discourse, as well as in freedom of speech cases. Prior to the enactment of the Basic Law, there was little statutory protection of human rights in Israel. These matters were resolved through the development of common law by Supreme Court cases. The Supreme Court in this period, between Israel's founding in 1948 until the Basic Law was enacted in 1992, could not invalidate statutes that disproportionately violated human rights. The judgements of the Supreme Court from this period, "establish[ed] the foundation that human rights are part of Israeli law".

== Content of the Basic Law ==
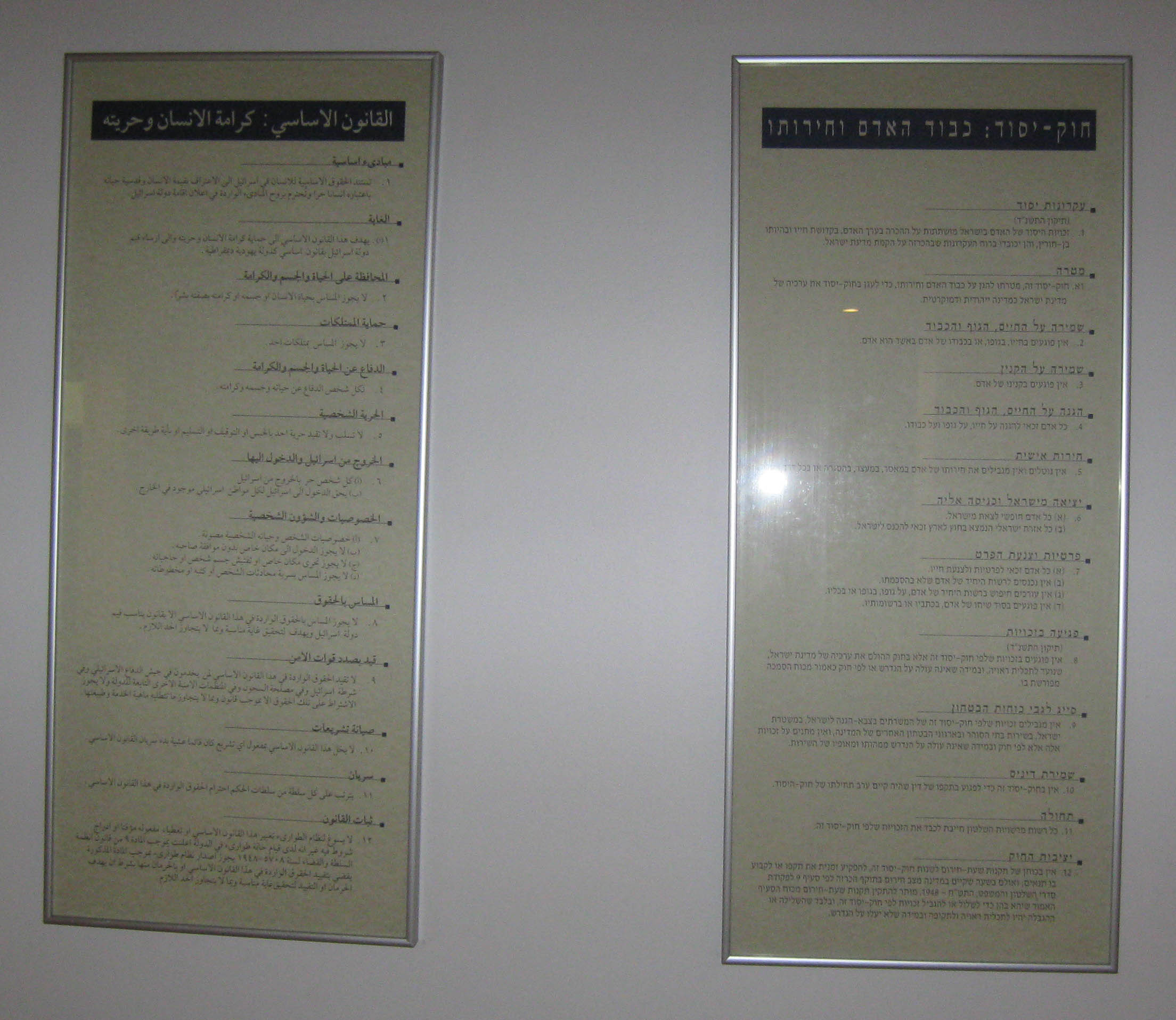
Text of law in Hebrew and Arabic

=== 1 — Purpose ===
The purpose of this Basic Law is to protect human dignity and liberty, in order to establish in a Basic Law the values of the State of Israel as a Jewish and democratic state.

=== 2 — Preservation of life, body, and dignity ===
There shall be no violation of the life, body, or dignity of any person as such.

=== 3 — Protection of property ===
There shall be no violation of the property of a person.

=== 4 — Protection of life, body and dignity ===
All persons are entitled to protection of their life, body, and dignity.

=== 5 — Personal liberty ===
There shall be no deprivation or restriction of the liberty of a person by imprisonment, arrest, extradition, or otherwise.

=== 6 — Leaving and entering Israel ===
(a) All persons are free to leave Israel.
(b) Every Israeli national has the right of entry into Israel from abroad.

=== 7 — Privacy ===
(a) All persons have the right to privacy and to intimacy.
(b) There shall be no entry into the private premises of a person who has not consented thereto.
(c) No search shall be conducted on the private premises of a person, nor in the body or personal effects.
(d) There shall be no violation of the confidentiality of conversation, or of the writings or records of a person.

=== 8 — Violation of rights ===
There shall be no violation of rights under this Basic Law, except by a law befitting the values of the State of Israel, enacted for a proper purpose, and to an extent no greater than is required.

=== 9 — Reservation regarding security forces ===
There shall be no restriction of rights under this Basic Law held by persons serving in the Israel Defence Forces, the Israel Police, the Prisons Service, and other security organizations of the State, nor shall such rights be subject to conditions, except by virtue of a law, or by regulation enacted by virtue of a law, and to an extent no greater than is required by the nature and character of the service.

=== 10 — Validity of laws ===
This Basic Law shall not affect the validity of any law (din) in force prior to the commencement of the Basic Law.

=== 11 — Application ===
All governmental authorities are bound to respect the rights under this Basic Law.

=== 12 — Stability ===
This Basic Law cannot be varied, suspended, or made subject to conditions by emergency regulations; notwithstanding, when a state of emergency exists, by virtue of a declaration under section 9 of the Law and Administration Ordinance, 5708–1948, emergency regulations may be enacted by virtue of said section to deny or restrict rights under this Basic Law, provided the denial or restriction shall be for a proper purpose and for a period and extent no greater than is required.

=== Amendment of section 1 ===
(1) Section 1 shall be designated 1(a) and shall be preceded by the following section:

==== Basic principles ====
1. Fundamental human rights in Israel are founded upon recognition of the value of the human being, the sanctity of human life, and the principle that all persons are free; these rights shall be upheld in the spirit of the principles set forth in the Declaration of the Establishment of the State of Israel.

(2) At the end of section 8, the following shall be added:

"or by regulation enacted by virtue of express authorization in such law."

However, several cardinal human rights are missing from this document, such as the Freedom of Religion, Right for Equality, Freedom of Protest, Freedom of Speech (the last two are recognized by the Supreme Court as "belonging to the freedoms that characterize Israel as a democratic state"), and others. These rights were given to the residents of Israel by general legal principles and Supreme Court rulings which existed before this Basic Law. Although these rights were not included in this law, some jurists, such as former Chief Justice of The Supreme Court of Israel Aharon Barak, see these rights are directly derived from the "right to dignity".

== Guarantee of super-legal status ==
Due to these rights' great importance, the Knesset chose to give this law a super-legal status, protected by several means.

Section 8 of this law asserts that "There shall be no violation of rights under this Basic Law except by a law befitting the values of the State of Israel, enacted for a proper purpose, and to an extent no greater than is required, or by regulation enacted by virtue of express authorization in such law." (sentence in italics added in a 1994 amendment to the law). This clause became known as "limiting paragraph", as it limits and restricts the Knesset in legislating laws contradicting this law.

Section 12 defends the law from the Emergency Regulations, stating that the government cannot change this Basic Law, and thus cannot weaken the rights it protects, by the emergency regulations it can enact. As written: "This Basic Law cannot be varied, suspended or made subject to conditions by emergency regulations;". However, when a State of Emergency is in place, regulations can be enacted that restrict these rights: "notwithstanding, when a state of emergency exists, by virtue of a declaration under section 9 of the Law and Administration Ordinance, 5708-1948, emergency regulations may be enacted by virtue of said section to deny or restrict rights under this Basic Law, provided the denial or restriction shall be for a proper purpose and for a period and extent no greater than is required." Thus, the protection from Emergency Regulations is up to the government and Supreme Court's judgement.

== Criticism ==
The United Nations Human Rights Committee claimed that the Basic Law: Human Dignity and Liberty "does not contain a general provision for equality and non-discrimination". It called on Israel to "amend its Basic Laws and other legislation to include the principle of non-discrimination and ensure that allegations of discrimination brought before its domestic courts are promptly addressed and implemented." The Israeli human rights organization Adalah has elaborated that while the Israeli Supreme Court has interpreted The Basic Law: Human Dignity and Liberty as comprising the principle of equality, this fundamental right is currently protected by judicial interpretation alone, leaving the Palestinian minority in Israel vulnerable to legal discrimination.
