= Makdisi =

Makdisi is a surname. Notable people with the surname include:

- George Makdisi (1920–2002), American professor of oriental studies
- Jean Said Makdisi (born 1940), Palestinian writer and scholar
- Saree Makdisi (born 1964), American literary critic and professor, son of the above
- Ussama Makdisi (born 1968), Palestinian American historian, son of Jean Said Makdisi above.
- Karim Makdisi, professor at Tufts, also son of Jean Said Makdisi.
- John Makdisi, American law professor

== See also ==
- Wadad Makdisi Cortas (1909–1979), Lebanese-Palestinian educator and memoirist
