= List of Edward Said memorial lectures =

Since Edward Said's death in 2003, several institutions have instituted annual lecture series in his memory, including Columbia University, University of Warwick, Princeton University, University of Adelaide, The American University in Cairo, Simon Fraser University, London Review of Books, the Barenboim-Said Akademie and Palestine Center, with such notables speaking as Daniel Barenboim, Noam Chomsky, Robert Fisk, Marina Warner and Cornel West.

== Columbia University ==
- 2005 Daniel Barenboim: Wagner, Israel and Palestine
- 2006 Frank Kermode: Living On the Hyphen: Yeats, Anglo-Irish Poet
- 2007 David Bromwich: Moral Imagination
- 2008 Adonis: A Reading and a Recital
- 2009 Noam Chomsky: The Unipolar Moment and the Culture of Imperialism
- 2011 Ahdaf Soueif: Notes from the Egyptian Revolution
- 2012 W. J. T. Mitchell: Seeing Madness: Insanity, Media, and Visual Culture
- 2013 Raja Shehadeh: Is There a Language of Peace? Palestine Today and the Categorization of Domination
- 2014 Richard Falk: The Palestinian Future After Gaza
- 2015 Declan Kiberd: The Future of the Past: Revival Ireland 1891-1922
- 2017 Catherine Hall: Imaginative Geographies of the Black/White Atlantic

== University of Warwick ==
- 2004 Tim Brennan: The Politics of Belief
- 2005 Tariq Ali: Palestine & The Western Liberal Conscience
- 2006 Ahdaf Soueif: The Heart of the Matter: Palestine in the World Today
- 2007 Gilbert Achcar: Orientalism in Reverse: Post 1979 Trends in French Orientalism
- 2008 Declan Kiberd: Edward Said and the Everyday
- 2010 Eyal Weizman: Spatial Politics in Israel and Palestine
- 2011 Mourid Barghouti
- 2012 Benita Parry: What’s Left in Postcolonial Studies?
- 2013 Samir Amin: The Implosion of the Contemporary System: A Challenge for the Societies of the South
- 2014 Joe Cleary
- 2015 Ilan Pappe
- 2016 Karima Bennoune
- 2017 Rafeef Ziadah

== Princeton University ==
- 2004 Mustafa Barghouti: Prospects for Peace: The Vital Role of Civil Society in Bringing Democracy, Justice, and Prosperity to Palestine and Israel
- 2005 Judith Butler: Forgotten Histories of Post-Zionism: Universalism, Judaism, and the Messianic
- 2006 Azmi Bishara: War, Occupation and Democracy: US Strategy in the Middle East
- 2007 Tanya Reinhart: The Spirit of Struggle
- 2008 Karen AbuZayd: Palestine Refugees: Exile, Isolation and Prospects
- 2009 Amira Hass: One Occupation, Two Governments:The Onslaught On Gaza And The Palestinian Internal Rift
- 2010 Noam Chomsky: "I Am Kinda": Reflections on the Culture of Imperialism
- 2012 Mahmood Mamdani: “Settler Colonialism: Then and Now”
- 2014 Richard Falk, Professor Emeritus of International Law at Princeton University, and United Nations Special Rapporteur, "On the situation of human rights in the Palestinian territories occupied since 1967”
- 2015 Tariq Ali, journalist, author and filmmaker
- 2016 Jaqueline Rose, Professor of Humanities at the Birkbeck Institute for the Humanities in London
- 2017 Rashid Khalidi, Edward Said Professor of Modern Arab Studies and chair of the Department of History at Columbia University
- 2019 Emily Jacir: "Where We Come From"
- 2023 Mohammed El-Kurd: "Perfect Victims and the Politics of Appeal"

== University of Adelaide ==
- 2005 Robert Fisk
- 2006 Tanya Reinhart: In memory of Edward Said
- 2007 Ghada Karmi: Israel’S Dilemma in Palestine: Origins and Solutions
- 2008 Sara Roy: The Impossible Union of Arab and Jew: Reflections on Dissent, Remembrance and Redemption
- 2009 Saree Makdisi: From Occupation to Reconciliation
- 2010 Tariq Ali
- 2011 Noam Chomsky
- 2012 Ilan Pappe
- 2013 Mustafa Barghouthi
- 2014 John Pilger
- 2016 John Dugard

== The American University in Cairo ==
- 2005 David Damrosch: Secular Criticism Meets the World: The Challenge of World Literature Today
- 2006 Barbara Harlow: Resistance literature revisited: From Basra to Guantànamo
- 2007 Cornel West: The Vocation of a Democratic Individual
- 2008 Terry Eagleton: Terror and Tragedy
- 2009 Rokus de Groot: Contrapuntal Intellectual: Edward Said and Music
- 2010 Judith Butler: "What Shall We Do Without Exile?" Edward Said and Mahmoud Darwish Addressing the Future
- 2011 John Carlos Rowe : "American Orientalism After Edward Said"
- 2012 Michael Wood: Literature, Cinema and the Taste of Knowledge
- 2013 Saree Makdisi: Occidentalism: Making England Western
- 2014 Marina Warner: Ways of Dwelling: Edward Said and the Travelling Text
- 2015 Lila Abu-Lughod: A Settler-Colonialism of Her Own: Imagining Palestine’s Alternatives
- 2016 Souleymane Bachir Diagne: Reflections on Philosophy in Africa
- 2017 Ussama Makdisi: Anti-Sectarianism in the Modern Arab World
- 2018 Robert Young: Said’s Late Style -- A Palestinian Aesthetic
- 2019 Wadie Edward Said: Edward Said: Teachings, Familial and Otherwise
- 2022 (March) Raja Shehadeh: The Peregrinations of Memory: The Case of Palestine
- 2022 (November) Noam Chomsky: Global Realignments and the Prospects for a Livable World

== Simon Fraser University ==
- 2025 Cornel West: Where Do We Go From Here? On the Future of Justice and Solidarity

== The Jerusalem Fund ==
- 2008 Avi Shlaim and Ali Abunimah: Palestinians and Israelis: Two states or one state?
- 2009 Richard Falk: Imagining Israel-Palestine Peace: Why International Law Matters
- 2010 Rashid Khalidi The Palestine Question and the U.S. Public Sphere
- 2012 Sara Roy: A Deliberate Cruelty: Rendering Gaza Unviable
- 2013 Najla Said: Looking for Palestine
- 2014 Judith Butler
- 2015 Cornel West: The Legacy of Edward Said
- 2016 Wadie Said: The Terrorism Label: an Examination of American Criminal Prosecutions
- 2017 David Palumbo-Liu: Literature, Empathy, and Rights
- 2020 Daphne Muse: The Intersections of Our Resistance and the Legacies We Leave Future Generations
- 2021 Susan Abulhawa: Visualizing Israel’s Global Arms Hustling
- 2022 Jennifer Zacharia: Silencing Palestinian Voices
- 2023 Wadie E. Said: A Life Between Scholarship and Resistance
- 2024 Moustafa Bayoumi: The Question of Palestine in America

== London Review of Books ==
- 2010 Marina Warner: Oriental Masquerade: Fiction and Fantasy in the Wake of the Arabian Nights
- 2011 Rashid Khalidi: Human dignity in Jerusalem
- 2012 Ahdaf Soueif: Mina's Banner: Edward Said and the Egyptian Revolution
- 2013 Noam Chomsky: Violence & Dignity: Reflections on the Middle East
- 2014 Raja Shehadeh: Is There a Language of Peace?
- 2015 Daniel Barenboim: The Role of Music in Life
- 2016 Naomi Klein: Let them Drown - The Violence of Othering in a Warming World
- 2017 Mahmood Mamdani: Justice Not Revenge – Examining the Concept of Revolutionary Justice
- 2018 Amira Hass: The Preventable: Israeli Fantasies and Techniques of Population Expulsion
- 2019 Wadie Said, Susan M. Akram, Hassan Jabareen & Philippe Sands: Is Justice Still Possible? Palestine, International Law, and Public Discourse
- 2022 Abdulrazak Gurnah
- 2023 Francesca Albanese: Israel's Settler Colonialism: Law, Humanity, Empire
- 2024 Raji Sourani: Is the Gaza War the End of International Humanitarian Law?

== Barenboim-Said Akademie ==
In 2018, Mena Mark Hanna, dean of the Barenboim-Said Akademie, launched the Edward W. Said Days, a three-day interdisciplinary festival reflecting upon the legacy of Said's thought. Each festival is thematic and features three keynote speakers, an artistic exhibition, films, and guest musical artists.

- 2018 "On Late Style": Teju Cole, Linda Hutcheon, Raja Shehadeh, and the Michelangelo String Quartet.
- 2019 "On Counterpoint": Michael Wood, Adania Shibli, Sa'ed Atshan, The Tallis Scholars, and Akinbode Akinbiyi.
- 2020 "Culture and Power" (postponed to 2021): Alex Ross, Elizabeth Wilson, Laleh Khalili, Elaine Mitchener, Gilbert Nouno, Michael Wendeberg, Jean Kalman, and Abdo Shanan.
