= Najla Said =

American author, actress, playwright, and activist (born 1974)

- نجلاء سعيد
- Born: 4 April 1974 (age 52); New York City, U.S.
- Education: Princeton University
- Occupations: Author; actress; playwright; activist
- Years active: 2011–present
- Works: Full list
- Parents: Edward Said (father); Mariam Said (mother)
- Relatives: Wadad Makdisi Cortas (grandmother); Rosemarie Said Zahlan (aunt); Jean Said Makdisi (aunt); Saree Makdisi (cousin)
- Writing career
- Language: English
- Period: Contemporary
- Genres: non-fiction, memoir
- Notable work: Looking for Palestine: Growing Up Confused in An Arab-American Family
- Website: najlasaid.com

Najla Said (Arabic: نجلاء سعيد; born 4 April 1974) is an American author, actress, playwright, and activist. Said's literary and academic work addresses racism, stereotyping, social and economic inequality, with a particular focus on the challenges that face immigrant and second-generation Americans.

== Life ==
Said grew up on the Upper West Side of Manhattan. Her father was the noted postcolonial scholar and public intellectual Edward Said and her mother is Lebanese writer and activist Mariam C. Said. She graduated from Trinity School in 1992 and Princeton University and trained in acting at The Shakespeare Lab of the Public Theatre.

In 2013, Said discussed Arab identity politics with Salon magazine and her approaching of the subject in her book Looking for Palestine.

== Acting career ==
In 2010, Said featured in a one-woman off-Broadway play, Palestine.

Said has appeared in films including My Love Affair with Marriage, as well as several US TV shows including NCIS: New Orleans and New Amsterdam.

== Works ==
- Looking for Palestine: Growing Up Confused in an Arab-American Family. Penguin Group US. August 1, 2013. ISBN 978-1-101-63215-4.
- "Najla Said: An Open Letter to Shakira: We Are Not All Israel". Guernica. June 24, 2011.
