= Ella Shohat =

American academic and author

Ella Habiba Shohat
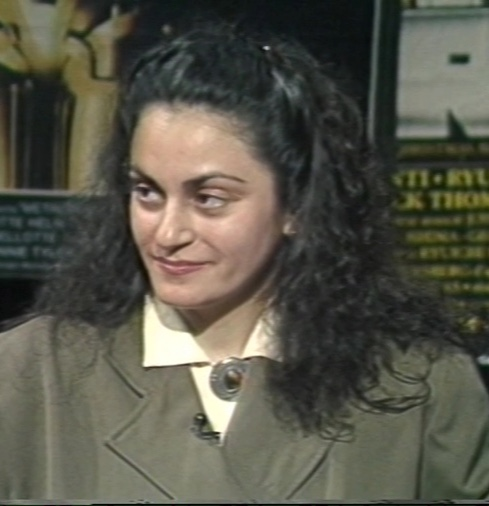
- Shohat on CUNY TV's Cinema Then, Cinema Now (1989)
- Born: 28 August 1959 (age 67)
- Occupations: Professor; Writer; Cultural theorist
- Awards: Middle East Monitor Palestine Book Award (2017) for Memoir

Academic work
- Discipline: Cultural studies
- Institutions: New York University
- Main interests: Eurocentrism; Orientalism; Post-colonialism; Trans-nationalism; Diasporic cultures; Iraqi-Jewish culture
- Notable works: On the Arab Jew, Palestine and Other Displacements

Ella Habiba Shohat is an American professor of cultural studies at New York University. She has written and lectured on the topics of Eurocentrism, orientalism, post-colonialism, trans-nationalism, diasporic cultures, and Iraqi-Jewish culture.

== Background ==
=== Arab-Jewish identity ===
Shohat's parents were Iraqi Jews who were displaced to Israel in the 1950s and then moved to the United States. She has described herself as an "Arab-Jew" with regard to her identity (see Mizrahi Jews). Some of Shohat's writing deals with Arab-Jewish identity within the context of the Arab–Israeli conflict. She described her childhood in Israel in the 1960s as a time when children were "recruited for the making of a new identity that was to clash with our parents' Iraqiness, Arabness and Middle Easterness". Her grandparents never learned Hebrew and her parents lamented how "in Iraq [...] we were Jews. In Israel, we are Arabs". Her father and his friends were told to stop speaking Arabic in the workplace and Shohat herself recalls similar messages being communicated to children at school. She described herself and other schoolchildren as "unknowing targets of mental colonization [...] [who] were expected to delete [...] the past across the border [and] also the transplanted Baghdads, Cairos or Rabats of our homes and neighborhoods". Shohat felt that this process was part of "disciplining, corrective, normalizing machine" designed to make them "proud Israelis".

== Writings and reception ==
In a review for the academic journal Biography, Egyptian Jewish professor Joyce Zonana described Shohat's book On the Arab Jew, Palestine and Other Displacements as a "profound work" and a "visionary contribution to (multi)cultural studies" which provides "helpful new ways of thinking about identity, politics, and culture in the Middle East and beyond". Zonana compared Shohat to Edward Said and Frantz Fanon, who she named as the only other writers whose "cultural/political analyses are so explicitly and productively rooted in their lives" in the way Shohat's work also is. Zonana further argued that Shohat had "honoured" Said and Fanon with this collection of writings. The essays "Sephardim in Israel: Zionism from the Standpoint of Its Jewish Victims", which alludes to Said's 1979 essay "Zionism from the Standpoint of Its Victims", and "Dislocated Identities: Reflections of an Arab Jew" were described as "canonical" and "groundbreaking".

The journal Mashriq & Mahjar also praised On the Arab Jew, Palestine and Other Displacements. In the review, Professor Jennifer L. Kelly described the book as "required reading for scholars working at the intersection of critical refugee studies, comparative colonial studies, and feminist studies". Kelly noted that Shohat "constructs meaningful parallels between dislocated Arab-Jews and displaced Palestinians with the establishment of the Israeli state in 1948" in order to "point to the multiple violences that animate life in the wake of occupation and exile".

Israeli historian and activist Ilan Pappe named Shohat as one of a group of notable scholars, along with Sami Shalom Chetrit, who have "done much to expose" the "invidious process of de-Arabisation" that the Mizrahim were put through when arriving in the new state of Israel.

On the Arab Jew, Palestine and Other Displacements was the winner of the Middle East Monitor Palestine Book Award 2017 for Memoir.

Ella Shohat's work has been translated into many languages including Arabic, Hebrew, French, Spanish, Portuguese, German, Polish, Turkish, Italian and Japanese.

== Publications ==
=== Books ===
- Colonialité et Ruptures: Écrits sur les figures juives arabes, Essays selected and introduced by Joelle Marelli & Tal Dor, and translated into French by Marelli, Lux Éditeur, Canada, 2021.
- On the Arab-Jew, Palestine, and Other Displacements: Selected Writings of Ella Shohat. London, Pluto Press, 2017.
- Between the Middle East and the Americas: The Cultural Politics of Diaspora (coedited with E. Alsultany), The University of Michigan Press, 2013. Honorable Mention in the Non-Fiction category for the Arab American Book Award, Arab American National Museum.
- Race in Translation: Culture Wars around the Postcolonial Atlantic (coauthored with R. Stam), New York University Press, 2012.
- Flagging Patriotism: Crises of Narcissism and Anti-Americanism (co-authored with Robert Stam).
- Le sionisme du point de vue de ses victimes juives: les juifs orientaux en Israel (first published in 1988, with a new introduction, Paris; La Fabrique Editions, 2006).
- Taboo Memories, Diasporic Voices (Duke University Press, 2006).
- Multiculturalism, Postcoloniality and Transnational Media (coedited, Rutgers University Press, 2003).
- Zikhronot Asurim (Hebrew, Forbidden Reminiscences, Bimat Kedem LeSifrut with the Alternative Information Center, 2001).
- Talking Visions: Multicultural Feminism in a Transnational Age. (MIT & The New Museum of Contemporary Art, 1998).
- Dangerous Liaisons: Gender, Nation, and Postcolonial Perspectives (Co-edited with McClintock, Anne & Amir Mufti), University of Minnesota Press, 1997.
- Unthinking Eurocentrism: Multiculturalism and the Media (coauthored with Robert Stam, 1994), 20th Anniversary 2nd Edition, with a new Afterward Chapter, "Thinking about Unthinking: Twenty Years After" (1-73 pages) London: Routledge, 2014. Katherine Kovacs Singer Best Film Book Award for 1994.
- Israeli Cinema: East/West and the Politics of Representation (University of Texas Press, 1989), 20th Anniversary Edition with a New Postscript Chapter, London, I.B. Tauris, 2010.

=== Articles ===
- "Disorienting Cleopatra: A Modern Trope of Identity" in The Black in the Mediterranean Blue: The Anniversary Issue, Transition, Number 132, 2021, pages 148-169.
- "The Invention of Judeo-Arabic", Interventions: International Journal of Postcolonial Studies, Routledge, Volume 19, Issue 2, 2017, pages 153–200.
- "Lost Homelands, Imaginary Returns: The Exilic Literature of Iranian and Iraqi Jews", in Moments of Silence: Authenticity in the Cultural Expressions of the Iran-Iraq War (1980-1988), Arta Khakpour, Mohammad Mehdi Khorrami & Shouleh Vatanabadi, eds. New York University Press, 2016, pages 20–58.
- "The Question of Judeo-Arabic(s): Itineraries of Belonging", in Languages of Modern Jewish Cultures: Comparative Perspectives, Joshua Miller and Anita Norich, eds. University of Michigan Press, 2016, pages 94–149.
- "The Specter of the Blackamoor: Figuring Africa and the Orient", in Re-Significations: European Blackamoors, Africana Reading, edited by Awam Amkpa. Rome: Postcart SRL, 2016.
- "A Voyage to Toledo: 25 Years After the 'Jews of the Orient and Palestinians' Meetin", Jadaliyya, September 30, 2014.
- "The Question of Judeo-Arabic" Opening Essay, Arab Studies Journal, 23:1 (Fall 2015), pages 14-76.
- "Remembering a Baghdad Elsewhere: An Emotional Cartography", Biography, 37:3 (Summer 2014), pages 784-790
- "The Sephardi-Moorish Atlantic: Between Orientalism and Occidentalism", in Between the Middle East and the Americas: The Cultural Politics of Diaspora, edited by Ella Habiba Shohat and Evelyn Azeeza Alsultany. Ann Arbor: University of Michigan Press, 2013.
- "Transnationalizing Comparison: The Uses and Abuses of Cross-Cultural Analogy" (with R. Stam), Special focus, "Comparison," New Literary History, 40: 3 (Summer 2009), pages 473-499.
- "The ‘Postcolonial’ in Translation: Reading Said in Hebrew" (a special issue on Edward Said, edited by Rashid Khalidi,) Journal of Palestine Studies, XXXIII, number 3 (Spring 2004), pages 55-75.
- "The Shaping of Mizrahi Studies: A Relational Approach", Israel Studies Forum, Volume 17, Number 2, (Spring 2002): pages 86-93.
- "Notes on the" Post-Colonial", Social Text 31/32 (1992): pages 99-113.
- "Rethinking Jews and Muslims: Quincentennial Reflections", Middle East Report, number 178 (1992): pages 25-29.
- "Dislocated Identities: Reflections of an Arab Jew", Movement Research: Performance Journal # 5 (Fall Winter, 1992). Segments from Ella Shohat's essay are included in Elia Suleiman's New York-based film Homage by Assassination (1992).
- "Sephardim in Israel: Zionism from the standpoint of its Jewish victims", Social Text, 19/20 (1988): pages 1-35.

=== Edited special issues ===
- "Edward Said: A Memorial Issue" (coedited with Patrick Deer and Gyan Prakash), Social Text 87 (Summer 2006) pages 1–144.
- "Corruption in Corporate Culture" (coedited with Randy Martin), Social Text 77 (Winter 2003) pages 1–153
- "Palestine in a Transnational Context" (coedited with Timothy Mitchell & Gyan Prakash), Social Text 75 (Summer 2003) pages 1–162
- "911-A Public Emergency?" (co-edited with Brent Edwards, Stefano Harney, Randy Martin, Timothy Mitchell, Fred Moten), Social Text 72 (Fall 2002), pages 1–199

=== Participation in films ===
- Samir, Forget Baghdad: Jews and Arabs – The Iraqi Connection Switzerland 2002. Documentary. (The film is the Winner of Best Documentary, Swiss Film Prize; And of the Critics Week Award, Locarno International Film Festival.
- Interview for a DVD Documentaries on Rambo III, Afghanistan: Land of Crisis and Guts and Glory, produced by Laura Nix, Artisan Home Entertainment, 2002.
- Commentary/Interviewee, Fresh Blood, Video Essay by b.h. Yael, Canada, 1996.
- Contributor to script and voice over reading for Elia Suleiman's film Homage by Assassination (28 min) 1992.

Elia Suleiman's film incorporates a few segments from Shohat's article, written during the 1990-91 Gulf War. Shohat & Suleiman rewrote the segments as a letter from Ella Habiba Shohat to her friend Elia Suleiman. As Suleiman receives the faxed letter, Shohat is heard in a voice-over reading from "Reflections of an Arab-Jew."
