= Zionism from the Standpoint of Its Victims =

1979 essay by Palestinian-American scholar Edward Said

"Zionism from the Standpoint of Its Victims" is an essay by Palestinian-American academic Edward Said, published in 1979 as part of a broader set of writings that Said had titled The Question of Palestine. It joins a broad field of scholarship that engages in investigations of the role of nationalism and imperialism across the globe. In this essay, Said aims to address a distinct lack of discussion on Zionism (i.e., Jewish nationalism, the official ideology of Israel) from the perspective of the Palestinian Arabs. Though it was compiled decades ago, it has remained relevant in academic discourse due to the ongoing failure of the Israeli–Palestinian peace process. Ultimately, Said argues that the Zionist ideology is a continuation of Western imperialism, which has erased the voice and history of the Palestinian Arabs, framing Palestine as empty and ancestrally belonging to the Jewish people.

== Summary ==
=== Part I. History ===
The essay's first section contextualizes Said's argument in the history of the region. He begins by explaining the emergence of orientalism in European colonial societies; Europe has always been fascinated with the “Orient.” However, following World War I and an increase in settler colonialism, the fascination with the “Orient” transformed into the “problems of dealing with the Orient.” The Middle East was included in designations of Oriental places, and at the center of European concern in the region was Palestine.

Said traces the origin of Zionism to Palestine, resulting from the Jewish European colonization of Arab Palestinians in their effort to establish Israel—the Jewish state. The subsequent violence and destruction, including the 1947–1949 Palestine War, resulted in the displacement of thousands of native Palestinians, fueling their refugee crisis. The justification for the Zionist project and founding of Israel in the region lies in the Balfour Declaration, by which the British government defines Palestine as the “national home for the Jewish people.” It is within this historical context that Said positions his analysis of Zionism and associated settler-colonial projects in the lives of native Palestinians.

=== Part II. The "Empty Land" Logic of Zionism ===
Said defines Zionism as “a constant idea that expresses the yearning for Jewish political and religious self-determination – for Jewish national selfhood – to be exercised on the promised land.” In this section, he goes on to interrogate the underlying ideologies and processes behind Zionism. Critically, he argues Zionism must be studied historically through the concepts of genealogy, and accumulation and displacement. Beginning such an analysis, Said finds Zionism has two characteristics; an affirmative characteristic grounding it in Western prerogatives to civilize and democratize untamed barren landscapes, and a negative characteristic associating Arab Palestinians with inferior “Others” which silences and erases their voices and histories in the academic and public canons.

Any historical analysis of Zionism is inherently faced with overcoming the burden of being perceived as antisemitic. He acknowledges that as a whole, the Zionist project and the success of Israel are important to the global Jewish population. However, criticism of anti-Zionists purely by associating them with antisemitism prevents productive academic conversations on the issue of Palestine. Said continues, that such a position ignores the roots of the Zionist project as an inherently violent erasure of Arab Palestinian populations and histories, maintaining the underlying imperialist and settler-colonial logic.

Said supports his argument in this section by reviewing the work of liberal authors such as English novelist George Eliot and German-Jewish philosopher Moses Hess. Both figures ultimately uphold the notion that the land conquered to form Israel was “empty” of inhabitants. It is because of disagreements over issues such as the presence of Palestinian inhabitants prior to colonization, that Said claims Palestinians and Jewish settlers are unable to recognize each other's perspectives of Zionism. Said concludes this section by proposing his work to historically archive the Palestinian experience of Zionism is an important part of constructing a “counter-memory” to contest the version of the Zionist project which normalizes the process of imperial and colonial transformation of land to a global audience.

=== Part III. Epistemology ===
In this section, Said focuses on the epistemological effects of Zionism made visible in the modes of Israeli governance of non-Jewish peoples. These modes of Zionist governance were aimed to “minimize, then to eliminate, then all else failing, finally to subjugate the natives as a way of guaranteeing that Israel would be…the state of the whole Jewish people…” The Israeli government made two strategic shifts which paved the way for legislation supporting the Zionist project to be implemented. First, the process of displacing Arabs to make way for Jews, was reframed as a project to "re-establish” Palestine. Second, the contested land was described as undesirable, directly as a result of neglect from the Arab inhabitants. Thus, the Zionist colonial agenda aimed to retake the land that had ancestrally been theirs and provide appropriate care for it so that the Jewish population might exclusively reap any benefits. This all came at the cost of the opposing and threatening Arab Palestinians. Depiction of a villainous Arab was reproduced in popular media such as children's books, legitimizing the efforts to remove Arab non-Jews from the re-built Palestine territory.

Palestinian resistance to the plan was attempted but with little success. This was largely due to the detail and specificity of the Zionist plan to produce an ideal Israeli future society. Said elaborates on several pro-Zionist policies and government agencies which operated as mechanisms for the apartheid, discrimination, and subjugation of Palestinians. Examples include the “Outline of Program for the Jewish Resettlement of Palestine in Accordance with the Aspirations of the Zionist Movement” in 1917, the Jewish National Fund, the Absentee Property Law of 1950, the Land Acquisition Law of 1953, the Law for the Requisitioning of Property in Time of Emergency of 1949, and the Prescription Law of 1958.

The Palestinian response lacked the same level of specificity to present a coherent counter project which could garner international support. International attitudes continued to favor Zionists; for example, the “Zionism is Racist” resolution, passed by the United Nations in 1975, faced outcry in the West. Ultimately Said argues, these logics and attitudes facilitated the continued dehumanization of non-Jewish Palestinians allowing them to be alienated from land and subjected to economic and physical violence.

=== Part IV. Palestinian Effectiveness ===
Said argues that further gains of territory and significant gap in power between Israel and Palestinian Arabs meant resistance to Zionism, such as efforts by the Palestine Liberation Organization, continued to falter. This was accompanied by an aversion by Palestinian Arabs to share their experiences and chronicle their history. Said predicts that this trend will decrease over time. In fact, he identifies what he terms, “Palestinian effectiveness,” as evidence of a shift towards a productive discussion of Palestinian Arab history, by Palestinian Arabs. This effectiveness is defined as unifying a divided Palestinian Arab diaspora to analyze the challenges of displacement and marginalization, and using the motivations and insights learned from this exercise to imagine and pursue a better future.

=== Part V. Conclusion ===
In the final section of this publication, Said summarizes that successes in Palestinian political organization, proposals to establish a democratic Palestinian State - inclusive of Palestinian Arabs and the Jewish population - and increases in political resistance in the public sphere, help frame discussion of potential peace agreements and a future Palestine. Said's final recommendation is for academics to continue theoretical analysis and criticism of the complex issue he has introduced. Specifically, he delineates the following topic areas as those with significant potential for continued study in the context of the Israeli-Palestine conflict: (1) Human rights, (2) violence, state terrorism and revolutionary resistance, (3) Free speech and cultural freedom, (4) the role of intellectuals and constructions of the Other.

== Reception and criticism ==
Said's essay sparked continued debate over the question of Zionism and Palestinians. Support for Said's critique of Zionism and its impacts on Palestinians came in the form of scholars such as the Israeli-American professor Ella Shohat, whose 1988 article "Sephardim in Israel: Zionism from the Standpoint of Its Jewish Victims" alluded to the title of Said's essay. However, others from within and outside American and European academia made criticisms similar to those mentioned by Said in Part II. of the essay. For instance, a response (published in the same journal as Said's essay) cited the events of the Holocaust as justification for the Zionist project. Two years later, the essay was translated into Hebrew, and was quickly deemed controversial by its new audience. Historian Yigal Elam responded directly to Said by arguing that the western democratic ideals Zionism was based on are the primary solution for the conflict between Israel and Palestinians. Elam also blames the Palestinians’ reliance on violence after being unwilling to engage in democratic solutions as a primary source of continued conflict.

== See also ==
- Arab–Israeli conflict
- Bibliography of the Arab–Israeli conflict
- Orientalism
- Palestinian nationalism
- Zionism as settler colonialism

== Bibliography ==
- Mufti, Aamir and Ella Shohat. "Introduction." In Anne McClintock, Aamir Mufti, and Ella Shohat, Dangerous Liaisons: Gender, Nations, and Postcolonial Perspectives. (1997): 1–12.
- Said, Edward W. "Zionism from the Standpoint of Its Victims." Social Text No. 1, (Winter, 1979): 7–58.
- Shohat, Ella. "The "Postcolonial" in Translation." In Sylvia Nagy-Zekmi, Paradoxical Citizenship: Edward Said. (2006). 24-47.
- Tadiar, Neferti X. M. "Empire." Social Text No. 26, (2009): 112–117.
