= Cultural archive =

Cultural archive is a term associated with social anthropologist Wendy James referencing the repository of knowledge found in everyday interactions that individuals reference to validate their existence in the world. This term was coined during James' research of the Uduk people of Sudan in the 1990's.

The term is most commonly associated with Culture and Imperialism, the 1993 collection of essays by postcolonial theorist Edward Said. The term first appears in reference to Rudyard Kipling's Kim and Said suggests the cultural archive is a major site where investments in imperial conquest are developed. These archives include "narratives, histories, and travel tales." Said emphasizes the role of the Western imperial project in the disruption of cultural archives, and theorizes that disciplines such as comparative literature, English, and anthropology can be directly linked to the concept of empire.

Gloria Wekker's 2016 book White Innocence: Paradoxes of Colonialism and Race utilizes a scavenger methodology by "work[ing] with interviews, watching TV and reading novels, analyzing email correspondence..." in order to develop a clear understanding of the Dutch cultural archive. According to Wekker, her book is "guided by the concept of the cultural archive (Said 1993), which foregrounds the centrality of imperialism to Western culture. The cultural archive has influenced historical cultural configurations and current dominant and cherished self-representations and culture. In a general nineteenth-century European framework, Edward Said describes the cultural archive as a storehouse of "a particular knowledge and structures of attitude and reference . . . [and,] in Raymond Williams' seminal phrase, 'structures of feeling.' . . . There was virtual unanimity that subject races should be ruled, that there are subject races, that one race deserves and has consistently earned the right to be considered the race whose main mission is to expand beyond its own domain". (1993, 52, 53) Importantly, what Said is referring to here is that a racial grammar, a deep structure of inequality in thought and affect based on race, was installed in nineteenth-century European imperial populations and that it is from this deep reservoir, the cultural archive, that, among other things, a sense of self has been formed and fabricated". (p. 2)
