= Elora Shehabuddin =

Scholar of gender and women's studies

- Spouse: Ussama Makdisi
- Parent(s): K. M. Shehabuddin; Khaleda Shehabuddin
- Awards: Aaron Wildavsky Award (2002); Ananda Kentish Coomaraswamy Book Prize (2023)

Academic background
- Education: Harvard University (AB); Princeton University (PhD)

Academic work
- Discipline: Gender and women's studies, Political science, Postcolonial studies
- Institutions: University of California, Irvine; Rice University; University of California, Berkeley
- Notable works: Reshaping the Holy (2008); Sisters in the Mirror (2021)

Elora Shehabuddin is a Bangladeshi American scholar of gender and women's studies whose research focuses on Muslim women, feminism, and politics in Bangladesh.

She is a professor of gender and women's studies and global studies at the University of California, Berkeley; here, she is the director of the Global Studies program, and the Subir and Malini Chowdhury Center for Bangladesh Studies.

== Early life and education ==
Shehabuddin was born in West Pakistan to Bengali parents from Chittagong, in what was then East Pakistan, while her father was awaiting his first overseas posting with the Pakistan Foreign Service. Her parents are the diplomat K. M. Shehabuddin and Khaleda Shehabuddin.

== Education ==
Shehabuddin received her bachelor's in social studies from Harvard University and a PhD in politics from Princeton University. From 1999 to 2001 she was an assistant professor of women's studies and political science at the University of California, Irvine.

From 2001 to 2022, She worked at Rice University. She joined University of California, Berkeley in 2022.

== Research ==
Shehabuddin's research examines the relationship between Islam, gender, and politics in Bangladesh, Reshaping the Holy drew on field research among women in Bangladesh, while Sisters in the Mirror draws on documents, fiction, educational writing, oral histories, photographs, and travel accounts by Bengalis, Britons, and Americans.

=== Early work ===
Her first book, Empowering Rural Women: The Impact of Grameen Bank in Bangladesh was published in 1992. Her Princeton dissertation, "Encounters with the State: Gender and Islam in Rural Bangladesh", received the American Political Science Association's 2002 Aaron Wildavsky Award for the best dissertation on religion and politics.

=== Reshaping the Holy (2008) ===
Reshaping the Holy: Democracy, Development, and Muslim Women in Bangladesh was published by Columbia University Press in 2008. Drawing on fieldwork among poor rural women, it looks at how political parties, religious leaders, NGOs and the state competed for their support in the 1990s and early 2000s. Shehabuddin developed the project as a research associate in Harvard Divinity School's Women's Studies in Religion Program in 2004 and 2005.

The book discusses the fatwas issued in Bangladeshi villages from the early 1990s, under which some women accused of adultery were ordered to be whipped or stoned. Shehabuddin had written earlier about one such case, in which a 22-year-old woman named Nurjahan was dragged from her home in Sylhet District in January 1993 to be punished for adultery. The practice continued after a 2001 High Court ruling banned it; the Bangladesh Mahila Parishad counted 39 women subjected to fatwas in 2002.

Religious leaders also accused NGOs, especially BRAC, of converting women to Christianity. In late 1993 and early 1994, mulberry trees that women had planted through BRAC programs were cut down in several districts, and more than 110 BRAC schools were reportedly set on fire between January and March 1994.

The book and her 2008 Modern Asian Studies article look at how the Bangladesh Jamaat-e-Islami approached women. Because the party contested elections, Shehabuddin writes, it had to care about numbers, and it tried to win women voters by stressing its qualified support for women's education, paid work and participation in politics. Its leaders also invoked women's status as mothers to answer NGOs that called Islam harmful to women. This marked a departure from the view of the party's founder, Abul A'la Maududi, that women belonged in the home. She attributes the change to "twin pressures": working within a democratic system, and competing with secular groups for the votes of poor women. She also argues that the rural women she studied did not see their lives as a choice between Islam and modernity, and wanted to keep and reshape their faith rather than give it up.

Other scholars have taken up the Jamaat argument. In their introduction to Islamic Reform in South Asia (2013), Filippo and Caroline Osella point to her account of how the Jamaat, apparently one of the most ideologically firm reformist organizations, makes compromises and shifts position in practice. Samia Huq of BRAC University reads the shift Shehabuddin describes as politically expedient, driven by the party's need for votes from women whose lives had changed through paid work and NGO programs. Huq also notes Shehabuddin's suggestion that the party's narrow engagement with gender relations may have limited its wider appeal.

Columbia University Press presented the book as moving the study of Islam away from a focus on the Middle East and on religious and legal texts, toward South Asia and Muslims' lived experience. Her 1999 article on fatwas was reprinted in Gender, Politics, and Islam (University of Chicago Press, 2002), and the 2008 Jamaat article in Islamic Reform in South Asia.

The book was reviewed by John F. Easterling in Missiology (2009), by sociologist Shelley Feldman in the Journal of Asian Studies (2010), and by Zachary T. Irwin in Politics and Religion (2011). Feldman described it as a welcome addition to knowledge of Bangladesh, Islam and development practice.

=== Sisters in the Mirror (2021) ===
Sisters in the Mirror: A History of Muslim Women and the Global Politics of Feminism was published by the University of California Press in 2021, with a South Asian edition from University Press Limited in Dhaka in 2022. Shehabuddin has said she began the book in response to the many books published after the September 11 attacks that framed Western intervention as a way of rescuing Muslim women. Its eight chapters follow encounters between people from Bengal, Britain and the United States in roughly chronological order. The book argues that feminist ideas in the West and in Muslim Bengal developed in relation to each other, shaped by unequal economic, political and military power.

The book discusses encounters between Bengal, Britain and the United States through the accounts of travellers. Among them are Mirza Sheikh I'tesamuddin, a Mughal munshi who left Bengal in 1765 and reached Britain in 1766, and Shamsunnahar Mahmud, who visited the United States in the 1950s; Shehabuddin describes both as having attracted public curiosity abroad. The book also discusses Catarina de San Juan, who was enslaved by the Portuguese and is described in some accounts as a Bengali Muslim.

Shehabuddin argues that representations of Muslim women have been used in Western debates about gender. She discusses late eighteenth-century English writers, including Mary Wollstonecraft, whom she presents as having contrasted English women with an image of idle and secluded "Eastern" women. She applies this analysis to Western coverage of Taslima Nasrin in 1994 and to the war on terror, and argues that organizations such as the Feminist Majority Foundation were closely aligned with United States government policy.

The book also covers activism by Bengali Muslim women, including Rokeya Sakhawat Hossain's advocacy of women's education and campaigns on education and polygamy by Muslim feminists during the Cold War. Shehabuddin places this activism in the context of colonial and international policy. She notes that the 1871 census recorded Muslims in Bengal and Assam as more than half of British India's Muslim population, and that Bangladesh became the largest recipient of international population-control funding after independence.

The cover reproduces Mirror, a work by Bangladeshi artist Tayeba Begum Lipi.

==== Reception ====
Sisters in the Mirror was reviewed in the Journal of Asian Studies, Gender, Place & Culture, Ethnic and Racial Studies, South Asian History and Culture, Asiatic, the Journal of Bangladesh Studies and The Daily Star.

In the Journal of Asian Studies, Nandini Deo wrote that the book describes Western and Muslim feminists developing their ideas about women in relation to one another. Faiza Muhammad-din of the Humboldt University of Berlin wrote that the book departs from a common practice in gender studies of beginning with Anglophone feminist scholarship. Md. Mahmudul Hasan of the International Islamic University Malaysia, writing in The Daily Star, stated that the book counters a tendency to equate Muslims with Arabs and Bengal with Hinduism. He also criticized its extensive use of direct quotation and disputed its interpretation of Rokeya Sakhawat Hossain as regarding all religions as harmful to women, arguing that Rokeya's criticism was directed at misogynist interpreters rather than at Islamic scripture.

Subsequent studies of anti-Muslim racism and of Muslim women's agency have cited the book in discussing how Western writers and early English feminists used the image of the oppressed Muslim woman.

The book was named a 2022 Choice Outstanding Academic Title and received the 2023 Ananda Kentish Coomaraswamy Book Prize from the Association for Asian Studies.

== Personal life ==
Shehabuddin is married to the historian Ussama Makdisi.

== Selected works ==
- Shehabuddin, Elora (2008). Reshaping the Holy: Democracy, Development, and Muslim Women in Bangladesh. Columbia University Press. ISBN 9780231141567.
- Shehabuddin, Elora (2021). Sisters in the Mirror: A History of Muslim Women and the Global Politics of Feminism. University of California Press. ISBN 9780520342514.
- Shehabuddin, Elora (1999). "Beware the bed of fire: gender, democracy, and the Jama'at-i Islami in Bangladesh". Journal of Women's History. 10 (4): 148–171.
