= Mariam C. Said =

American writer and activist

- مريم سعيد
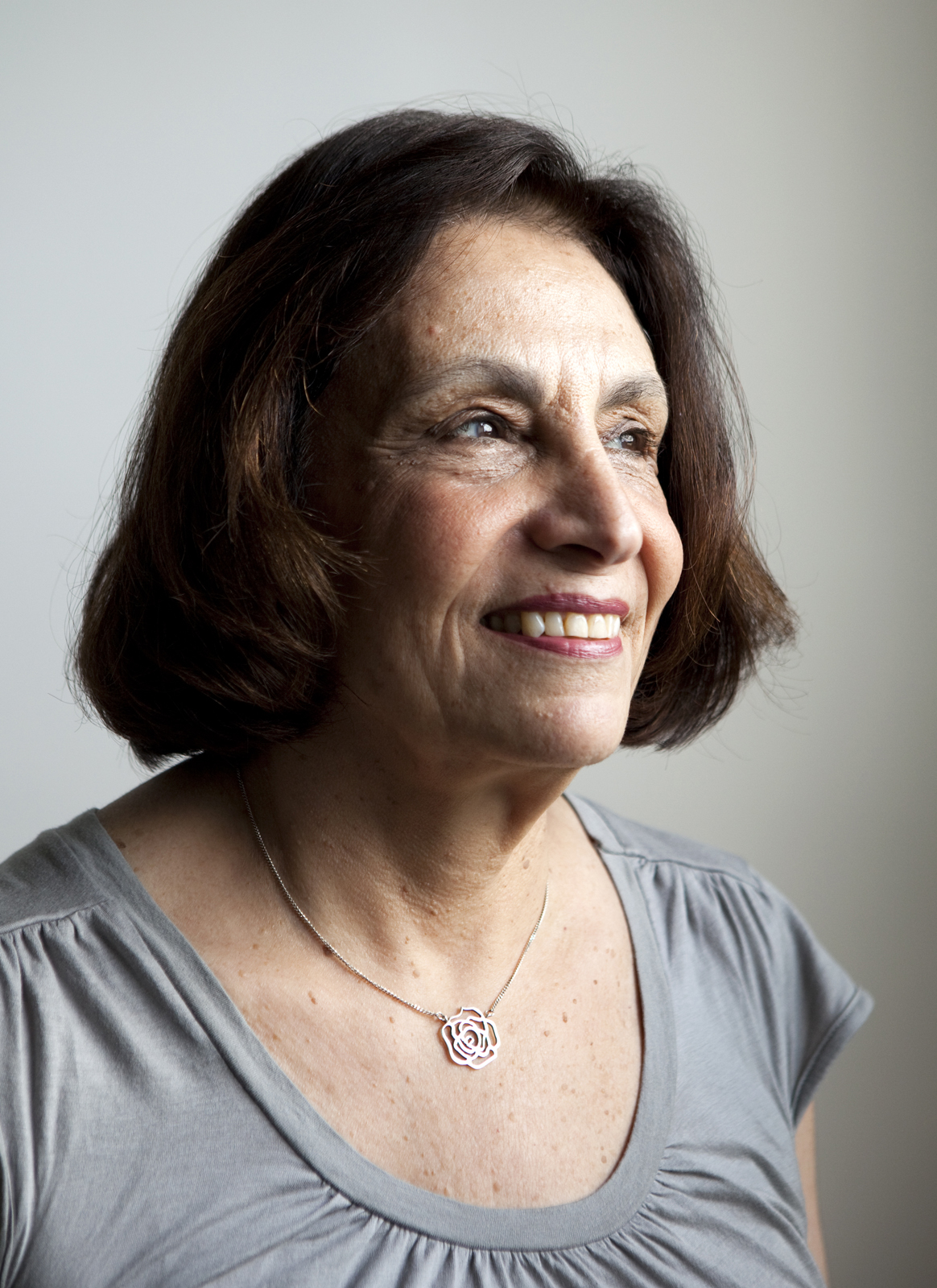
- Born: Beirut, Lebanon
- Spouse: Edward Said (m. 1970; died 2003)

Mariam C. Said (Arabic: مريم سعيد) is a Lebanese-American writer and activist. She is the widow of Palestinian-American academic and activist Edward Said.

== Biography ==
Mariam C. Said was born and raised in Beirut, Lebanon, to Quaker parents who were of Palestinian and Lebanese origin. Her father, Emile Cortas, was the leading figure of the Quaker community in Lebanon and founder of the canning company Cortas. She holds an undergraduate degree from the American University of Beirut (AUB) in Lebanon and two graduate degrees from Columbia University. For more than 20 years, she worked in the financial services industry in New York City.

In 2009, Said published the critically acclaimed memoir, A World I Loved: The Story of an Arab Woman by her mother Wadad Makdisi Cortas. Said collaborated with Vanessa Redgrave to conceive and create a theatre production based on the memoir. The success of its premiere at the Brighton Festival in 2012 led to a performance at the Miller Theatre in New York.

== Activism ==
Said is the Vice-President of the Barenboim-Said Foundation (USA) and co-steward of the Barenboim-Said Akademie.

She is a founding member of the board of the American-Arab Anti-Discrimination Committee.

She serves in the West-Eastern Divan Orchestra (WEDO) which was founded by her husband Edward Said and the musician Daniel Barenboim, as well as Senza Frontiere in Italy and the Alumni Association of North America, American University of Beirut.

She serves on the boards on several organisations including the Freedom Theatre in Jenin, Palestine and ArteEast in New York.

== Recognition ==
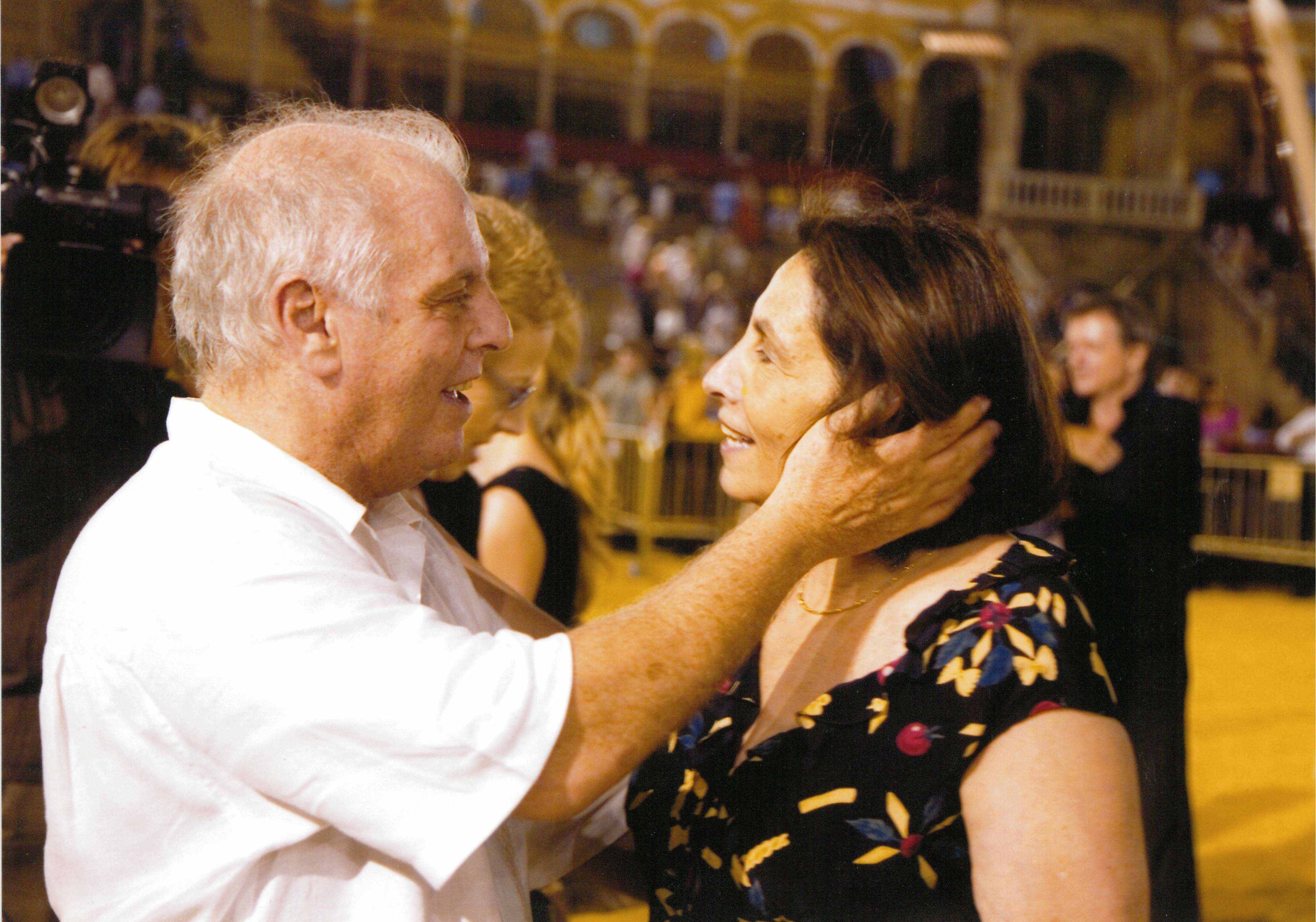
Mariam Said and Daniel Barenboim

In recognition of her dedication to the continuing success of the WEDO, Said received an honorary doctorate from the Universidad Nacional de Tres de Febrero Buenos Aires, Argentina, in 2014. In a 2012 interview with the Wiener Zeitung, she described the philosophy of the WEDO and the BSA as follows:

“Think of the principle of counterpoint: single voices are recognized as independent objects. The final result is harmony on a higher level. We are not a political but a cultural and humanitarian project. Understanding is the start of reducing mistrust. We are the microcosm of a society that does not exist yet.”

== Personal life ==
Said was married to the late academic and writer Edward Said.

She has two children, the author Najla Said and a son, Wadie who is a law professor.

== Publications and interviews ==
- "Mariam Said on the West-Eastern Divan Orchestra." PBS NewsHour, February 5, 2013: YouTube link
- "Zeitgenossen. Mariam C. Said." Wiener Zeitung, September 28, 2013 Wienerseitung link
- "The World That Mariam Said Loved. Edward Said's Widow Collaborates With Vanessa Redgrave." Forward, December 15, 2012: Forward link
- "Welcoming address by Mariam Said at the Edward Said Memorial Conference", April 15, 2013, Centre for the Humanities at Utrecht University: YouTube link
- Interview with Ricardo Karam, April 4, 2014 YouTube link
- Wadad Makdisi Cortas: “A World I Loved”. Edited by Mariam C. Said, with a foreword by Nadine Gordimer. New York 2009: Nation Books. ISBN 978-1568584294
- Mariam C. Said: “Barenboim-Said Foundation does not promote normalization.” Electronic Intifada, March 17, 2010. Electronic Intifada link
- Mariam C. Said: Foreword, in: Edward W. Said. "On Late Style. Music and Literature Against the Grain." New York: Pantheon Books, 2006.
