= Gloria Wekker =

Dutch educator and writer

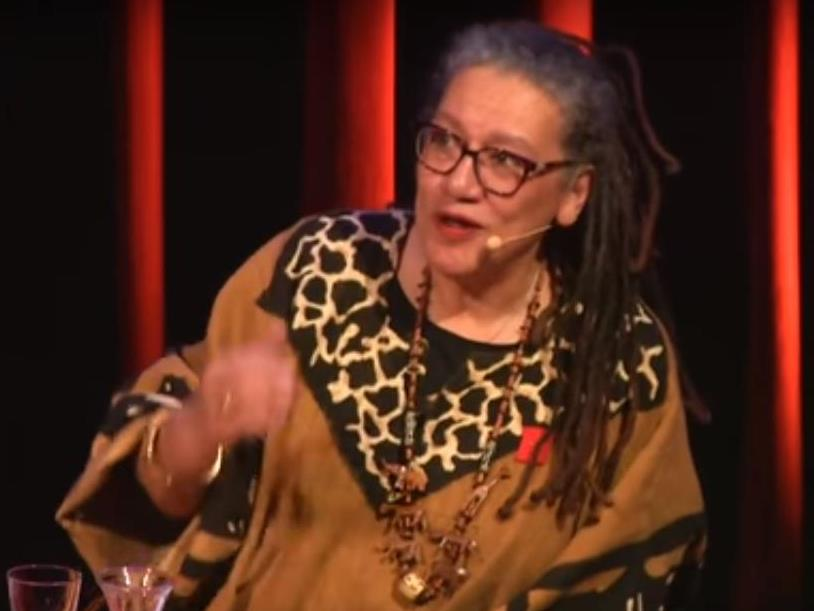
- Wekker (2016)
- Born: June 13, 1950 (age 76); Paramaribo, Suriname
- Occupations: educator, writer
- Years active: 1981–present
- Known for: Critical race theory, Afro-Caribbean and gender studies
- Notable work: The Politics of Passion, White Innocence

Gloria Daisy Wekker (born June 13, 1950) is an Afro-Surinamese Dutch emeritus professor (Utrecht University) and writer who has focused on gender studies and sexuality in the Afro-Caribbean region and diaspora. She was the winner of the Ruth Benedict Prize from the American Anthropological Association in 2007.

== Biography ==
Gloria Wekker was born in 1950 in Paramaribo, Suriname. Her family migrated to the Netherlands when she was a one year old infant and lived in a neighborhood in Amsterdam that had formerly been predominantly Jewish prior to WWI. She returned to Amsterdam in the 1970s and became active in the Afro-European Women's Movement. Wekker earned a master's degree in cultural anthropology from the University of Amsterdam in 1981 and began her career working in various governmental agencies in Amsterdam, such as the Ministry of Health, Welfare and Culture on Ethnic Minorities' Affairs and the Ministry of Social Affairs and Employment. In 1984, she became a founding member of "Sister Outsider", an Amsterdam-based, literary circle for lesbian black women named after the work by Audre Lorde. In 1987, she served as a Policy Associate in the Office for the Coordination of Ethnic Minorities' Affairs.

In 1992, Wekker earned her doctorate at the University of California, Los Angeles with a thesis on the sexuality and subjectivity of Afro-Surinamese women. In 2001, she was appointed to the Aletta-chair of the Department of Women's Studies at the Utrecht University. Her work focuses on the intersections of colonialism, racism, white privilege, feminist theory, lesbian theory and women in the Caribbean. Her work has earned her the title of "Holland’s Angela Davis" as she has forced the Dutch to examine their alleged ingrained stereotypes and attitudes towards racism and patriarchy. She has led debate which questioned the racist nature of such iconic images in Dutch tradition as Sinterklaas (Santa Claus)'s helpers as blackface golliwogs known as Zwarte Piet (Black Pete), as well as the imagery of what constitutes beauty.

Wekker was nominated in 2004 for the Dutch Scientific Research Council's "Triomfprijs" (Triumph prize). In 2006, her book The Politics of Passion: Women's Sexual Culture in the Afro-Surinamese Diaspora won critical praise and was awarded with the 2007 Ruth Benedict Prize from the American Anthropological Association. Wekker gave the 2009 Mosse Lecture, titled Van Homo Nostalgie en betere tijden. Multiculturaliteit en postkolonialiteit (On Gay Nostalgia and better times. Multiculturalism and postcolonialism). In 2011, she began a sabbatical to work at the Netherlands Institute for Advanced Studies on a research project, which resulted in the publication in 2016 of White Innocence: Paradoxes of Colonialism and Race. In this book, Wekker utilizes a scavenger methodology by "work[ing] with interviews, watching TV and reading novels, analyzing email correspondence..." in order to develop a clear understanding of the Dutch cultural archive. Because of her work with both sociology and policy, Wekker led an international committee which was appointed at the University of Amsterdam in 2015 to increase diversity at the university. The committee published their findings in the report Let's do diversity in 2016.

== Selected works ==
- Wekker, Gloria (1986). Oog in oog: over het werk van Audre Lorde (in Dutch). Utrecht, The Netherlands: Savannah Bay.
- Wekker, Gloria; Wekker, Herman (1990). 'Coming in from the cold': linguistic and socio-cultural aspects of the translation of Black English Vernacular literary texts into Surinamese Dutch (in Dutch). Leiden, The Netherlands: Vakgroep Engels.
- Wekker, Gloria (1992). "I am gold money": (I pass through all hands, but I do not lose my value): the construction of selves, gender and sexualities in a female working class, Afro-Surinamese setting (Ph.D.). University of California, Los Angeles.
- Wekker, Gloria (1994). Ik ben een gouden munt, ik ga door vele handen, maar verlies mijn waarde niet: subjectiviteit en seksualiteit van Creoolse volksklasse vrouwen in Paramaribo (in Dutch). Amsterdam, the Netherlands: VITA.
- Wekker, Gloria (1997). "One finger does not drink okra soup: Afro-Surinamese women and critical agency". Feminist Genealogies, Colonial Legacies, Democratic Futures. New York, NY: Routledge: 330–352.
- Wekker, Gloria (1998). "Thamyris". Feminist Genealogies, Colonial Legacies, Democratic Futures. 5 (1). Leiden, The Netherlands: Brill Publishers: 105–129.
- Wekker, Gloria (2001). "Mati-ism and black lesbianism: two idealtypical expressions of female homosexuality in black communities of the diaspora". In Constantine-Simms, Delroy (ed.). The Greatest Taboo: Homosexuality in Black Communities. Los Angeles, California: Alyson Books. pp. 149–162. ISBN 978-1-55583-564-4.
- Wekker, Gloria (2002). Nesten bouwen op een winderige plek : denken over gender en etniciteit in Nederland (in Dutch). Utrecht, The Netherlands: Universiteit Utrecht, Faculteit der Letteren. ISBN 978-907-6-91223-3.
- Wekker, Gloria (2001). Of mimic men and unruly women: exploring sexuality and gender in Surinamese family systems. Cave Hill, Barbados: University of the West Indies.
- Wekker, Gloria (2006). The Politics of Passion: Women's Sexual Culture in the Afro-Surinamese Diaspora. New York, New York: Columbia University Press. ISBN 978-0-231-13162-9.
- Wekker, Gloria (2009). "Afro-Surinamese women's sexual culture and the long shadows of the past". In Barrow, Christine; Bruin, Marjan de; Carr, Robert (eds.). Sexuality, Social Exclusion & Human Rights: Vulnerability in the Caribbean Context of HIV. Kingston, Jamaica: Ian Randle Publishers. pp. 192–214. ISBN 978-976-637-395-5.
- Wekker, Gloria (2016). White Innocence: Paradoxes of Colonialism and Race. Duke University Press. doi:10.1215/9780822374565. ISBN 9780822374565.

== Sources ==
- Batra, Kanika (13 April 2011). Feminist Visions and Queer Futures in Postcolonial Drama: Community, Kinship, and Citizenship. Routledge. ISBN 978-1-136-88754-3.
- Catalogus Professorum Academiae Rheno-Traiectinae
- Wekker, Gloria. “5: The Mati Work.” The Politics of Passion: Women’s Sexual Culture in the Afro-Surinamese Diaspora, Columbia University Press, New York, New York, 2006, pp. 171–222.
- Wekker, G. (1996). Mati-ism and Black Lesbianism: Two Idealtypical Expressions of Female Homosexuality in Black Communities of the Diaspora. Journal of Lesbian Studies, 1(1), 11–24. https://doi.org/10.1300/J155v01n01_03
- Wekker, G., Slootman, M. W., Icaza Garza, R., Jansen, H., & Vázquez, R. (2016, January). Let's do Diversity : report of the University of Amsterdam Diversity Commission. Retrieved from http://hdl.handle.net/1765/95261
