= Ahliah School =

Private school in Beirut, Lebanon

Coordinates: 33.89666°N 35.49764°E

Ahliah school
- Beirut, Lebanon

Information
- School type: Independent school
- Founded: 1906
- Founder: Mary Kassab
- Grades: KG1 - Grade 12
- Gender: Co-Educational
- Language: English
- Accreditation: Council of International Schools
- Website: www.ahliahschool.edu.lb

The Ahliah School is a private, coeducational institution located in Beirut, Lebanon, and has played a significant role in the region's educational landscape. Amidst within the framework of colonial-era educational reforms mandated to France by the League of Nations, Lebanon witnessed the emergence of various types of schools, each contributing to the broader colonial administrative, political, and cultural context. In this context, Ahliah emerged as a private, coeducational institution that transcended sectarian, religious, and class divisions. Among Lebanon's diverse socio-cultural fabric, Ahliah School adopted an anti-sectarian approach that welcomed students from various socio-cultural backgrounds.

== Mary Kassab School ==
In 1916, when the Ottoman authorities ordered the closing of foreign schools, Mary (Marie) Kassab, daughter of Selim Kassab, gathered in her home sixteen boys and girls who were enrolled at the British School and pledged to ensure their continuing education. Parents began to send their children to her, which became the nucleus of Ahliah School. The following year, sixty students were enrolled, and Kassab was authorized to open a national, non-denominational and coeducational school.

Initially, Mary Kassab founded Ahliyya in 1906, in her living room, before moving it to a separate building in 1916. Ahliyya school was known for its non-sectarian approach. Its purpose was to instill in its students integrity, consciousness, and the autonomy of thought in the awareness of a postwar regional order. The cultural politics of the school were rooted in the concept of a Lebanon with an Arabo-Islamic cultural history, and the sense of “Lebaneseness”, which has attracted families with similar political goals, from different religions, sects, and, later, nationalities.

With the help of her brother Aziz and two of his friends, Boulos Khawli and Anis Makdissi, she formed a board of trustees. The board raised funds from Lebanese and Arab residents and Lebanese emigrants, and were able to purchase the present campus of Ahliah from the Scottish mission.

The school embraced the new scouting movement which included all Lebanese children and Alice Abkarios at Ahliah undertook the translation of the scouting rules into Arabic.

The Mandate authorities attempted to tighten their control over the school. Al-Ahliah was strongly anticolonial and antisectarian, with Arabic language skills being an important part of the curriculum. The students and teachers demonstrated staunch anticolonial sentiments and resistance against French teachers imposed by the Mandate authorities. In 1924, the Mandate authorities ordered its closing. The students (predominantly girls) organized a rally and walked into the Government Palace to defend the cause of the school before the High Commissioner. The French authorities repealed the decision.

== Al-Ahliah Girls’ College ==
In 1950, Mary Kassab School became Ahliah Girls’ College, in arabic al-madrasa al-ahliyya li al-banat. Boys were admitted at the elementary level only. The second principal, Wadad Makdisi Cortas, took office in 1937. To her, the Ahliah education was about more than improving reading and writing skills: it was essentially about creating awareness amongst it students about the female position within a broader national and regional order. The vision behind this was for students to learn about the multicommunalism of the newly emerging Lebanese state, while at the same time situating it within the broader Arab world. To create this pan-Arabist awareness, teachers would cover Arabic philosophy, science, literature and grammar. This was based on their own knowledge, since a general textbook on the history of Syria and Lebanon did not exist yet. On top of that, the curriculum also included regular field trips across political boundaries, such as to Haifa, Baghdad and Cairo. These educational activities also formed subtle strategies of anti colonial resistance against the French mandate administration.

Another way the Al-Ahliah Girl's College resisted against the French mandate administration was by transcending the sectarian boundaries that they projected on the Lebanese population. The biggest part of the educational system in Lebanon consisted of private schools organized along sectarian lines. Al-Ahliah Girl's College had an explicitly non-sectarian approach to nation-making, by aiming to create a "community of knowledge". Within this community of knowledge, sectarian divides were not important. The creation of an Arabic sense of Lebanese nationalism was the most important element of the educational program.

A music academy was started, under the leadership of Alexis Boutros. Ahliah's choir represented Lebanon in many capitals of the world, with some one hundred performances on their record.

The Ford Foundation equipped the school's science laboratories as a model.

== Regional Enrolment and Educational Networks ==
After Wadad Makdisi Cortas became headmistress in 1937, Ahliah added a boarding house and expanded its enrolment of girls from other Arab countries. During the French Mandate, its boarders included students from Palestine, Egypt, Irqa, Syria and Tunisia. Diplomats and other foreign nationals also enrolled their children, seeking nonsectarian education and Arabic-language instruction. After 1948, Palestinian students who had previously attended French Catholic schools in jerusalem entered Ahliah, often following family connections established by mothers or aunts who had studied there.

Ahliah also maintained educational and administrative connections with the Maqasid Islamic Benevolent Society. A two-volume history textbook written by Maqasid teachers Mustapha and Zaki Naqqash was used at Ahliah. Umar Da'uq, a leading Maqasid board member, also served on Ahliah's board of consultants and directors. Da'uq and Cortas helped establish the Secondary School Principal's Association, which met regularly in the years before and after Lebanese independence.

== Al-Ahliah School in Beirut ==
Situated in the heart of old Beirut, Al-Ahliah found itself at the center of battles during the Lebanese Civil War (1975–1990) and its buildings sustained heavy damage. The demography of the neighborhood changed dramatically, to include the families of the displaced. Its academic standards also suffered severely because of the departure of many of its faculty and students.

For the first and most violent two years of the war, al-Ahliah closed. It reopened in 1977, under the leadership of Mr. Nicholas Zayyat, previously a teacher of mathematics of senior classes at the school.

Throughout the war years, the main concerns of Mr. Zayyat together with other members of the school administration were to guarantee the security of students and to preserve the school's buildings and infrastructure. Unable to keep former academic standards, Mr. Zayyat was keen on continuing the humanitarian and patriotic mission of the school by providing education to the numerous severely disadvantaged students and to children of parents reduced by the war to becoming squatters in its vicinity, though often these parents were unable to pay full fees. Eventually wartime Al-Ahliah had 750 students enrolled. By this time it had become coeducational.

Despite the dangers and insecurities faced, the idea of moving the school from its historic location was repeatedly rejected by Al-Ahliah's Board of Trustees.

== Cultural Activities ==
During the French Mendate, Ahliah organised educational excursions within Lebanon and to Haifa, Baghdad and Cairo. According to historian Nadya Sbaiti, these excursions were intended to familiarise students with Lebanon's different communities while reinforcing their connections to the wider Arab world. The artist Saloua Raouda Choucair attended Ahliah, where she contributed caricatures to the school newspaper.

== Post civil war improvements ==
After the war ended, a new principal, Dr. Najla Hamadeh, a graduate of the school and a member of its Board of Trustees, was appointed to execute its revival.

== Campus ==
The campus consists of two buildings purchased in 1916 from a Scottish mission.

== Notable alumni ==
- Saloua Raouda Choucair
