= Rosemarie Said Zahlan =

Palestinian-American historian and writer (1937–2006)

- روزماري سعيد زحلان
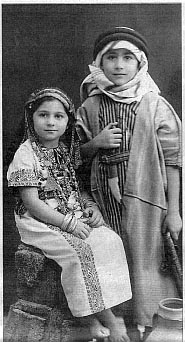
- Rosemarie and her brother Edward in Jerusalem, 1940
- Born: Rosemarie Janet Said; 20 August 1937; Cairo, Egypt
- Died: 10 May 2006 (aged 68)
- Education: Bryn Mawr College; SOAS University of London
- Spouse: Antoine Zahlan
- Family: Edward Said (brother); Jean Said Makdisi (sister)

Rosemarie Janet Said Zahlan (Arabic: روزماري سعيد زحلان, romanized: Rawzimārī Saʿīd Zaḥlān; 20 August 1937 – 10 May 2006) was a Palestinian-American historian and writer on the Arab states of the Persian Gulf, based in London. She was a sister of Edward Said and Jean Said Makdisi. In addition to her books, she also wrote for the Financial Times, The Middle East Journal, the International Journal of Middle East Studies, and the Encyclopaedia of Islam.

== Biography ==
Rosemarie Janet Said was born in Cairo, Egypt, in 1937. Her father, Wadie, was a wealthy Anglican Palestinian businessman and a US citizen, while her mother, Hilda, was born in Nazareth to a Palestinian-Lebanese family. She attended Bryn Mawr College in the United States, studying musicology.

Afterwards, Said Zahlan taught in Cairo. She then went to Beirut, where she lectured on cultural history at the American University of Beirut and the Beirut College for Women. After Beirut, she went to London to get her PhD (about the Red Sea route to India and its 18th-century history pioneer, George Baldwin) at the School of Oriental and African Studies, receiving the degree in 1968. She was also an honorary research fellow at the University of Exeter's Institute of Arab and Islamic Studies. Said Zahlan lived in London for nearly four decades.

She married Antoine "Tony" Zahlan, a Palestinian physicist and academic from Haifa. Together they championed the Gaza Library Project, supplying books to Palestine. Rosemarie Said Zahlan was also a patron of the Palestine Solidarity Campaign in Britain.

== Bibliography ==
- Zahlan, A. B.; Zahlan, Rosemarie Said, eds. (1978). Technology transfer and change in the Arab world: the proceedings of a seminar of the United Nations Economic Commission for Western Asia. Oxford: Published for the United Nations by Pergamon Press. ISBN 978-0-08-022435-0.
- Zahlan, Rosemarie Said (1978). The origins of the United Arab Emirates: a political and social history of the Trucial States. New York: Macmillan. ISBN 978-0-333-24109-7.
- Zahlan, Rosemarie Said (1979). The creation of Qatar. London: Croom Helm. ISBN 978-0-06-497965-8.
- Zahlan, Rosemarie Said (1989). The making of the modern gulf states: Kuwait, Bahrain, Qatar, The United Arab Emirates and Oman. London: Unwin Hyman. ISBN 978-0-04-445430-4.

== See also ==
- Palestinian Christians
