= Culture and Imperialism =

Book by Edward Said

- Cover of the first edition
- Author: Edward Said
- Language: English
- Subject: Imperialism
- Published: 1993
- Publisher: Chatto & Windus
- Media type: Print
- ISBN: 978-0679750543

Culture and Imperialism is a 1993 collection of thematically related essays by Palestinian-American academic Edward Said, tracing the connection between imperialism and culture throughout the 18th, 19th, and 20th centuries. The essays expand the arguments of Orientalism to describe general patterns of relation, between the modern metropolitan Western world and their overseas colonial territories.

== Subject ==
In the work, Said explored the impact British novelists such as Jane Austen, Joseph Conrad, E.M. Forster, and Rudyard Kipling had on the establishment and maintenance of the British Empire, and how colonization, anti-imperialism, and decolonization influenced Western literature during the 19th and 20th centuries. In the beginning of the work, Said claims that the Daniel Defoe novel Robinson Crusoe, published in 1719, set the precedent for such ideas in Western literature; the novel being about a European man who travels to the Americas and establishes a fiefdom in a distant, non-European island.

As the connection between culture and empire, literature has "the power to narrate, or to block other narratives from forming and emerging", which might contradict the colonization of a people. Hence he analyzes cultural objects to understand how imperialism functions: "For the enterprise of empire depends upon the idea of having an empire . . . and all kinds of preparations are made for it within a culture; then, in turn, imperialism acquires a kind of coherence, a set of experiences, and a presence of ruler and ruled alike within the culture."

Imperialism is "the practice, the theory, and the attitudes of a dominating metropolitan center ruling a distant territory." His definition of "culture" is more complex, but he strongly suggests that we ought not to forget imperialism when discussing it. Of his overall motive, Said states:

"The novels and other books I consider here I analyze because first of all I find them estimable and admirable works of art and learning, in which I and many other readers take pleasure and from which we derive profit. Second, the challenge is to connect them not only with that pleasure and profit but also with the imperial process of which they were manifestly and unconcealedly a part; rather than condemning or ignoring their participation in what was an unquestioned reality in their societies, I suggest that what we learn about this hitherto ignored aspect actually and truly enhances our reading and understanding of them."

The title is thought to be a reference to two older works, Culture and Anarchy (1867–68) by Matthew Arnold and Culture and Society (1958) by Raymond Williams.

Said argues that, although the "age of empire" largely ended after the Second World War, when most colonies gained independence, imperialism continues to exert considerable cultural influence in the present. To be aware of this fact, it is necessary, according to Said, to look at how colonialists and imperialists employed "culture" to control distant land and peoples.

== Synopsis ==
Said argues that cultural productions such as literature, music, and art are shaped by the political and economic context in which they are produced. He argues that imperialism has played a significant role in shaping Western culture, and that many works of art and literature can be seen as reflections or products of imperialism.

He also explores the ways in which imperialism has been represented in cultural productions, such as novels and films, and argues that these representations have often been used to justify and perpetuate imperialism. He highlights the importance of examining cultural productions in their historical and political context, and argues that doing so can reveal the complex ways in which culture and power are intertwined. The book covers a range of topics, from the impact of colonialism on the works of Joseph Conrad and Jane Austen, to the ways in which Western films have depicted the East.

=== Chapter 1. Overlapping Territories, Intertwined Histories ===
Said says that West has positioned itself as a self-evidently superior, independently developed culture that naturally should share its civilization with inferior others via colonization, which is almost always a product of imperialism. Non-European cultures are therefore assigned a secondary status, which is paradoxically necessary for the supposed primacy of Western culture. Said argues for reading the literary canon with an awareness of these intertwined histories, that support the expansion of Western supremacy.

=== Chapter 2. Consolidated Vision ===
Said surveys several canonical works to argue that they support imperialism by the way they ignore or amplify certain narratives including works of Rudyard Kipling, Jane Austen, Giuseppe Verdi and Albert Camus.

=== Chapter 3. Resistance and Opposition ===
Resistance to imperialism is often times ignored in the Western narrative, but nevertheless, real. The voice of the colonized is not heard in the colony until independence is achieved. Said critiques the formation of a monolithic nationalism to replace a former colonial polity, instead drawing attention to the diversity and complexity of the individuals in the territory. He posits that peoples have multiple overlapping identities and shared heritage as compared to the divisiveness required by the imperial project.

=== Chapter 4. Freedom from Domination in the Future ===
The United States has replaced Europe as the self-appointed guardian of a purported superior Western civilization, and the narratives of European civilizing mission continue to this day with its center in North America. Said laments this development and believes that imperialism will not cease until we understand that no culture can claim to be superior to others, claim international authority, or direct the destinies of inferior others. Said believes that diversity is valuable and complex and cannot be reduced to simple identity symbiology. Said indicts public intellectuals in their silence towards the continuing narrative of Western exceptionalism and superiority. He exhorts them to transcend their national interests and see common interests and values across the rest of the world.

== Reception ==
Edward Said was considered "one of the most important literary critics and philosophers of the late 20th century". Culture and Imperialism was hailed as long-awaited and seen as a direct successor to his main work, Orientalism. While The New York Times review notes the book's heavy resemblance to a collection of lectures, it concludes that "Yet that telegraphic style does not finally mar either the usefulness of 'Culture and Imperialism' or its importance." The book is seen as a "classic study", and has influenced many later authors, books and articles.

Philosopher and social anthropologist Ernest Gellner criticized Said for "exploiting Western guilt about imperialism."
