= Wadad Makdisi Cortas =

Palestinian-Lebanese educator and memoirist (1909–1979)

Wadad Makdisi Cortas (Arabic: وداد مقدسي قرطاس; 1909–1979) was a Palestinian-Lebanese educator and memoirist.

== Early life and education ==
Wadad Makdisi grew up in an educated family in Beirut, and attended Ahliah National School for Girls as a child. She graduated in 1927 and enrolled at the American University of Beirut, the only one of her classmates to go on to university. After finishing her undergraduate studies, she taught in a teacher training college in Baghdad Iraq. In August 1931 she travelled to Ann Arbor for graduate studies as a Barbour Scholar (a grant to promote the spread of women's education in Asia). While in Ann Arbor she attended lectures and talks by William Butler Yeats who was appealing for the cause of a free Ireland and by Count Sforza who denounced the Italian Fascists. Between spring of 1933 and the summer of 1934, she traveled widely in Europe during this spell she also visited her cousins the Hourani's including the young Albert Hourani in Manchester.

== Career ==
Cortas worked at her alma mater, the Ahliah National School for Girls, from 1934 to 1974 for forty years. In her first year she was the deputy head mistress then as the principal, for her remaining years. She also taught at Beirut College for Women, and was on the board of the Academie Libanaise des Beaux Arts.

Cortas's memoir, Dunia Ahbab-tuha (A World I Loved) was published in Arabic in the 1960s. She translated the memoir into English and updated it in her retirement; the revised version was published posthumously, with a foreword by Nadine Gordimer, in 2009. In 2012, a stage adaptation of Cortas's book, starring Vanessa Redgrave, was produced first at the Brighton Festival, then at Columbia University, and in 2015 at the Spoleto Festival in Italy.

== Personal life ==
Cortas married a businessman from Brummana, Emile Cortas, who founded the canning company Cortas. They had four children, including the writer Mariam C. Said. Cortas had a stroke in 1972 with lasting effects; she died in 1979, aged 70 years. Her granddaughter Najla Said is an actress and playwright in New York City.
