= Saree Makdisi =

American literary critic and professor (born 1964)

- Occupation: Professor
- Parent(s): Jean Said Makdisi and Samir Makdisi
- Writing career
- Genre: Romanticism

Saree Makdisi (born 1964) is an American literary critic and professor specializing in British Romanticism. He is of Palestinian and Lebanese descent. He also writes on contemporary Arab politics and culture. Makdisi is a professor of English at the University of California, Los Angeles (UCLA).

== Life ==
Makdisi was born in Washington, United States. His father, Samir Makdisi, is a Lebanese-Palestinian professor of economics at the American University of Beirut and his mother, Jean Said Makdisi, is a Palestinian independent scholar (formerly of Beirut University College). He is also the grandson of Anis K. Makdisi, a late professor of Arabic at American University of Beirut and the nephew of the late literary scholar Edward Said. In 2009, Makdisi gave the Edward Said Memorial lecture at the University of Adelaide.

He spent his early childhood in the United States, moving to Lebanon at the age of eight. While he grew up in a Christian family, they lived "in a largely Muslim neighborhood of Beirut." Makdisi returned to the United States for his final year in high school and also attended college there. He received his Bachelor of Arts from Wesleyan University in 1987 and a PhD from Duke University in 1993. He taught for ten years as a professor of English at the University of Chicago before joining UCLA in 2003. His work has been commended for his application of psychoanalytic theory, including the theories of Freud and Lacan, to MENA societies.

On November 26, 2023, Makdisi with his two brothers, Karim and Ussama, began hosting a podcast entitled Makdisi Street

== Books ==
- Romantic Imperialism: Universal Empire and the Culture of Modernity (Cambridge University Press, 1998)
- William Blake and the Impossible History of the 1790s (University of Chicago Press, 2002)
- Palestine Inside Out: An Everyday Occupation (W. W. Norton & Company, 2008)
- Making England Western: Occidentalism, Race & Imperial Culture (University of Chicago Press, 2014)
- Reading William Blake (Cambridge University Press, 2015)
- Tolerance is a Wasteland: Palestine and the Culture of Denial (University of California Press, 2022)

== Awards ==
- 2009: Arab American Book Award honorable mention for Palestine Inside Out.
