= Anne McClintock =

Zimbabwean feminist scholar

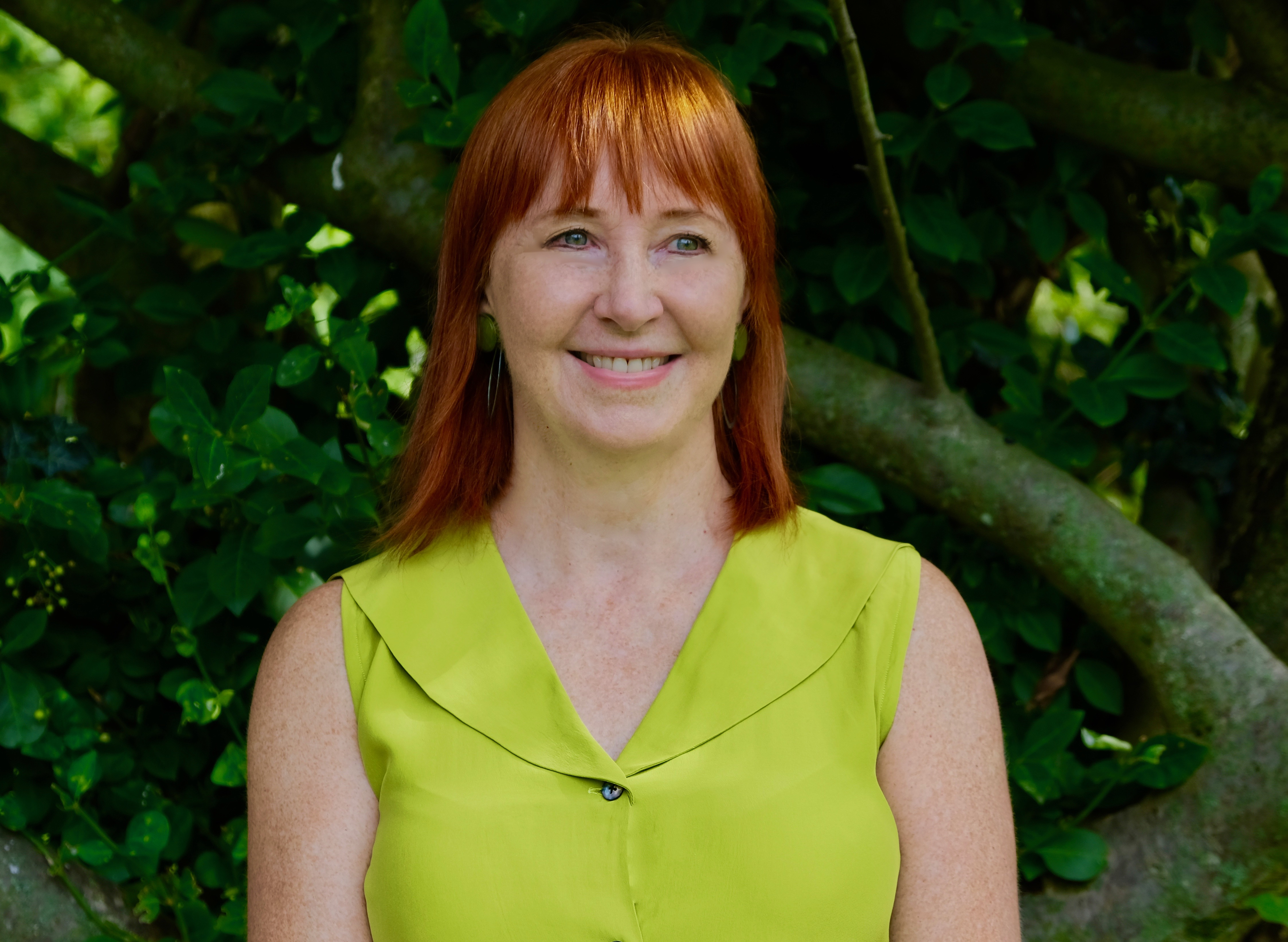

Anne McClintock
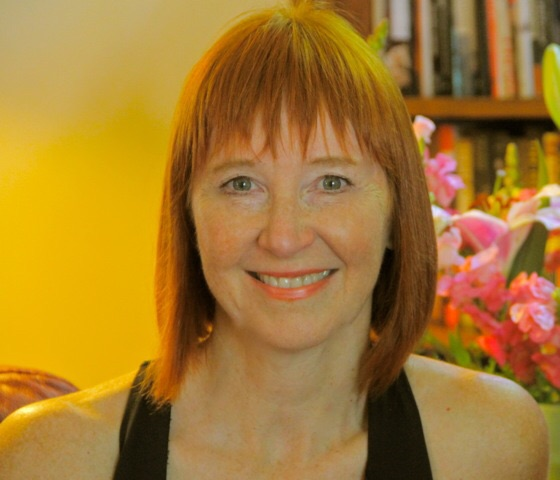
- Anne McClintock
- Born: 27 August 1954 (age 72); Harare, Zimbabwe
- Education: University of Cape Town (BA); University of Cambridge (MPhil); Columbia University (PhD)
- Occupations: Writer; Feminist scholar; Public intellectual; Photographer; Activist
- Employer: Princeton University (emerita)
- Known for: Scholarship on gender, race, sexuality, imperialism and nationalism
- Notable work: Imperial Leather; Simone de Beauvoir; Olive Schreiner; Double Crossings
- Awards: MacArthur-SSRC Fellowships; Columbia University Distinguished Human Rights Fellowship; Woodrow Wilson Fellowship; Charlotte Newcombe Fellowship

Anne McClintock (born ca. 1955) is a writer, feminist scholar and public intellectual who has published widely on issues of sexuality, race, imperialism, and nationalism; popular and visual culture, photography, advertising and cultural theory. Transnational and interdisciplinary in character, her work explores the interrelations of gender, race, and class power within imperial modernity, spanning Victorian and contemporary Britain to contemporary South Africa, Ireland, and the United States. Since 2015, McClintock has been the A. Barton Hepburn Professor at Princeton University. As of 2022, she has held a joint appointment in the Program of Gender and Sexuality and the High Meadows Environmental Institute. She is affiliated with the Department of English and the Effron Center for American Studies.

Previously, McClintock was the Simone de Beauvoir Professor of English and Women's and Gender Studies at the University of Wisconsin–Madison where she taught from 1999 to 2015. Before Wisconsin, she taught at both Columbia University and New York University.

== Early life and education ==
Anne McClintock was born to parents of Irish and Scottish descent in Harare, Zimbabwe. Her parents moved to South Africa, where McClintock grew up during the height of the anti-apartheid movement. McClintock attended the University of Cape Town where she earned her BA in Philosophy and English in 1976. In 1979, she received an M Phil in Linguistics from the University of Cambridge. McClintock earned her PhD in English Literature at Columbia University in 1989.

== Selected bibliography ==
=== Books ===
- McClintock, Anne (1995). Imperial Leather: Race, Gender and Sexuality in the Colonial Contest. New York: Routledge. ISBN 9780415908900.
  - -- -- (2018, Portuguese) Couro Imperial: Raça, Gênero E Sexualidade No Embate Colonial. Translated by Plinio Dentzien. Brazil: Editora da Unicamp. ISBN 978-85-268-0893-5.
- -- -- (1997). Dangerous Liaisons: Gender, Nation and Postcolonial Perspectives, Co-edited with Ella Shohat and Aamir Mufti. Minnesota: University of Minnesota Press. ISBN 9780816626496.
- -- -- (Forthcoming) Unquiet Ghosts: From the Forever War to Climate Chaos 1860-2015. Durham, North Carolina: Duke University Press.

=== Chapters in books ===
- -- -- (1994). "Advertising and Commodity Racism." In Travelers' Tales, edited by George Robertson, Melinda Mash, Lisa Tickner, Jon Bird, Barry Curtis, and Tim Putnam, 128-52. London: Routledge.
- -- -- (1996). "'No Longer in a Future Heaven': Gender, Race and Nationalism." InBecoming National. A Reader, edited by Geoff Eley and Ronald Suny, 260-85. Oxford: Oxford University Press.
- -- -- (1999). "Fanon and Gender Agency." In Rethinking Fanon: The Continuing Dialogue, edited by Nigel C. Gibson, 66-81. New York: Routledge,
- -- -- (2005). "Soft-Soaping Empire: Commodity Racism and Imperial Advertising." In The Body. A Reader, edited by Mariam Fraser and Monica Greco, 271-276. New York: Routledge.
- -- -- (2008). "Gender, Race and Sexuality in the Colonial Contest: The Object of Development." In The Development Reader, edited by Sharad Chari and Stuart Corbridge, 99-116. New York: Routledge.
- -- -- (2009). "Paranoid Empire: Specters from Guantanamo and Abu Ghraib." In States of Emergency, edited by Russ Castronovo and Susan Gillman, 69-87. Durham, North Carolina: University of North Carolina Press.
- -- -- (2018). "Ghostscapes from the Forever War." In Nature’s Nation: American Art and Environment, edited by Karl Kusserow and Alan Braddock, 272-290. New Haven and London: Yale University Press.
- -- -- (2023). "The Future is Now," in Collaboration: A Potential History of Photography, eds. Ariella Azoulay, Wendy Ewald, Susan Meiselas, Leigh Raiford and Laura Wexler. London: Thames & Hudson.

=== Journal and magazine articles ===
- -- -- (1984). "'Unspeakable Secrets': The Ideology of Landscape in Conrad's Heart of Darkness." Midwestern Modern Language Association 17: 38-53.
- -- -- (1986). "No Names Apart: The Separation of Word and History in Derrida’s Le dernier Mot du Racisme." Critical Inquiry 13: 140-54.
- -- -- (1987). "Azikwelwa (We Will Not Ride): Politics and Value in Black South African Poetry." Critical Inquiry 13 no. 3: 597-623.
- -- -- (1988). "Maidens, Maps and Mines: The Reinvention of Patriarchy in Colonial South Africa." South Atlantic Quarterly 87: 13-30.
- -- -- (1990). "The Very House of Difference: Race, Gender and the Politics of South African Women's Narrative." Social Text 25: 196-226. https://doi.org/10.2307/466247.
- -- -- (1991). "The Scandal of the Whorearchy." Transition 53: 92-99.
- -- -- (1992). "Screwing the System. Sex Work, Race and the Law." Boundary 2 Special Issue: Feminism and Postmodernism 19: 70-95.
- -- -- (1992). "The Angel of Progress. Pitfalls of the Term Post-Colonialism," Social Text 18: 84-98.
- -- -- (1993). "The Return of Female Fetishism and the Fiction of the Phallus." New Formations 6: 7-18.
- -- -- (1993). "Family Feuds. Gender, Nationalism and the Family," Feminist Review 44: 61-80.
- -- -- (1993). "Maid To Order: Commercial Fetishism and Gender Power," Social Text 34: 95-114.
- -- -- (2010). "Militarizing the Gulf Oil Crisis." Counterpunch. 24 June 2010. https://www.counterpunch.org/2010/06/24/militarizing-the-gulf-oil-crisis/
- -- -- (2010). "Behind the Media Blockade in the Gulf." Truthout. 4 August 2010. https://truthout.org/articles/behind-the-media-blockade-in-the-gulf/
- -- -- (2010). "Slow Violence and the BP Coverups." Counterpunch. 23 August 2010. https://www.counterpunch.org/2010/08/23/slow-violence-and-the-bp-coverups/
- -- -- (2011). "Solidarity in Madison: The Wisconsin Mass Protests." Guernica / A Magazine of Arts and Politics. 28 February 2011. http://www.guernicamag.com/anne_mcclintock_solidarity_in/
- -- -- (2011). "Wisconsin: an Epochal Standoff." Guernica / A Magazine of Arts and Politics. 15 March 2011. http://www.guernicamag.com/blog/anne_mcclintock_wisconsin_an_e/
- -- -- (2012). "The Best Way to Deal with The Spear." The Mail and Guardian (South Africa). 1 May 2012. http://mg.co.za/article/2012-05-31-the-best-way-to-deal-with-the-spear
- -- -- (2012). "Too Big to See With the Naked Eye." Guernica / A Magazine of Arts and Politics, 20 December 2012.http://www.guernicamag.com/daily/anne-mcclintock-too-big-to-see-with-the-naked-eye
- -- -- (2014). "Imperial Ghosting and National Tragedy: Revenants from Hiroshima and Indian Country in the War on Terror," PMLA 129 no. 4: 819-29.
- -- -- (2017). "Who’s Afraid of Title IX?" Jacobin Magazine, 24 October 2017. https://jacobin.com/2017/10/title-ix-betsy-devos-doe-colleges-assault-dear-colleague
- -- -- (2020). "The Last Teenagers on Isle de Jean Charles, An Island Climate Change Is Washing Away." Teen Vogue. 12 February 2020. https://www.teenvogue.com/story/isle-de-jean-charles-louisiana-juliette-brunet
- -- -- (2020). "Monster: A Fugue in Fire and Ice." e-flux Architecture, 1 June 2020. https://www.e-flux.com/architecture/oceans/331865/monster-a-fugue-in-fire-and-ice/
- -- -- (2021). "Ghost Forest. Atlas of a Drowning World," Special Issue, e-flux Architecture, 19 January 2021. https://www.e-flux.com/architecture/accumulation/440704/ghost-forest-atlas-of-a-drowning-world/
