= Ussama Makdisi =

Palestinian American historian (born 1968)

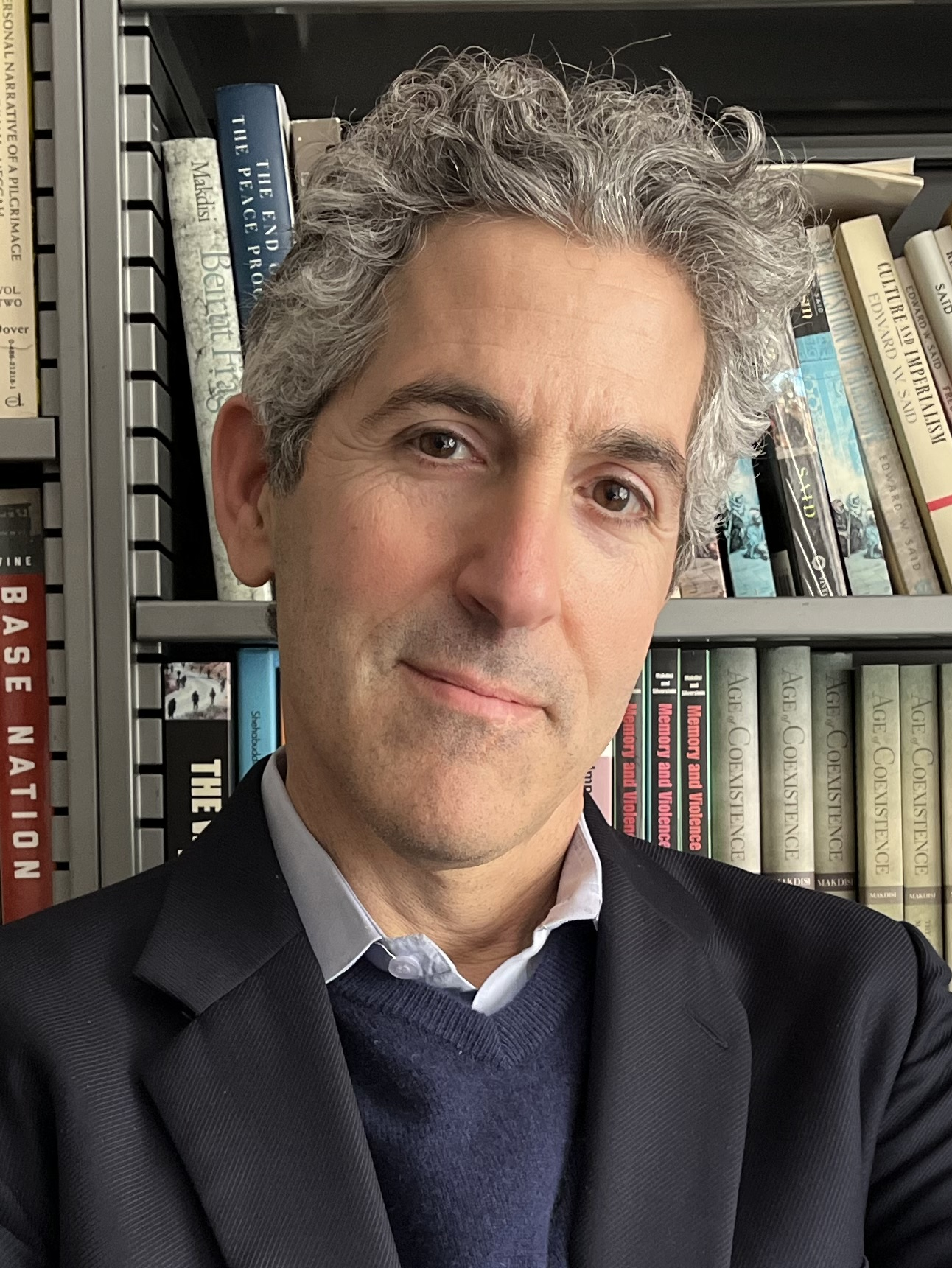
- Makdisi in 2025
- Born: 1968 (age 57–58); Washington, D.C., U.S.
- Education: Wesleyan University (BA); Princeton University (PhD)
- Occupations: Professor; author
- Spouse: Elora Shehabuddin
- Parent(s): Jean Said Makdisi (mother), Samir Makdisi (father)
- Relatives: Saree Makdisi (brother), Karim Makdisi (brother)
- Awards: Berlin Prize (2018)

Ussama Makdisi (born 1968) is a Palestinian American historian specializing in the history of the modern Middle East. He is a professor of history at the University of California, Berkeley, where he is also the Chancellor's Chair and was the May Ziadeh Chair in Palestinian and Arab Studies.

== Early life ==
Ussama Makdisi was born in 1968 in Washington, D.C., to professors Jean Said Makdisi and Samir Makdisi, in a family of academics. He is of Palestinian Christian and Lebanese Christian descent. He received a B.A. degree from Wesleyan University in 1990 and a Ph.D. in history from Princeton University in 1997.

== Academic career ==
Makdisi's research focuses on Ottoman and Arab history, Arab–American relations, and US missionary work in the Middle East.

In 1997, he became the inaugural Arab-American Educational Foundation Chair of Arab Studies at Rice University in Houston, Texas. He has also served as a visiting professor at the American University of Beirut and the School of Oriental and African Studies in London.

From 2012 to 2013, he was a resident fellow at the Berlin Institute for Advanced Study. In 2018, he was awarded the Berlin Prize.

He started a podcast, Makdisi Street, with his brothers in November 2023 to "discuss the coverage and framing of the ongoing Israeli bombardment of Gaza."

His name, among 160 students and other faculty, was shared by UC Berkeley with the Trump administration as part of an investigation into alleged antisemitic incidents. He responded in an interview on NPR and another on Occupied Thoughts by Foundation for Middle East Peace, calling the investigation a crackdown on academic freedom reminiscent of McCarthyism.

== Books ==
=== As author ===
- Age of Coexistence: The Ecumenical Frame and the Making of the Modern Arab World (University of California Press, 2019)
- Faith Misplaced: the Broken Promise of U.S.-Arab Relations, 1820-2001 (PublicAffairs, 2010)
- Artillery of Heaven: American Missionaries and the Failed Conversion of the Middle East (Cornell University Press, 2008)
- The Culture of Sectarianism: Community, History, and Violence in Nineteenth-Century Ottoman Lebanon (University of California Press, 2000)

=== As co-editor ===
- (with Paul A. Silverstein) Memory and Violence in the Middle East and North Africa (Indiana University Press, 2006)
