= Jean Said Makdisi =

Palestinian writer (born 1940)

Jean Said Makdisi (Arabic: جين سعيد مقدسي; born 1940) is a Palestinian writer and independent scholar, best known for her autobiographical writing.

== Life ==
Jean Said Makdisi was born in Jerusalem, British Mandate Palestine, to a notable academic Palestinian family. The younger sister of Rosemarie Said Zahlan and Edward Said, she was raised in Egypt and educated in the United States and England. She married a Lebanese academic of Palestinian origin, Samir Makdisi. They lived in America before moving to Beirut, Lebanon, in 1972, where she taught English and humanities at the Beirut University College.

They remained in Beirut throughout the Lebanese Civil War and the 1982 Lebanon War. Makdisi documented the city's decline in her first book, Beirut Fragments: A War Memoir (1989).

In Teta, Mother, and Me: An Arab Woman's Memoir (2005) Makdisi tells the story of three generations of Arab women: herself, her mother, Hilda Musa Said, and her grandmother, Munira Badr Musa.

She is the mother of Saree Makdisi, professor of English and comparative literature at University of California, Los Angeles; Ussama Makdisi, professor of history at the University of California Berkeley; and Karim Makdisi, professor of international politics at the American University of Beirut.

== Works ==
- Makdisi, Jean Said (1990). Beirut fragments: a war memoir. New York: Persea Books. ISBN 978-0-89255-164-4.
- Makdisi, Jean Said (2005). Teta, mother and me: an Arab woman's memoir. London: Saqi. ISBN 978-0-86356-891-6.
- al-Hout, Shafiq (2010). Makdisi, Jean Said; Asser, Martin (eds.). My life in the PLO: the inside story of the Palestinian struggle. Translated by al-Hout, Hader; Othman, Laila. London: Pluto Press. ISBN 978-0-7453-2883-6.
- Makdisi, Jean Said; Bayyūmī, Nuhá; Ṣaydāwī, Rafīf Riḍā, eds. (2014). Arab feminisms: gender and equality in the Middle East. Contemporary Arab scholarship in the social sciences. Vol. 7. Translated by Khoury, Ellen. London: I.B. Tauris Publishers in Association With The Centre for Arab Unity Studies Lebanese Association of Women Researchers. ISBN 978-1-78076-672-0.
