= Edward Said =

Palestinian-American academic (1935–2003)

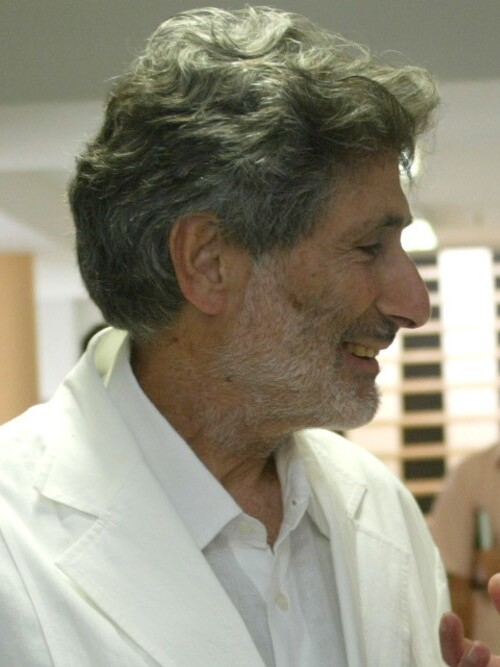
- Said in 2002
- Born: Edward Wadie Said; 1 November 1935; Jerusalem, Mandatory Palestine
- Died: 24 September 2003 (aged 67); New York City, US
- Burial place: Protestant Cemetery, Brummana, Lebanon
- Citizenship: United States
- Spouse: Mariam Cortas (m. 1970)
- Children: 2, including Najla
- Relatives: Rosemarie Said Zahlan (sister); Jean Said Makdisi (sister)

Academic background
- Education: Princeton University (BA); Harvard University (MA, PhD)
- Doctoral advisor: Monroe Engel; Harry Levin

Academic work
- School or tradition: Continental philosophy; postcolonialism
- Notable works: Orientalism (1978); Culture and Imperialism (1993)
- Notable ideas: Occidentalism; orientalism; the Other

Edward Wadie Said (Note: /sɑːˈiːd/ sah-EED; Arabic: إدوارد وديع سعيد, romanized: Idwārd Wadīʿ Saʿīd, [wædiːʕ sæʕiːd]) (1 November 1935 – 24 September 2003) was a Palestinian and American academic, literary critic, and political activist. As a professor of literature at Columbia University, he was among the founders of post-colonial studies. As a cultural critic, Said is best known for his book Orientalism (1978), a foundational text which critiques the cultural representations that are the bases of Orientalism—how the Western world perceives the Orient. His model of textual analysis transformed the academic discourse of researchers in literary theory, literary criticism, and Middle Eastern studies.

Born in Jerusalem, Mandatory Palestine, in 1935, Said was a United States citizen by way of his father, who had served in the United States Army during World War I. After the 1948 Palestine war, he relocated the family to Egypt, where they had previously lived, and then to the United States. Said enrolled at the secondary school Victoria College while in Egypt and Northfield Mount Hermon School after arriving in the United States. He graduated from Princeton University in 1957 and received a doctorate in English literature from Harvard University in 1964. His principal influences were Antonio Gramsci, Frantz Fanon, Aimé Césaire, Michel Foucault, and Theodor W. Adorno.

In 1963, Said joined Columbia University as a member of the English and Comparative Literature faculties, where he taught and worked until 2003. He lectured at more than 200 other universities in North America, Europe, and the Middle East.

As a public intellectual, Said was a member of the Palestinian National Council supporting a two-state solution that incorporated the Palestinian right of return, before resigning in 1993 due to his criticism of the Oslo Accords. He advocated for the establishment of a Palestinian state to ensure political and humanitarian equality in the Israeli-occupied territories, where Palestinians have witnessed the increased expansion of Israeli settlements. However, in 1999, he argued that sustainable peace was only possible with one Israeli–Palestinian state. He defined his oppositional relation with the Israeli status quo as the remit of the public intellectual who has "to sift, to judge, to criticize, to choose, so that choice and agency return to the individual".

== Early life and education ==
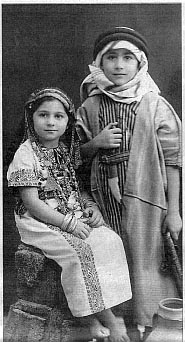
Said and his sister, Rosemarie Said, dressed in traditional Arab clothing, 1940

Said was born on 1 November 1935 into a family of Palestinian Christians in the city of Jerusalem, at the time under the British Mandate for Palestine. His parents were born in the Ottoman Empire: his mother Hilda Said (née Musa) was half Palestinian and half Lebanese, and was raised in the city of Nazareth; and his father Wadie "William" Said was a Jerusalem-based Palestinian businessman. Both Hilda and Wadie were Arab Christians, adhering to Protestantism. During World War I, Wadie served in the American Expeditionary Forces, subsequently earning United States citizenship for himself and his immediate family.

In 1919, Wadie and his cousin established a stationery business in Cairo, Egypt.

Although he was raised Protestant, Said became an agnostic in his later years.

Said's childhood was split between Jerusalem and Cairo: he was enrolled in Jerusalem's St. George's School, a British boys' school run by the local Anglican diocese, but stopped going to his classes when growing intercommunal violence between Palestinian Arabs and Palestinian Jews made it too dangerous for him to continue attending, prompting his family to leave Jerusalem at the onset of the 1947–1949 Palestine War. By the late 1940s, Said was in Cairo, enrolled at the Cairo branch of Victoria College. However, he was expelled in 1951 for troublesome behaviour, though his academic performance was high. Having relocated to the United States, Said attended Northfield Mount Hermon School in Massachusetts—a socially elite, college-prep boarding school where he struggled with social alienation for a year. Nonetheless, he continued to excel academically and achieved the rank of either first (valedictorian) or second (salutatorian) out of a class of 160 students.

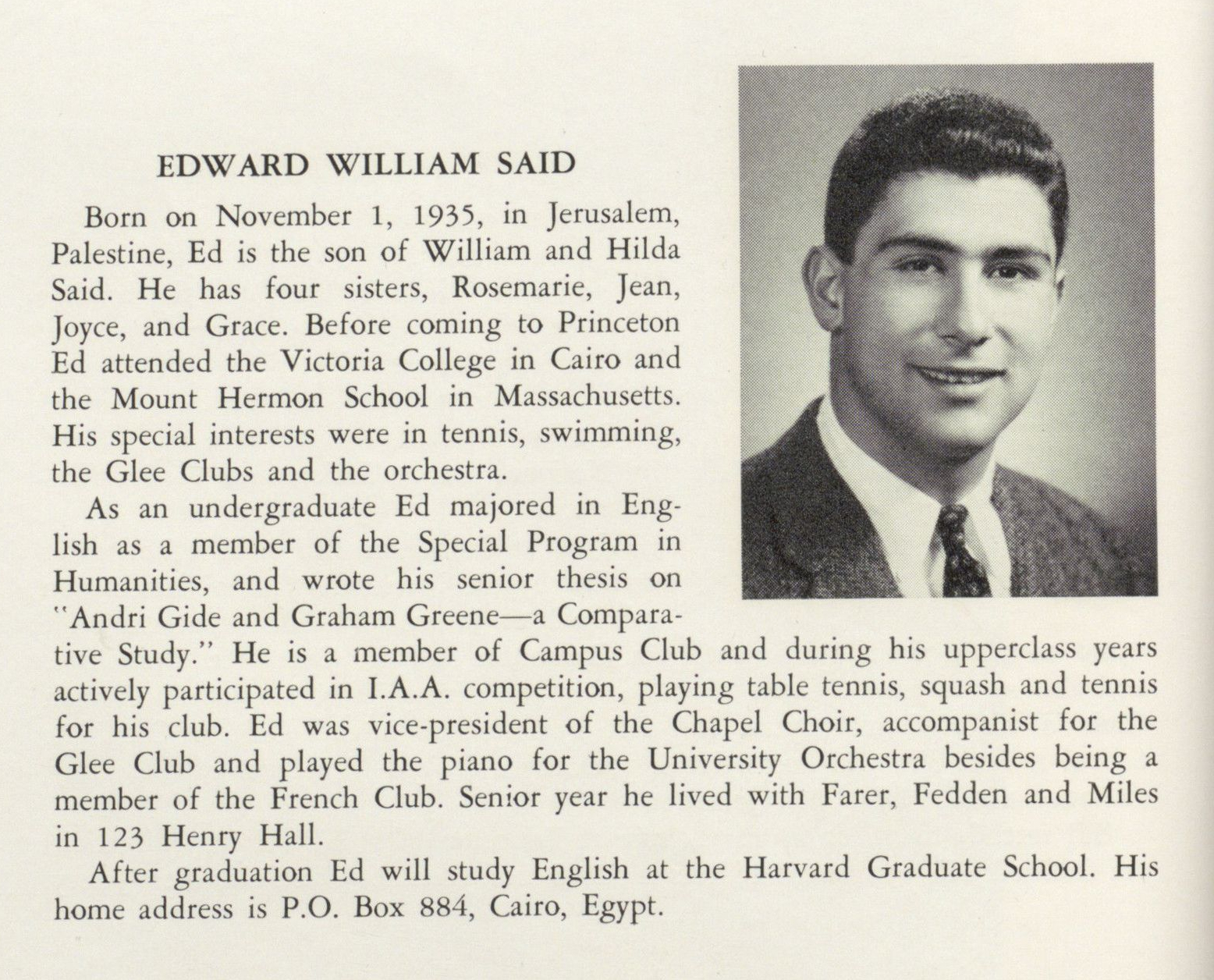
Said in the Princeton University yearbook, 1957

In retrospect, he viewed being sent far from the Middle East as a parental decision much influenced by "the prospects of deracinated people, like us the Palestinians, being so uncertain that it would be best to send me as far away as possible." The realities of peripatetic life—of interwoven cultures, of feeling out of place, and of homesickness—so affected the schoolboy Edward that themes of dissonance feature in the work and worldview of the academic Said. At school's end, he had become Edward W. Said, and was fluent in English, French, and Arabic. He graduated with an AB in English from Princeton University in 1957 after completing a senior thesis titled The Moral Vision: André Gide and Graham Greene. He later received Master of Arts (1960) and Doctor of Philosophy (1964) degrees in English literature from Harvard University.

== Academic career ==
In 1963, Said joined Columbia University as a member of the English and Comparative Literature faculties, where he taught and worked until 2003. In 1974, he was Visiting Professor of Comparative Literature at Harvard; during the 1975–76 period, he was a Fellow of the Center for Advanced Study in Behavioral Science, at Stanford University. In 1977, he became the Parr Professor of English and Comparative Literature at Columbia University, and subsequently was the Old Dominion Foundation Professor in the Humanities; and in 1979 was Visiting Professor of Humanities at Johns Hopkins University.

Said also worked as a visiting professor at Yale University, and lectured at more than 200 other universities in North America, Europe, and the Middle East. Editorially, Said served as president of the Modern Language Association, as editor of the Arab Studies Quarterly in the American Academy of Arts and Sciences, on the executive board of International PEN, and was a member of the American Academy of Arts and Letters, the Royal Society of Literature, the Council of Foreign Relations, and the American Philosophical Society. In 1993, Said presented the BBC's annual Reith Lectures, a six-lecture series titled Representation of the Intellectual, wherein he examined the role of the public intellectual in contemporary society, which the BBC published in 2011.

In his work, Said frequently researches the term and concept of the cultural archive, especially in his book Culture and Imperialism (1993). He states the cultural archive is a major site where investments in imperial conquest are developed, and that these archives include "narratives, histories, and travel tales." Said emphasizes the role of the Western imperial project in the disruption of cultural archives, and theorizes that disciplines such as comparative literature, English, and anthropology can be directly linked to the concept of empire.

== Literary and cultural criticism ==
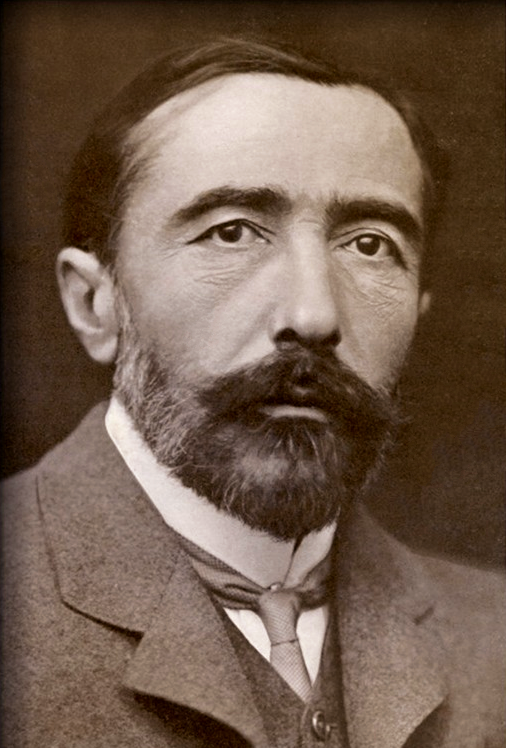
The 19th-century novelist Joseph Conrad is the subject of Said's first book, Joseph Conrad and the Fiction of Autobiography (1966).

=== Early scholarship ===
Said's first published book, Joseph Conrad and the Fiction of Autobiography (1966), was an expansion of the doctoral dissertation he presented to earn the PhD degree. Abdirahman Hussein said in Edward Saïd: Criticism and Society (2010), that Conrad's novella Heart of Darkness (1899) was "foundational to Said's entire career and project". In Beginnings: Intention and Method (1974), Said analyzed the theoretical bases of literary criticism by drawing on the insights of Vico, Valéry, Nietzsche, de Saussure, Lévi-Strauss, Husserl, and Foucault.

=== Orientalism ===
Said became an established cultural critic with the book Orientalism (1978), a critique of Orientalism as the source of the false cultural representations in western-eastern relations. The thesis of Orientalism proposes the existence of a "subtle and persistent Eurocentric prejudice against Arabo-Islamic peoples and their culture", which originates from Western culture's long tradition of false, romanticized images of Asia, in general, and the Middle East in particular. Said wrote that such cultural representations have served as implicit justifications for the colonial and imperial ambitions of the European powers and of the US. Likewise, Said denounced the political and the cultural malpractices of the regimes of the ruling Arab elites who he felt internalized the false and romanticized representations of Arabic culture that were created by Anglo-American Orientalists.

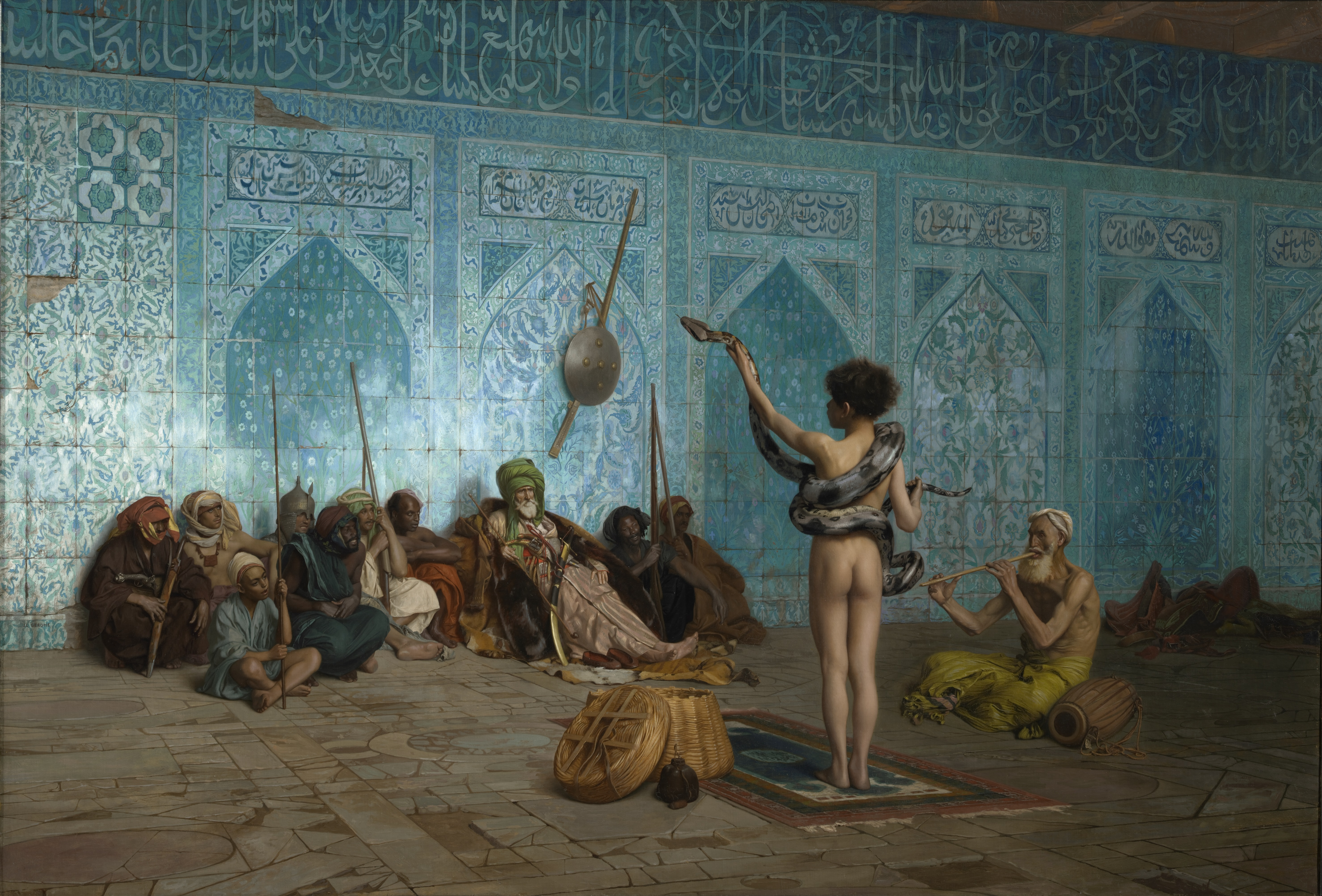
The cover of the book Orientalism (1978) is a detail from the 19th-century Orientalist painting The Snake Charmer, by Jean-Léon Gérôme (1824–1904).

Orientalism proposed that much Western study of Islamic civilization was political intellectualism, meant for the self-affirmation of European identity, rather than objective academic study; thus, the academic field of Oriental studies functioned as a practical method of cultural discrimination and imperialist domination—that is to say, the Western Orientalist knows more about "the Orient" than do "the Orientals".

Western Art, Orientalism continues, has misrepresented the Orient with stereotypes since Antiquity, as in the tragedy The Persians (472 BCE), by Aeschylus, where the Greek protagonist falls because he misperceived the true nature of The Orient. The European political domination of Asia has biased even the most outwardly objective Western texts about The Orient, to a degree unrecognized by the Western scholars who appropriated for themselves the production of cultural knowledge—the academic work of studying, exploring, and interpreting the languages, histories, and peoples of Asia. Therefore, Orientalist scholarship implies that the colonial subaltern (the colonised people) were incapable of thinking, acting, or speaking for themselves, thus are incapable of writing their own national histories. In such imperial circumstances, the Orientalist scholars of the West wrote the history of the Orient—and so constructed the modern, cultural identities of Asia—from the perspective that the West is the cultural standard to emulate, the norm from which the "exotic and inscrutable" Orientals deviate.

==== Reception and debate ====
Orientalism provoked much professional and personal criticism for Said among academics. Traditional Orientalists, such as Albert Hourani, Robert Graham Irwin, Nikki Keddie, Bernard Lewis, and Kanan Makiya, suffered negative consequences, because Orientalism affected public perception of their intellectual integrity and the quality of their Orientalist scholarship. The historian Keddie said that Said's critical work about the field of Orientalism had caused, in their academic disciplines:

Some unfortunate consequences ... I think that there has been a tendency in the Middle East [studies] field to adopt the word Orientalism as a generalized swear-word, essentially referring to people who take the "wrong" position on the Arab–Israeli dispute, or to people who are judged "too conservative." It has nothing to do with whether they are good or not good in their disciplines. So, Orientalism, for many people, is a word that substitutes for thought, and enables people to dismiss certain scholars and their works. I think that is too bad. It may not have been what Edward Saïd meant, at all, but the term has become a kind of slogan.

In Orientalism, Said described Bernard Lewis, the Anglo-American Orientalist, as "a perfect exemplification [of an] Establishment Orientalist [whose work] purports to be objective, liberal scholarship, but is, in reality, very close to being propaganda against his subject material."

Lewis responded with a harsh critique of Orientalism accusing Said of politicizing the scientific study of the Middle East (and Arabic studies in particular); neglecting to critique the scholarly findings of the Orientalists; and giving "free rein" to his biases.

Said retorted that in The Muslim Discovery of Europe (1982), Lewis responded to his thesis with the claim that the Western quest for knowledge about other societies was unique in its display of disinterested curiosity, which Muslims did not reciprocate towards Europe. Lewis was saying that "knowledge about Europe [was] the only acceptable criterion for true knowledge". The appearance of academic impartiality was part of Lewis's role as an academic authority for zealous "anti–Islamic, anti–Arab, Zionist, and Cold War crusades." Moreover, in the afterword to the 1995 edition of the book, Said replied to Lewis's criticisms of the first edition of Orientalism (1978).

==== Academic influence and legacy ====
In academia, Orientalism became a foundational text of the field of post-colonial studies, for what the British intellectual Terry Eagleton said is the book's "central truth ... that demeaning images of the East, and imperialist incursions into its terrain, have historically gone hand in hand."

Both Said's supporters and his critics acknowledge the transformative influence of Orientalism upon scholarship in the humanities; critics say that the thesis is an intellectually limiting influence upon scholars, whilst supporters say that the thesis is intellectually liberating. The fields of post-colonial and cultural studies attempt to explain the "post-colonial world, its peoples, and their discontents", for which the techniques of investigation and efficacy in Orientalism, proved especially applicable in Middle Eastern studies.

As such, the investigation and analysis Said applied in Orientalism proved especially practical in literary criticism and cultural studies, such as the post-colonial histories of India by Gyan Prakash, Nicholas Dirks and Ronald Inden, modern Cambodia by Simon Springer, and the literary theories of Homi K. Bhabha, Gayatri Chakravorty Spivak and Hamid Dabashi (Iran: A People Interrupted, 2007).

In Eastern Europe, Milica Bakić–Hayden developed the concept of Nesting Orientalisms (1992), derived from the ideas of the historian Larry Wolff (Inventing Eastern Europe: The Map of Civilization on the Mind of the Enlightenment, 1994) and Said's ideas in Orientalism (1978). The Bulgarian historian Maria Todorova (Imagining the Balkans, 1997) presented the ethnologic concept of Nesting Balkanisms (Ethnologia Balkanica, 1997), which is derived from Milica Bakić–Hayden's concept of Nesting Orientalisms.

In The Impact of "Biblical Orientalism" in Late Nineteenth- and Early Twentieth-Century Palestine (2014), the historian Lorenzo Kamel, presented the concept of "Biblical Orientalism" with an historical analysis of the simplifications of the complex, local Palestinian reality, which occurred from the 1830s until the early 20th century. Kamel said that the selective usage and simplification of religion, in approaching the place known as "The Holy Land", created a view that, as a place, the Holy Land has no human history other than as the place where Bible stories occurred, rather than as Palestine, a country inhabited by many peoples.

The post-colonial discourse presented in Orientalism, also influenced post-colonial theology and post-colonial biblical criticism, by which method the analytical reader approaches a scripture from the perspective of a colonial reader. Another book in this area is Postcolonial Theory (1998), by Leela Gandhi, explains Post-colonialism in terms of how it can be applied to the wider philosophical and intellectual context of history.

=== Later works ===
Said's later works included:

- The World, the Text, and the Critic (1983)
- Nationalism, Colonialism, and Literature: Yeats and Decolonization (1988)
- Culture and Imperialism (1993)
- Representations of the Intellectual: The 1993 Reith Lectures (1994)
- Humanism and Democratic Criticism (2004)
- On Late Style (2006)

== Political activism and commentary ==
=== Palestinian advocacy and opposition to Oslo ===
In 1967, consequent to the Six-Day War, Said became a public intellectual when he acted politically to counter misrepresentations (factual, historical, cultural) with which American news media explained the Arab–Israeli conflict; alleged reportage divorced from the historical realities of the Middle East, and from Israel and the Palestinian territories. To address, explain, and correct perceived orientalism, Said published The Arab Portrayed (1968), a descriptive essay about images of "the Arab" that are meant to evade specific discussion of the historical and cultural realities of the peoples represented in the Middle East, featured in journalism (print, photograph, television) and some types of scholarship (specialist journals).

From 1977 until 1991, Said was an independent member of the Palestinian National Council (PNC). In 1988, he was a proponent of the two-state solution to the Israeli–Palestinian conflict, and voted for the establishment of the State of Palestine at a meeting of the PNC in Algiers. In 1993, Said quit his membership in the Palestinian National Council, to protest the internal politics that led to the signing of the Oslo Accords (Declaration of Principles on Interim Self-Government Arrangements, 1993), which he thought had unacceptable terms, and because the terms had been rejected by the Madrid Conference of 1991.

Said disliked the Oslo Accords for not producing an independent State of Palestine, and because they were politically inferior to a plan that Yasir Arafat had rejected—a plan Said had presented to Arafat on behalf of the US government in the late 1970s. Especially troublesome to Said was his belief that Yasir Arafat had betrayed the right of return of the Palestinian refugees to their houses and properties in the Green Line territories of pre-1967 Israel, and that Arafat ignored the growing political threat of the Israeli settlements in the occupied territories that had been established since the conquest of Palestine in 1967.

In 1995, in response to Said's political criticisms, the Palestinian Authority (PA) banned the sale of Said's books; however, the PA lifted the book ban when Said publicly praised Yasir Arafat for rejecting Prime Minister Ehud Barak's offers at the Middle East Peace Summit at Camp David (2000) in the US.

In 1998, Said made In Search of Palestine (1998), a BBC documentary film about Palestine, past and present. In the company of his son, Wadie, Said revisited the places of his boyhood, and confronted injustices meted out to ordinary Palestinians in the contemporary West Bank. Despite the social and cultural prestige afforded to BBC cinema products in the US, the documentary was never broadcast by any American television company.

=== Views on Zionism and the conflict ===
In the essay "Zionism from the Standpoint of Its Victims" (1979), Said argued in favor of the political legitimacy and philosophical authenticity of the claims and right to a Jewish homeland, while also asserting the simultaneously inherent right of national self-determination for the Palestinian people. He also characterized Israel's founding as it happened, the displacement of the Palestinian Arabs that accompanied it, and the subjugation of the Palestinians in the Israeli-occupied territories as a manifestation of Western-style imperialism. His books on this topic include The Question of Palestine (1979), The Politics of Dispossession (1994), and The End of the Peace Process (2000).

In the mid-1990s, Said wrote the foreword to the history book Jewish History, Jewish Religion: The Weight of Three Thousand Years (1994), by Israel Shahak, about Jewish fundamentalism, which presents the cultural proposition that Israel's mistreatment of the Palestinians is rooted in a Judaic requirement (of permission) for Jews to commit crimes, including murder, against Gentiles (non-Jews). In his foreword, Said said that Jewish History, Jewish Religion is "nothing less than a concise history of classic and modern Judaism, insofar as these are relevant to the understanding of modern Israel"; and praised the historian Shahak for describing contemporary Israel as a nation subsumed in a "Judeo-Nazi" cultural ambiance that allowed the dehumanization of the Palestinian Other:

In all my works, I remained fundamentally critical of a gloating and uncritical nationalism. ... My view of Palestine ... remains the same today: I expressed all sorts of reservations about the insouciant nativism, and militant militarism of the nationalist consensus; I suggested, instead, a critical look at the Arab environment, Palestinian history, and the Israeli realities, with the explicit conclusion that only a negotiated settlement, between the two communities of suffering, Arab and Jewish, would provide respite from the unending war.

During a lecture conference at the University of Washington in 2003, Said affirmed that Israeli Jews had grounds for a territorial claim to Palestine (or the Land of Israel), but maintained that it was not "the only claim or the main claim" vis-à-vis all of the other ethnic groups (including Jews and Arabs) who have inhabited the region throughout human history:

Halleran: "Professor Said, do the Zionists have any historical claim to the lands of Israel?"

Said: "Of course! But I would not say that the Jewish claim, or the Zionist claim, is the only claim or the main claim; I say that it is a claim among many others. Certainly, the Arabs have a much greater claim because they have had a longer history of inhabitance—of actual residence in Palestine—than the Jews did. If you look at the history of Palestine, there's been some quite interesting work done by biblical archaeologists... you'll see that the period of actual Israelite—as it was called in the Old Testament—dominance in Palestine amounts to about 200 to 250 years. But there were Moabites, there were Jebusites, there were Canaanites, there were Philistines, there were many other people in Palestine at the time and before and after. And to isolate one of them and say, 'That's the real owner of the land,' I mean, that is—that is fundamentalism. Because the only way you can back it up is say, 'Well, God gave it to us.' [...] So, I think the people who have a history of residence in Palestine for a certain amount of time—including Jews, yes, and, of course, the Arabs—have a claim. But... this is very important: I don't think any claim [...] nobody has a claim that overrides all the others and entitles that person with that so-called claim to drive people out!"

— "Imperial Continuity – Palestine, Iraq, and U.S. Policy" (8 May 2003)

Said's argument against the Religious Zionism traditionally espoused by Jewish fundamentalists (i.e., citing God to project the Jewish/Israeli claim as superior to the Arab/Palestinian claim) asserted that such justifications were inherently irrational because they would, among other factors, enable Christians and Muslims of all ethnic and cultural backgrounds to lay superseding territorial claims to Palestine on the basis of their faith.

=== Lebanon stone-throwing incident ===
On 3 July 2000, while traveling in Lebanon with his son, Wadie, Said was photographed throwing a stone across the Blue Line Lebanese–Israel border, the image of which elicited much political criticism about his action demonstrating an inherent, personal sympathy with terrorism; and, in Commentary magazine, the journalist Edward Alexander labelled Said as "The Professor of Terror", for aggression against Israel. Said explained the stone-throwing as a two-fold action, personal and political; a man-to-man contest-of-skill, between a father and his son, and an Arab man's gesture of joy at the end of the Israeli occupation of Southern Lebanon (1985–2000): "It was a pebble; there was nobody there. The guardhouse was at least half a mile away."

Said described the incident as trivial and said that he "threw the stone as a symbolic act" into "an empty place". The Beirut newspaper As-Safir (The Ambassador) interviewed a Lebanese local resident who said that Said was less than ten metres (ca. 30 ft.) from the Israel Defense Force (IDF) soldiers manning the two-storey guardhouse, when he threw the stone, which hit the barbed wire fence in front of the guardhouse. In the US, Said's action was criticised by some students at Columbia University and the Anti-Defamation League of B'nai B'rith International (Sons of the Covenant). The university provost, sociologist Jonathan R. Cole, published a five-page letter stating that Said's action was protected under academic freedom: "To my knowledge, the stone was directed at no-one; no law was broken; no indictment was made; no criminal or civil action has been taken against Professor Saïd."

In February 2001, the Freud Society in Austria cancelled a lecture by Said due to the stone-throwing incident. The President of the Freud Society said "[t]he majority [of the society] decided to cancel the Freud lecture to avoid an internal clash. I deeply regret that this has been done to Professor Said".

=== Criticism of US foreign policy ===
In the revised edition of Covering Islam: How the Media and the Experts Determine How We See the Rest of the World (1997), Said criticized the Orientalist bias of the Western news media's reportage about the Middle East and Islam, especially the tendency to editorialize "speculations about the latest conspiracy to blow up buildings, sabotage commercial airliners, and poison water supplies." He criticized the American military involvement in the Kosovo War (1998–99) as an imperial action; and described the Iraq Liberation Act (1998), promulgated during the Clinton administration, as the political license that predisposed the US to invade Iraq in 2003, which was authorised with the Iraq Resolution (2 October 2002); and the continual support of Israel by successive US presidential governments, as actions meant to perpetuate regional political instability in the Middle East.

In the event, despite being sick with leukemia, as a public intellectual, Said continued criticising the US invasion of Iraq in mid-2003; and, in the Egyptian Al-Ahram Weekly newspaper, in the article "Resources of Hope" (2 April 2003), Said said that the US war against Iraq was a politically ill-conceived military enterprise.

=== FBI surveillance ===
In 2003, Haidar Abdel-Shafi, Ibrahim Dakak, Mustafa Barghouti, and Said established Al-Mubadara (the Palestinian National Initiative), headed by Barghouti, a third-party reformist, democratic party meant to be an alternative to the usual two-party politics of Palestine. Its ideology is to be an alternative to the extremist politics Fatah and the Islamist Hamas. Said's founding of the group, as well as his other international political activities concerning Palestine, were noticed by the US government, and Said came under FBI surveillance, which became more intensive after 1972. David Price, an anthropologist at Evergreen State College, requested the FBI file on Said through the Freedom of Information Act on behalf of the left-wing magazine CounterPunch and published a report there on his findings. The released pages of Said's FBI files show that the FBI read Said's books and reported on their contents to Washington.

== Musical interests ==
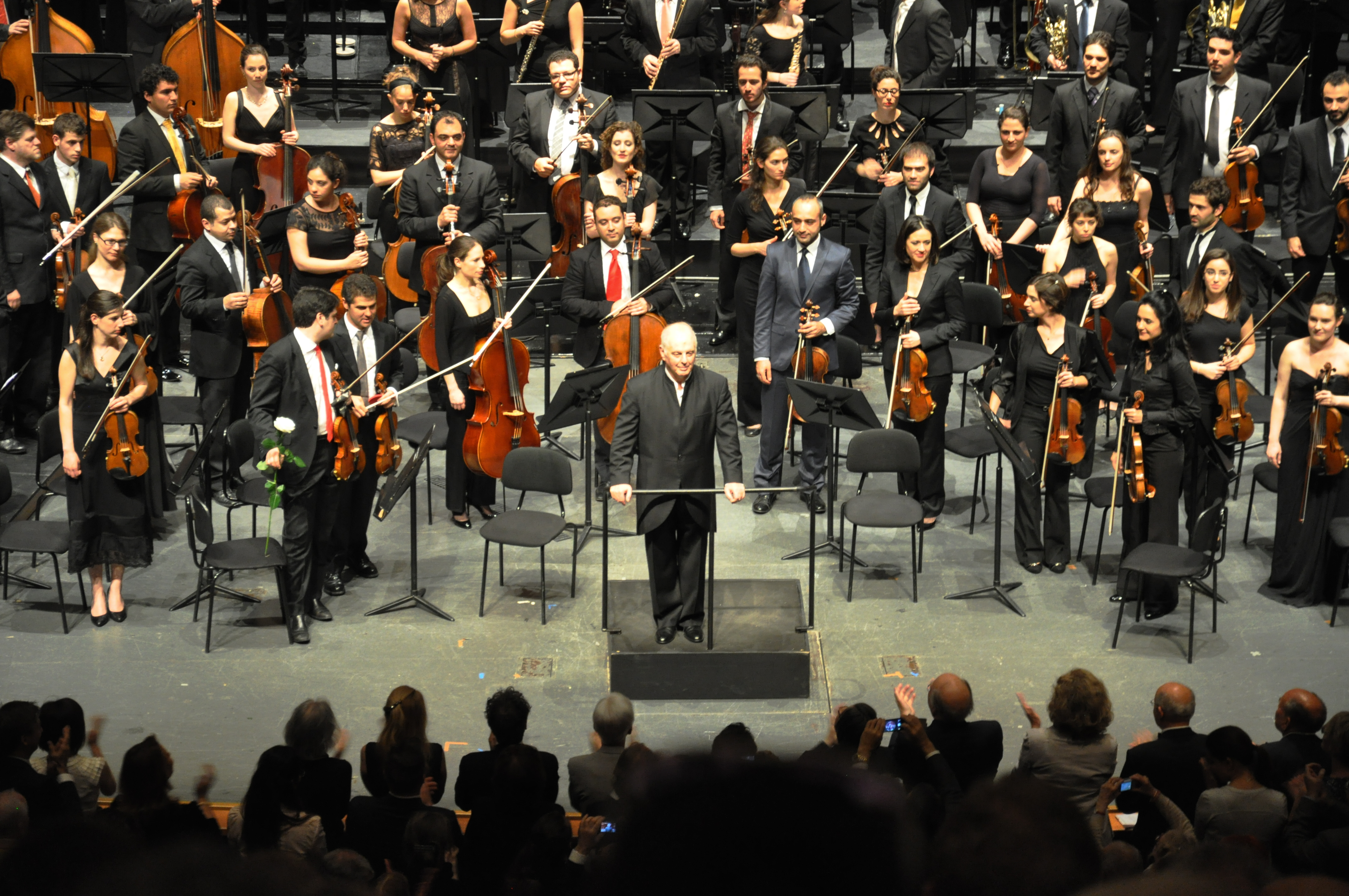
Conductor Daniel Barenboim and the West–Eastern Divan Orchestra in 2013

Besides having been a public intellectual, Edward Said was an accomplished pianist, worked as the music critic for The Nation magazine, and wrote four books about music: Musical Elaborations (1991); Parallels and Paradoxes: Explorations in Music and Society (2002), with Daniel Barenboim as co-author; On Late Style: Music and Literature Against the Grain (2006); and Music at the Limits (2007) in which final book he spoke of finding musical reflections of his literary and historical ideas in bold compositions and strong performances.

Elsewhere in the musical world, the composer Mohammed Fairouz acknowledged the deep influence of Edward Said upon his works; compositionally, Fairouz's First Symphony thematically alludes to the essay "Homage to a Belly-Dancer" (1990), about Tahia Carioca, the Egyptian dancer, actress, and political militant; and a piano sonata, titled Reflections on Exile (1984), which thematically refers to the emotions inherent to being an exile.

=== West–Eastern Divan Orchestra ===
In 1999, Said and Barenboim co-founded the West-Eastern Divan Orchestra, composed of young Israeli, Palestinian, and Arab musicians. They also established The Barenboim–Said Foundation in Seville, to develop education-through-music projects. Besides managing the West–Eastern Divan Orchestra, the Barenboim–Said Foundation assists with the administration of the Academy of Orchestral Studies, the Musical Education in Palestine Project, and the Early Childhood Musical Education Project, in Seville.

== Honors and awards ==
Besides honors, memberships, and postings to prestigious organizations worldwide, Edward Said was awarded some twenty honorary university degrees in the course of his professional life as an academic, critic, and Man of Letters. Among the honors bestowed to him were:

- the Bowdoin Prize by Harvard University.
- He twice received the Lionel Trilling Book Award; the first occasion was the inaugural bestowing of said literary award in 1976, for Beginnings: Intention and Method (1974). He also received the
- Wellek Prize of the American Comparative Literature Association
- The inaugural Spinoza Lens Prize.
- Lannan Literary Award for Lifetime Achievement in 2001
- Prince of Asturias Award for Concord in 2002 (shared with Daniel Barenboim).
- First US citizen to receive the Sultan Owais Prize (for Cultural & Scientific Achievements, 1996–1997).
- The autobiography Out of Place (1999) was bestowed three awards, the 1999 New Yorker Book Award for Non-Fiction; the 2000 Anisfield-Wolf Book Award for Non-Fiction; and the Morton Dauwen Zabel Award in Literature.

== Death and legacy ==
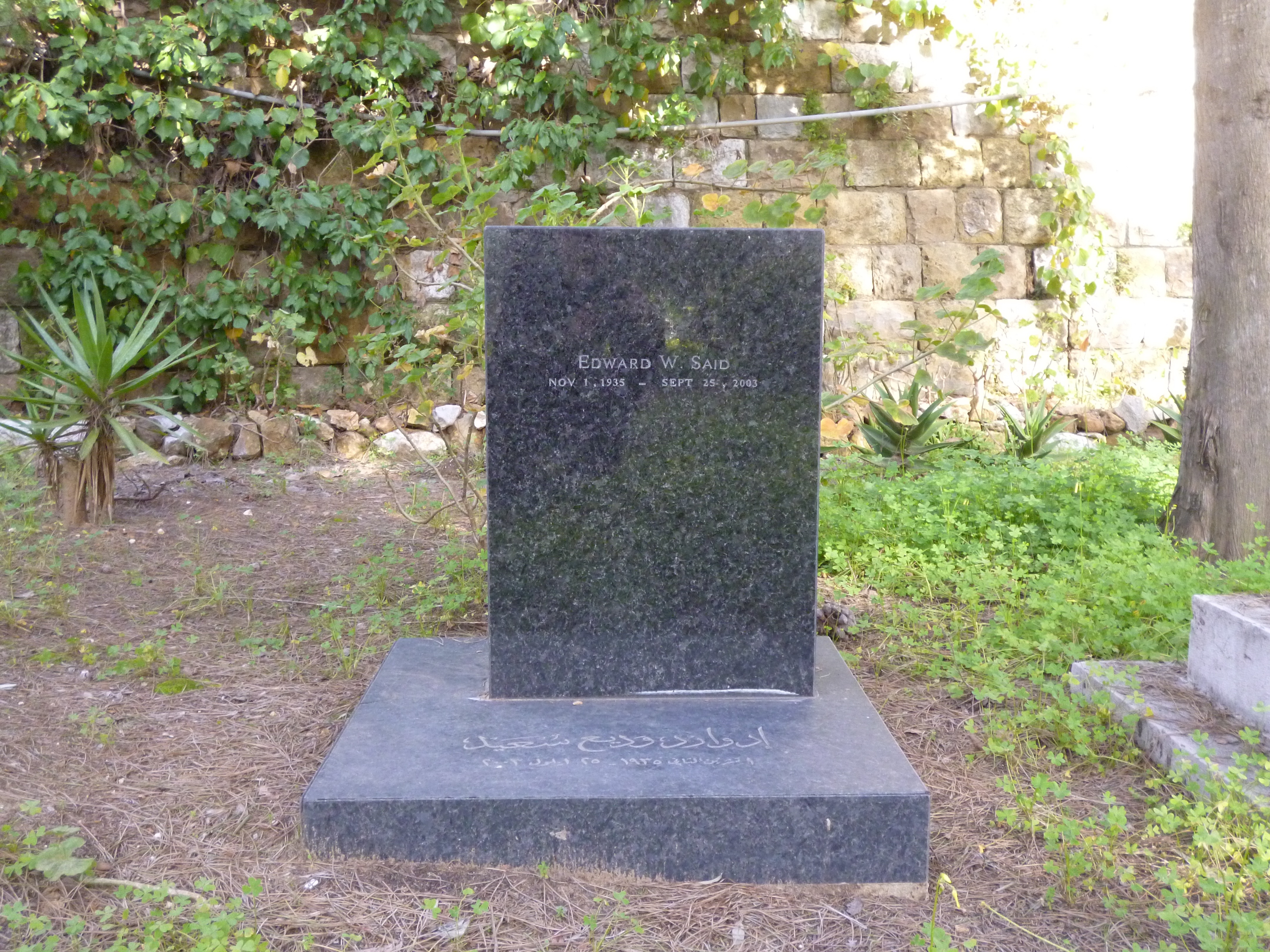
Edward Said's gravestone

Said died at the age of 67 in New York City on 24 September 2003, after a 12-year struggle with chronic lymphocytic leukemia. He was survived by his wife, Mariam C. Said, his son, Wadie Said, and his daughter, Najla Said. The eulogists included Alexander Cockburn ("A Mighty and Passionate Heart"); Seamus Deane ("A Late Style of Humanism"); Christopher Hitchens ("A Valediction for Edward Said"); Tony Judt ("The Rootless Cosmopolitan"); Michael Wood ("On Edward Said"); and Tariq Ali ("Remembering Edward Said, 1935–2003"). Said is buried in the Protestant Cemetery in Broumana, Jabal Lubnan, Lebanon. His headstone indicates he died on 25 September 2003.

The tributes to Said include books and schools. The books include Waiting for the Barbarians: A Tribute to Edward W. Said (2008) that features essays by Akeel Bilgrami, Rashid Khalidi, and Elias Khoury; Edward Said: The Charisma of Criticism (2010), by Harold Aram Veeser, a critical biography; and Edward Said: A Legacy of Emancipation and Representations (2010), with essays by Joseph Massad, Ilan Pappé, Ella Shohat, Ghada Karmi, Noam Chomsky, Gayatri Chakravorty Spivak, and Daniel Barenboim.

In 2002, Sheikh Zayed bin Sultan Al Nayhan, the founder and president of the United Arab Emirates, and others endowed the Edward Said Chair at Columbia University; it was filled by Rashid Khalidi from 2003 until his retirement in 2024.

In November 2004, in Palestine, Birzeit University renamed their music school the Edward Said National Conservatory of Music.

The Barenboim–Said Academy (Berlin) was established in 2012.

In 2016, California State University, Fresno started examining applicants for a newly created Professorship in Middle East Studies named after Edward Said, but after months of examining applicants, Fresno State canceled the search. Some observers claim that the cancellation was due to pressure from pro-Israeli individuals and groups.

On September 12th, 2026, a documentary film revolving around Said, Edward Said: Between Worlds directed by Maiken Baird, with Alex Gibney serving as executive producer, and Said's daughter, Najla serving as a consulting producer, premiered at the 2026 Toronto International Film Festival.
