= Arab Jews =

Term for Jews originating from the Arab world

Arab Jews (Arabic: اليهود العرب al-Yahūd al-ʿArab; Hebrew: יהודים ערבים Yehudim `Aravim) is a term for Jews living in or originating from the Arab world. Many left or were expelled from Arab countries in the decades following the founding of Israel in 1948, and took up residence in Israel, Western Europe, the United States and Latin America and remained minority exists. The term is controversial and politically contested in the diaspora and Israel, where the term "Mizrahi Jews" was adopted by the early state instead. However, a minority of anti-Zionist Jews of Middle Eastern and North African origin actively elect to call themselves "Arab Jews". However, many Jews living in Arab lands have historically not identified themselves as Arabs or Arab Jews, and many would take offense at being labeled as such. Jews living under Muslim rule were both viewed as, and understood themselves to be, a distinct group.

Jews living in Arab-majority countries historically mostly used various Judeo-Arabic dialects as their primary community language, with Hebrew used for liturgical and cultural purposes (literature, philosophy, poetry, etc.). Many aspects of their culture (music, clothes, food, architecture of synagogues and houses, etc.) have commonality with local non-Jewish Arab populations, while also reflecting a distinct diasporic Jewish identity (Cuisine, languages etc.) They usually follow Sephardi Jewish liturgy, and are (counting their descendants) by far the largest portion of Mizrahi Jews.

Though Golda Meir, in an interview as late as 1972 with Oriana Fallaci, referred to Jews from Arab countries as "Arab Jews", the use of the term is controversial, as the vast majority of Jews with origins in Arab-majority countries do not identify as Arabs, and most Jews who lived amongst Arabs did not call themselves "Arab Jews" or view themselves as such. A closely related, but older term denoting Arabic-speaking Jews is Musta'arabi Jews.

The term can also sometimes refer to Jewish converts of Arab birth, such as Baruch Mizrahi or Nasrin Kadri, or people of mixed Jewish-Arab parentage, such as Lucy Ayoub.

== Terminology ==
The Arabic al-Yahūd al-ʿArab and Hebrew Yehudim `Aravim literally mean 'Arab Jews', a phrasing that in current usage is considered derogatory by Israelis of Mizrahi and Sephardic origin. It is to be distinguished from a similar term that circulated in Palestine in late Ottoman times, when Arab Palestinians referred to their Jewish compatriots as 'Arab-born Jews' (Yahud awlad ʿArab), which can also be translated as 'Arab Jews'.

Historian Emily Benichou Gottreich has observed that the term 'Arab Jew' is largely an identity of exile and “was originally theorized from within frameworks of, and remains especially prominent in, specific academic fields, namely literary and cultural studies”. Gottreich has also noted that the term "implies a particular politics of knowledge vis-à-vis the Israeli-Palestinian conflict and larger Zionist narrative(s)" and post-Zionist discourse. However, she argues that the discourse about Arab Jews remains largely "limited to the semantic-epistemological level, resulting in a flattened identity that is both historically and geographically ambiguous".

Prior to the creation of the State of Israel, between 700,000 and 850,000 Jews lived in the Middle East and North Africa, but by the end of the 20th century, all of these communities had faced "dislocation and dispersal" and largely vanished, according to Lital Levy, who has noted: "These were indigenous communities (in some cases present in the area for millennia) whose unique, syncretic cultures have since been expunged as a result of emigration." In Israel, these communities were subject to "deracination and resocialization", while in the West, the concept of Jews from the Arab World was, and remains, poorly understood.

From a cultural perspective, the disappearance of the Jewish dialects of spoken Arabic, written Judeo-Arabic and the last generation of Jewish writers of literary Arabic "all silently sounded the death knell of a certain world", according to Levy, or what Shelomo Dov Goitein dubbed the "Jewish-Arab symbiosis" in his work Jews and Arabs, and which Ammiel Alcalay sought to recapture in her 1993 work After Jews and Arabs.

According to Shenhav and Hever, the term "Arab Jews" was “widely used in the past to depict Jews living in Arab countries, but was extirpated from the political lexicon upon their arrival in Israel in the 1950s and 1960s.” The discourse then underwent a demise before its “political reawakening in the 1990s”. Nevertheless, "very few Jews of Arab descent, in Israel, would label themselves 'Arab Jews'" due to it being a "marker of a cultural and political avant-garde."

Gottreich has labelled the recent work on the subject by Ella Habiba Shohat as particularly pioneering, while also pointing to the significant contributions made by Gil Hochberg, Gil Anidjar and Sami Shalom Chetrit. Other notable writers on the subject include Naeim Giladi and David Rabeeya.

Until the middle of the 20th century, Judeo-Arabic was commonly spoken. After arriving in Israel the Jews from Arab lands found that use of Judeo-Arabic was discouraged and its usage fell into disrepair. The population of Jews in Arab countries would decrease dramatically. Even those who remained in the Arab world tended to abandon Judeo-Arabic. Amnon Raz-Krakotzkin argues that Jews from Arab lands were Arab in that they identified with Arab culture even if they did not identity as Arab Jews or with Arab nationalism.

== Political history ==
The terminology of Arab Jewishness held notable prevalence in the 19th century, when Jews living in Arab countries identified with the Arab national movement that emerged in the lead up to the dismantlement of the Ottoman Empire – as early as the Ottoman administrative reforms of 1839 – owing to shared language and culture with their Muslim and Christian compatriots in Ottoman Syria, Iraq, and Egypt.

The terminology became politically important during the First World War, when Jews of Middle Eastern origin living in Western countries used the term to support their case that they were not Turks and should not be treated as enemy aliens.

In recent decades, some Jews have self-identified as Arab Jews, such as Ella Shohat, who uses the term in contrast to the Zionist establishment's categorization of Jews as either Ashkenazim or Mizrahim; the latter, she believes, have been oppressed as the Arabs have. Other Jews, such as Albert Memmi, say that Jews in Arab countries would have liked to be Arab Jews, but centuries of abuse by Arab Muslims prevented it, and now it's too late. The term is often used by post-Zionists and Arab nationalists.

Today, there is widespread rejection of the term within the Jewish community, with many considering it an affront to their identity. In 2015, the question was posed as to the validity of the term versus alternatives, such as "Iraqi Israeli", in the context of Arab Jews from Iraq, or Mizrahi Jew.

Today, some left-wing Israeli political activists identify themselves as Arab Jews, including Naeim Giladi, Ella Habiba Shohat, Sami Shalom Chetrit and David Rabeeya.

=== In post-Zionism ===
The term Arab Jews has become part of the language of post-Zionism. The term was introduced by Ella Shohat. Ella Shohat argues Zionist historiography could not accept a hyphenated Arab-Jewish identity and embarked on a program to remove the Arabness and Orientalness of the Jews from the Arab world after they arrived in Israel. To insure homogeneity Zionist focused on religious commonality and a romanticized past. She argues that the use of the term Mizrahim is in some sense a Zionist achievement in that it created a single unitary identity separated from the Islamic world. Which replaced older multifaceted identities each linked to the Islamic world, including but not limited to identifying as Arab Jews. She argues that when Sephardi express hostility towards Arabs it is often due to self-hatred. Another argument that Shohat makes is that Israel is already demographically an Arab country.

Yehouda Shenhav's works are also considered to be among the seminal works of post-Zionism. Shenhav, an Israeli sociologist, traced the origins of the conceptualization of the Mizrahi Jews as Arab Jews. He interprets Zionism as an ideological practice with three simultaneous and symbiotic categories: "Nationality", "Religion" and "Ethnicity". In order to be included in the national collective they had to be "de-Arabized". According to Shenhav, Religion distinguished between Arabs and Arab Jews, thus marking nationality among the Arab Jews.

David Rabeeya argues that while the Zionist movement succeed in creating a Jewish state it did irreparable harm to Arab Jews and Palestinians. He argues that Israel has already entered a post-Zionist era in which the influence of Zionist Ashkenazim has declined. With many Jews of European origin choosing to leave the country as Israel becomes less Western. He also self-identified as an Arab Jew, extends that identification back even further, noting the long history of Arab Jews in the Arab world that remained in place after the dawn of Islam in the 7th century until midway through the 20th century. He writes that Arab Jews, like Arab Muslims and Arab Christians, were culturally Arab with religious commitments to Judaism. He notes that Arab Jews named their progeny with Arabic names and "Like every Arab, Arab Jews were proud of their Arabic language and its dialects, and held a deep emotional attachment to its beauty and richness."

David Tal argues that Shohat and her students faced great resistance from Mizrahim with few choosing to identify as Arab Jews. He argues that Shohat in a sense tried to impose an identity in the same way in which she criticized Ashkenazi jews for doing.

Lital Levy argues that post-Zionism did more than revive the concept of the Arab Jew. Instead it created something new in so far as it is questionable that a pristine Arab Jew identity which could be reclaimed ever existed. Levy suggests that the contemporary intellectuals who declare themselves to be Arab Jews are similar to Jewish intellectuals who between the late 1920s and 1940s did likewise; in both cases these intellectuals were small in number and outside the mainstream of the Jewish community. Likewise in both cases the term was used for political purposes. A view shared by Emily Benichou Gottreich who argues that the term was used to push back against both Zionism and Arab nationalism which tended to view the categories of Jews and Arabs as mutually exclusive and as a way to show solidarity with the Palestinians.

== Criticism ==
A common criticism of the term "Arab Jews", particularly among Jewish communities originating from Arab lands, is that Jews constitute a diaspora and ethnic group, which the term muddies. Ca' Foscari University of Venice Lecturer Dario Miccoli states that he does not use the term, seeing it as an anachronism. Princeton professor Jonathan Marc Gribetz cautions against the uncritical use of term in historiographical works, viewing it as non-typical.

In 2019, a coalition of Mizrahi and Sephardic organizations issued a statement condemning statements of Jewish voice for Peace (a group which has been using the term) appropriation and distortion of Middle Eastern and North African Jewish history, accusing the group of seeking to deny Jewish indigenous origins and tokenize them for political reasons.

Scholar Edith Haddad Shaked has criticized the concept of the Arab Jew, arguing that there are Arab Muslims and Arab Christians, but there was not such a thing as an Arab Jew or a Jewish Arab, when the Jews lived among the Arabs. She has noted how Tunisia born historian, Professor Paul Sebag, stated that "these terms were never used in Tunisia, and they do not correspond/coincident to the religious and socio-historical context/reality of the Jews in Tunisia/the Arab world."

In North Africa, she has argued, "Jews were always considered members of a socio-religious community minority, different and distinct from the Arab population, because of their Jewish cultural tradition, their common past, and the Judeo-arabic language—all of them separated them from the Arabs. And the Arabs saw the Jews, even the ones who spoke only Judeo-Arabic, as members of a socio-linguistic religious cultural community, different from theirs.

In 1975, Albert Memmi wrote: "The term 'Arab Jews' is obviously not a good one. I have adopted it for convenience. I simply wish to underline that as natives of those countries called Arab and indigenous to those lands well before the arrival of the Arabs, we shared with them, to a great extent, languages, traditions and cultures ... We would have liked to be Arab Jews. If we abandoned the idea, it is because over the centuries the Moslem Arabs systematically prevented its realization by their contempt and cruelty. It is now too late for us to become Arab Jews."

Others argue that in recent years, there has been a concerted effort by anti-Zionist groups to reinterpret Mizrahi Jewish history in ways that disconnect these communities from their identity, culture, and ancestral homeland. They argue that Anti-Zionist voices show limited engagement with Mizrahi experiences and have promoted the narrative of “Arab Jews” to serve their political agenda.

Proponents of the argument against "Arab Jews" include most Jews from Arab lands.

== Arab Jews in Israel/Palestine ==
Prior to the modern Zionist movement, Jewish communities existed in the southern Levant that are now known as the Old Yishuv. The Old Yishuv was composed of three clusters: Ladino-speaking Sephardi Iberian emigrants to the late Mamluk Sultanate and early Ottoman Empire following the Spanish Inquisition; Eastern European Hasidic Jews who emigrated to Ottoman Palestine during the 18th and 19th centuries; and Judeo-Arabic-speaking Musta'arabi Jews who had been living in Palestine since the destruction of the Second Temple and who had become culturally and linguistically Arabized. In the 20th century, as the society got polarised and the conflict intensified, the Musta'arabim were forced to choose sides, with some embracing the nascent Zionist movement and others embracing the Arab nationalist or Palestinian nationalist causes. Other Arab Jews left the Ottoman Empire entirely, joining Syrian-Jewish/Palestinian-Jewish emigrants to the United States. The descendants of the Palestinian Musta'arabim live in Israel, but have largely assimilated into the Sephardi community over time.

== Arab-Jewish diaspora ==
=== Argentina ===
Arab Jews were part of the Arab migration to Argentina and played a part as a link between the Arab and Jewish communities of Argentina. Many of the Arab Jews in Argentina were from Syria and Lebanon. According to Ignacio Klich, an Argentine scholar of Arab and Jewish immigration, "Arabic-speaking Jews felt themselves to have a lot in common with those sharing the same place of birth and culture, not less than what bound them to the Yiddish-speakers praying to the same deity."

=== France ===
France is home to a large population of Arab Jews, predominantly with roots in Algeria.

=== United Kingdom ===
According to the 2011 United Kingdom census, 0.25% of Arabs in England and Wales and 0.05% of Arabs in Scotland identified their religion as Judaism.

=== United States ===
Many Arab-Jewish immigrants have settled in New York City and formed a Sephardi community. The community is centered in Brooklyn and is primarily composed of Syrian Jews. Other Arab Jews in New York City hail from Egypt, Israel, Lebanon, and Morocco. Arab Jews first began arriving in New York City in large numbers between 1880 and 1924. Most Arab immigrants during these years were Christian, while Arab Jews were a minority and Arab Muslims largely began migrating during the mid-1960s. When Syrian Jews first began to arrive in New York City during the late 1800s and early 1900s, Eastern European Ashkenazi Jews on the Lower East Side sometimes disdained their Syrian co-coreligionists as Arabische Yidden, Yiddish for "Arab Jews". Some Ashkenazim doubted whether Sephardi/Mizrahi Jews from the Middle East were Jewish at all. In response, some Syrian Jews who were deeply proud of their ancient Jewish heritage, derogatorily dubbed Ashkenazi Jews as "J-Dubs", a reference to the first and third letters of the English word "Jew". In the 1990 United States Census, there were 11,610 Arab Jews in New York City, comprising 23 percent of the total Arab population of the city. Arab Jews in the city sometimes still face anti-Arab racism. After the September 11 attacks, some Arab Jews in New York City were subjected to arrest and detention because they were suspected to be Islamist terrorists.

== Notable Arab Jews ==
- Isaac Mizrahi, American fashion designer and actor
- Ariella Azoulay, author, filmmaker
- Ella Shohat
- Joseph Nakash, American businessman
- Sasson Somekh, professor at Tel Aviv University
- André Azoulay, adviser to Moroccan King Mohammed VI.
- Avi Shlaim, Israeli-British historian.
- Ammiel Alcalay, academic
- Ilan Halevi
- Rachel Shabi, journalist and author

== See also ==
- Arabization
- Canaanism
- Pan-Semitism
- History of the Jews under Muslim rule
- Jewish diaspora
- Jewish ethnic divisions
- Jewish tribes of Arabia
- Judeo-Arabic
- Mizrahi Jews
- Mozarabs
- Musta'arabi Jews
- Syrian Jews
- Palestinian Jews
- Yemenite Jews
- Gerim
