= Historical tiger hunts in Azerbaijan =

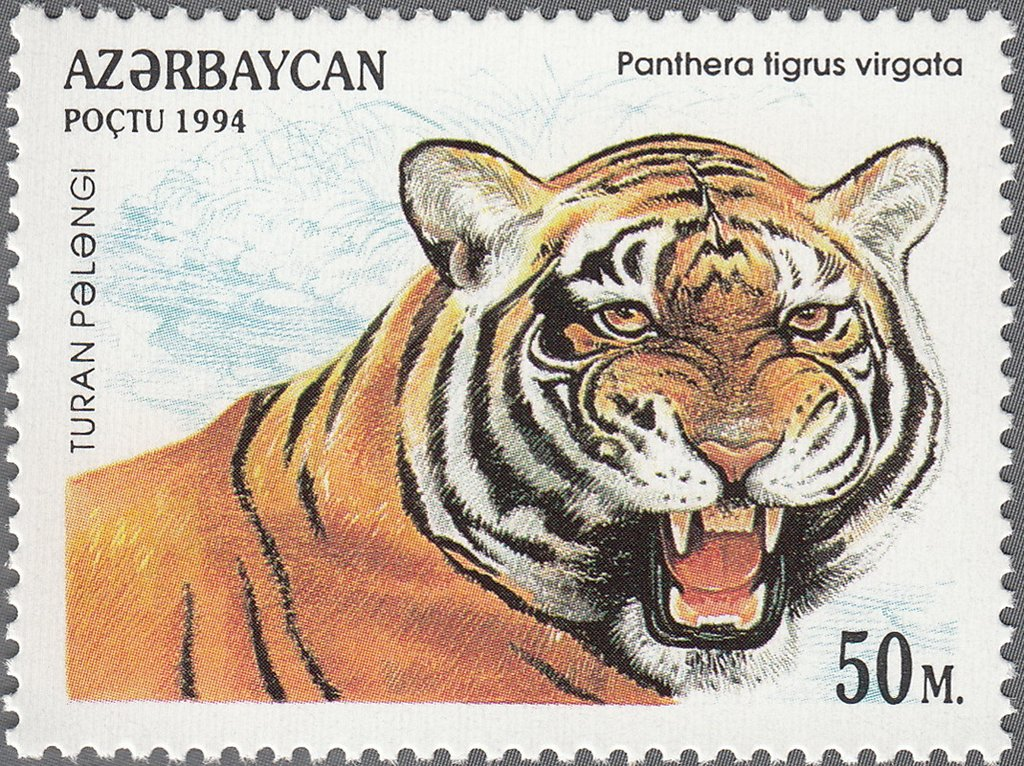
Azerbaijani postage stamp depicting the Turanian tiger

Historical tiger hunts in Azerbaijan refer to the practice of hunting the now-extinct Caspian (Turanian) tiger, which once inhabited parts of southern Azerbaijan from the 18th to the early 20th centuries. Accounts of these hunts were preserved in oral traditions and historical newspapers and were often conducted by local villagers, nobles, and later by Russian officials during the Tsarist era.

== History ==
Throughout antiquity, Caspian tigers were captured for use in gladiatorial games of the Roman Empire, which contributed to their decline in Anatolia and the Caucasus. Hunting continued for centuries, and during the Soviet period, tiger hunters in several republics received state rewards until the 1930s.

Tiger hunting in Azerbaijan took place over an extended period. An 1846 issue of the Qafqaz newspaper (No. 13) mentions hunts in the Talish forests. It noted that tigers in this area often lived in family groups, typically consisting of a male, a female, and their cubs.

One remarkable account tells of a woman who killed a tiger with an axe to rescue her husband. After striking the animal, she was attacked and severely wounded, but the tiger eventually died from its injuries. The woman later claimed the tiger had mistaken her for livestock.

The same event is also described in Alexandre Dumas’s Journey to the Caucasus, which reports that she was invited to Tbilisi by Prince Vorontsov and awarded a medal for bravery. According to both the Qafqaz newspaper and Dumas’s narrative, the event took place near Göytəpə, Privolnoye (Jalilabad) or Jangamiran (Lerik). Although Dumas met the woman personally, the Qafqaz newspaper’s mention of Göytəpə as the site of the first report makes that location the most probable. The story appears to have spread among local communities and evolved over time.

Dumas also recounts encounters between merchants and a tiger on the Lankaran–Astara road, as well as a case where a tiger reportedly played with a boy from Shanaka village for several minutes without harming him.

In the Talish forests, tigers were usually hunted in groups, while individual hunts were rare. A common method involved part of the group driving the tiger toward a tree line to limit its movement, while others attacked from the front.

Between 1832 and 1932, numerous tiger-related incidents were recorded in the Talish region, Lankaran, Göytəpə, Bilasuvar, the Mugan plain, and Veng village in Karabakh. In the mid-19th century, 10–20 Turanian tigers were reportedly hunted each year around Lankaran.

In 1837, the pelt of a tiger hunted in the Talish region was presented to the St. Petersburg Academy. At an unspecified date, a tiger skull was gifted to the Caucasus Museum. In 1844, Qafqaz reported a tiger hunt organized by Russian border officers and about 200 local residents near Göytəpə. In 1896, a Russian lieutenant killed two tigers with local hunters in the Talish region. The last documented Caspian tiger hunt in Azerbaijan occurred in 1932 near Göytəpə, when both a male and a female tiger were killed.

Historical records indicate that the most suitable tiger habitats in the Caucasus were concentrated in southeastern Azerbaijan, especially in the Talish region around Göytəpə and adjacent forests. Occasionally, tigers followed river systems into other parts of the Caucasus; for example, tigers reported in Karabakh (1846) and near Tiflis (1922) likely arrived via the Aras and Kura valleys.

== In literature ==
In 1912, Abdulla Shaig published the short story Tiger Hunting in the textbook Gulzar, part of his collection Koch. The story tells of a tiger that appeared in the forests of Borchaly.
