= Gerim =

Converts to Judaism

Gerim (Hebrew: גֵּרִים, romanized: gērîm, "converts", singular masculine: גֵּר gēr, singular feminine: גִּיּוֹרֶת gîyyoret), also known as gere ṣedeq (גְּרֵי צֶדֶק, "righteous proselytes") are former gentiles (non-Jews) who have converted to Judaism and joined the Jewish people.

A ger is recognized as having always borne a Jewish soul upon successfully completing their conversion, a process called גִּיּוּר ("giur") or גֵּרוּת ("geirut") in Hebrew. They are to be perceived halachically indistinguishable from Jews-from-birth, and generally adopt the minhag and nusach of the community amongst which they convert, but are free to adopt one according to preference.

There is a distinction between a "ger tzedek" (גר צדק) and a "ger toshav" (גר תושב), who is a "resident alien" and is bound only to the Seven Laws of Noah.

== Overview ==
Being Jewish contains both national and religious elements. The ethnoreligion of Judaism does not actively seek converts, though it does welcome sincere prospects. According to an ancient tradition, to test the sincerity of an individual beginning the process, a rabbi should discourage their conversion three times. Some communities have seen bans on performing conversions. Even once the conversion process has begun, an individual is not guaranteed to be converted if they do not meet the expectations and requirements of their sponsoring rabbi and Jewish court. Reasons for denial include a lack of sincerity, mental or physical illness, or living in a place where adhering to Jewish law is impossible. Once a halakhically valid conversion is completed, it can never be undone and the ger is forever considered to be Jewish, even if their observance wavers or they attempt to convert to another religion. However, some rabbis have ruled that revocation of a conversion is permissible if it is proven the process was not done in accordance with Jewish law or that the convert was insincere in their intentions and beliefs.

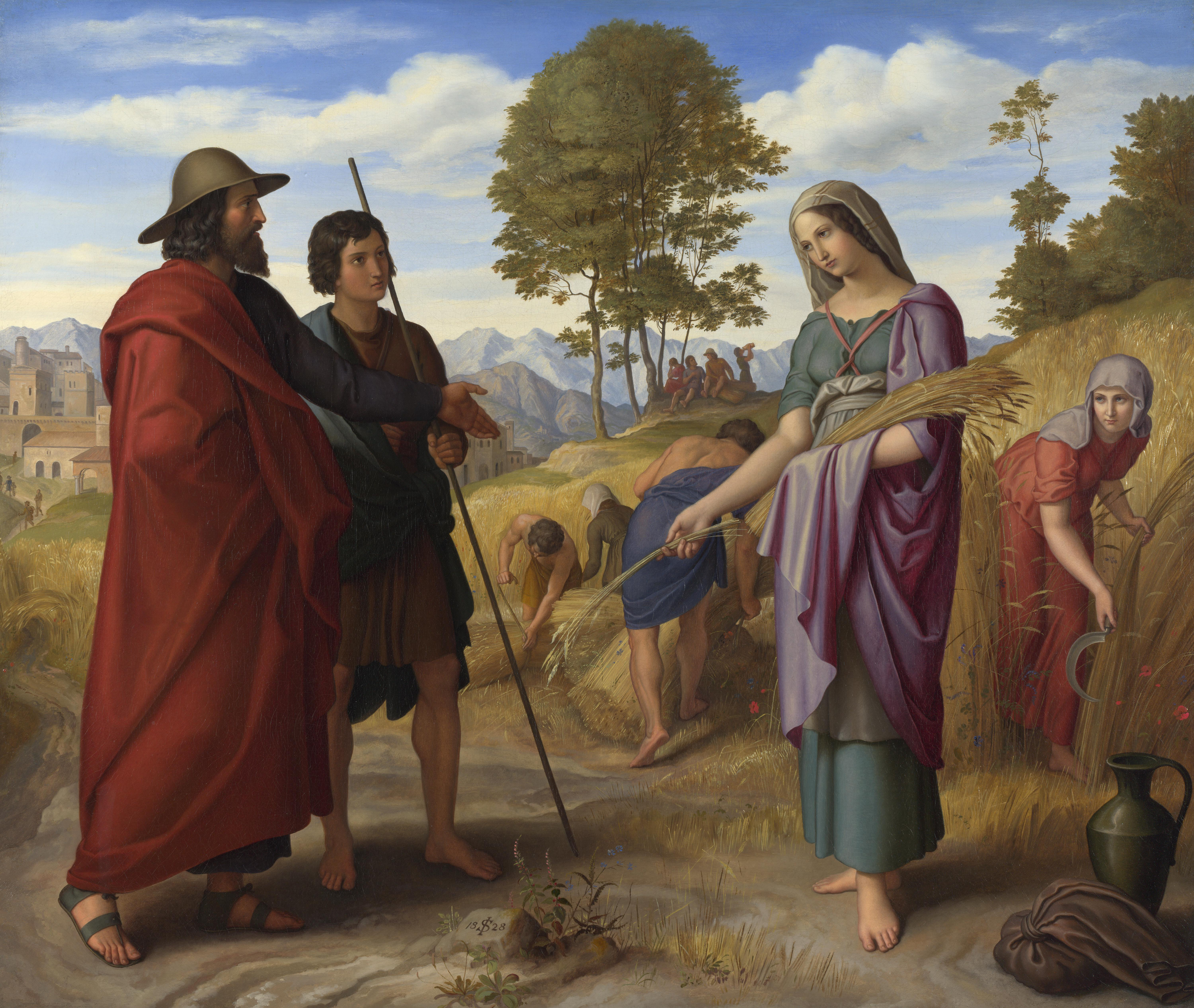
The story of Ruth is an early example of conversion in ancient Israel

The process in which a gentile (non-Jew) becomes a Jew resembles both naturalization, as well as religious conversion. The convert accepts upon themselves the laws, culture, history, and identity of the Jewish people. As such, there is no way to become a Jew without going through a recognized Jewish court. Following the completion of the process, the convert is given several documents which validate the completion of their giyyur (conversion).

Unlike converts to Christianity and Islam, Jewish converts are not only considered believers in Judaism, but rather full-fledged members of the Jewish people. This is because rather than existing only as a belief system as Christianity and Islam do, Judaism exists as an ethnic identity in addition to being a religion. Due to this, some prominent rabbis, such as Rabbi Shlomo Goren, have taken the stance that religious belief and observance is not the sole determining factor in becoming a member. However, others, such as Rabbi Saadia Gaon, held that “our nation is a nation only by virtue of its religious laws”, indicating that religious belief is a core element of the Jewish nation.

Nathan Lopes Cardozo, a Dutch-Israeli rabbi and ger tzedek stated, regarding conversion, that:

A Gentile who converts to Judaism miraculously becomes part of the people of Israel. Unlike with Christianity, this does not just mean that the Gentile now shares the beliefs of Judaism, but rather that he or she literally becomes the seed of the Avot ["forefathers"] and Imahot ["foremothers"]. For this to happen, a quasi-biological miracle is required. The Gentile needs to be reborn as a direct descendant of Avraham and Sara.

While most Ashkenazi, Sephardic, and Mizrahi Jews have genetic ancestry originating mostly in the Bronze Age Levant, individuals from a vast array of ethnic and religious backgrounds have become Jewish throughout history, leading to a minor degree of genetic and racial diversity among the Jewish population as a whole. Regardless, Jewish law places no value in genetics or physical attributes in determining whether or not an individual is or is not a Jew.

== History ==
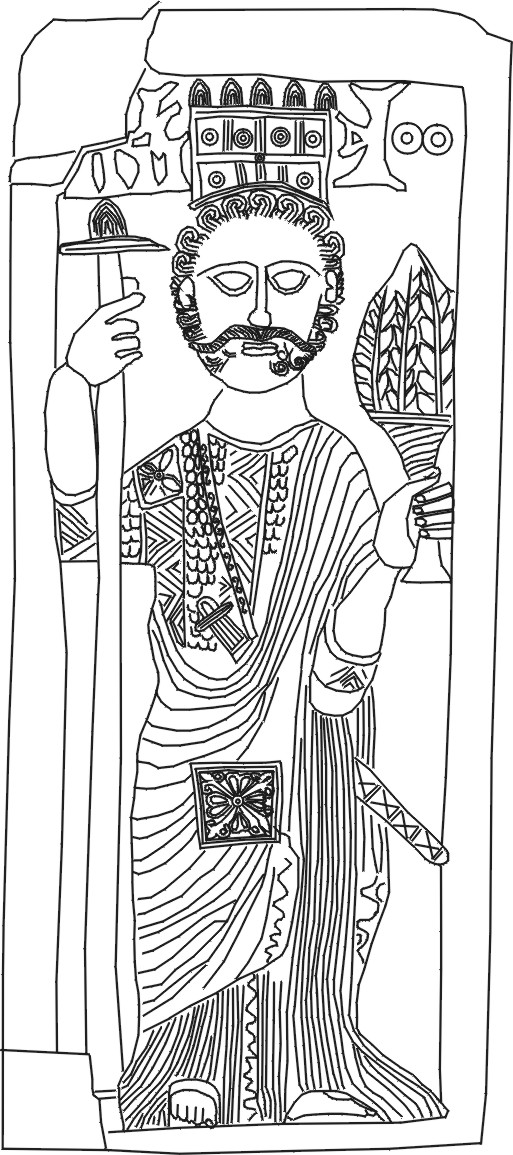
Depiction of King Dhu Nuwas, an Arab convert to Judaism.

Non-Jews have been joining the Jewish people for thousands of years, with one of the earliest instances being Ruth, a Moabite ancestor of King David. In the Book of Ruth, she declared her loyalty to the Jewish people to Naomi, her mother-in-law, by saying:

Entreat me not to leave thee, and to return from following after thee; for whither thou goest, I will go; and where thou lodgest, I will lodge; thy people shall be my people, and thy God my God; where thou diest will I die, and there will I be buried; the Lord do so to me, and more also, if aught but death part thee and me.

During the Roman era, it is estimated up to 10% (2-7 million) of the Roman population was Jewish, partially due to an increase in Jewish conversion. Several gerim and descendants of gerim, such as Simon bar Giora, Avtalyon, Shmaya, Onkelos, Queen Helena of Adiabene, Ben Bag Bag, and Rabbi Yochanan ben Torta were prominent in the ancient Jewish community.

It is estimated that a significant portion of the genome of diaspora Jewish groups is of non-Israelite genetic descent, indicating that these communities accepted in many converts following the expulsion of Jews from Israel by the Romans. These converts were fully assimilated into the Jewish people, adopting all aspects of Jewish culture and identity.

Though extremely uncommon, entire people groups have converted to Judaism throughout history, notably the Subbotnik Jews, Bene Menashe, Jews of San Nicandro, and the Himyarite Kingdom. Many of these groups have gone on to intermarry with the predominately Israelite-descended Jewish community.

=== Alleged forced conversion of the Edomites ===
The only recorded case of alleged forced conversion to Judaism was John Hyrcanus' forced conversion of the Edomites during the Maccabean Revolt against the Seleucid Empire. However, some scholars believe this conversion to have been voluntary.

== Identity ==
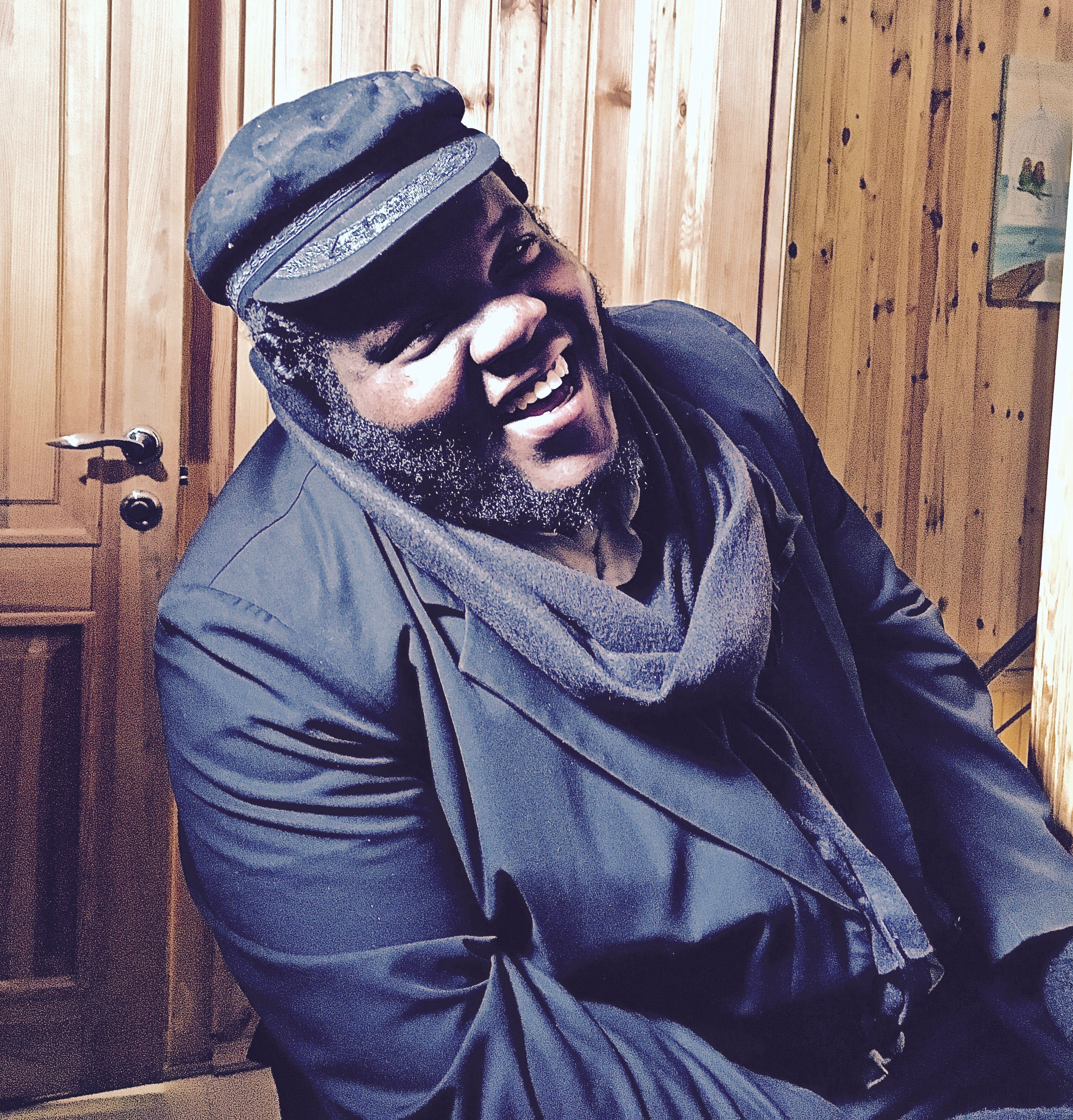
R' Nissim Black, an American convert to Judaism

=== Conversion process ===
Prospective Jewish converts must undergo a rigorous process which bears similarity to both naturalization and a religious conversion. Traditionally, this involves moving into a Jewish community, a year or more of Jewish education under a rabbi, meeting with a recognized beit din (Jewish court), and going through with the final rituals (which differ between males and females slightly).

Other requirements generally include forming bonds within the Jewish community, learning Hebrew, demonstrating ethical behavior, involvement in Jewish communal life, and maintaining a positive relationship with their sponsoring rabbi.

Married couples must convert together and commit to sending their children to 12 years of Jewish schooling.

=== Adoption of minhag (customs) ===
Converts generally are advised to adopt the minhagim (such as Ashkenazi or Sephardi) of their sponsoring rabbi or community, however many also choose their own minhag independently.

=== Opposition ===
Throughout history, there have always been Jewish figures who opposed conversion and converts for a variety of reasons. As Jewish conversion is not a right, but rather a privilege, arguments against conversion range in reasoning from the possibilities of watering down traditional Judaism to issues regarding the absorption of newcomers into an identity and culture entirely foreign to them. Other arguments cite convert's potential zealotry when observing mitzvot (commandments), thus creating an atmosphere of denigration towards born-Jews who aren't as stringent.

=== Validity of non-halakhic conversions ===
Several Jewish religious movements which do not consider Jewish law to be divinely authored, binding, and/or unchanging, such as the Reform, Reconstructionist, Conservative, and Humanistic movements, have their own respective conversion processes which are not recognized as valid by traditional, Orthodox Jews and many secular Israeli Jews due to their lack of adherence to Jewish law. However, due to the Orthodox and Conservative movements gradually splitting in the 20th century, some Orthodox authorities will consider Conservative conversions done during a specific timeframe and with a specific beit din to be halakhic (valid). However, modern Conservative conversions are not generally accepted by Orthodox Jews.

Paula Ben-Gurion, wife of Israeli prime minister David Ben-Gurion and an avowed secular socialist, would not consider her daughter-in-law, a Reform convert, Jewish until she had an Orthodox conversion.

MK Yariv Levin, despite being secular, openly has criticized the Reform movement stating that "Reform Jews in the United States are a dying world. Assimilation is taking place on a vast scale. They are not even tracking this properly in their communities. It is evidenced by the fact that a man who calls himself a Reform rabbi stands there with a priest and officiates at the wedding of the daughter of Hillary Clinton and no one condemns it, thereby legitimizing it."

=== Names of converts ===
Throughout Jewish history converts have been referred to by a variety of names and titles. Ancient sources and tombstones regularly refer to them as "proselytes", "righteous proselytes", "converts", and some even refer to them using their former identity. For instance, in Mishnah Yadayim 4:4, a convert is referred to as Yehudah Ger Ammoni (Yehudah the Ammonite convert).

Some converts choose to label themselves as being Jewish-by-choice, while others do not prefer this label.

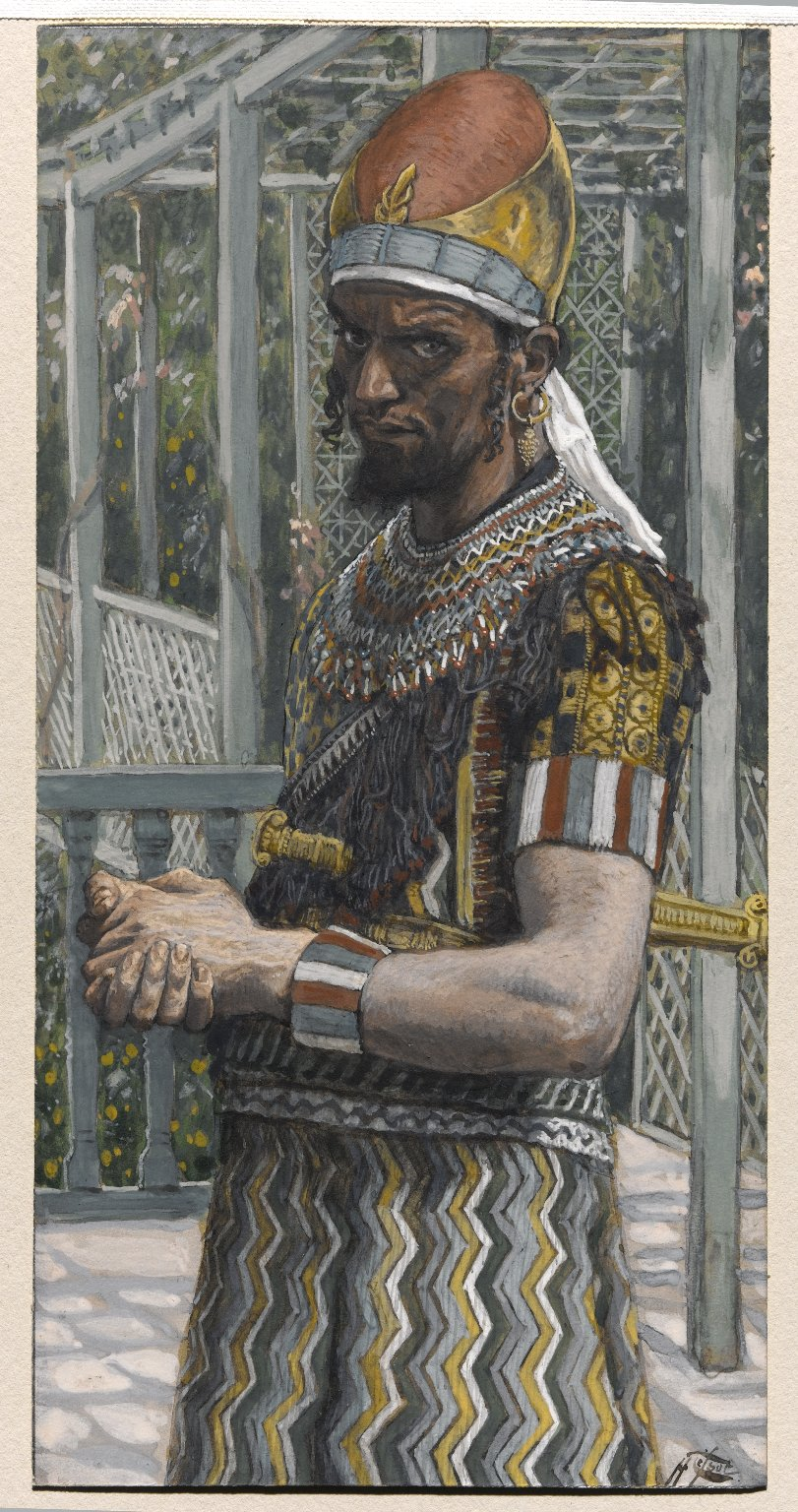
Herod's father was referred to as Antipater the Idumaean due to his Edomite origin.

=== Ethnicity and race ===
Traditionally, there exists no distinction between ethnicity and religion in Jewish culture. Even the modern concepts of ethnicity and religion were not present when Jewish civilization first emerged, making concepts such as "ethnic Jews" and "religious Jews" nonexistent in ancient sources.

Similar to the concept of Roman citizenship and Hellenic identity, Jewish identity is one that encompasses a wide range of ethnic, religious, tribal, and national concepts which work together in tandem to form the entire framework of Jewish identity. As such, Jewish identity is regularly categorized as an ethnic, religious, or mixed identity when utilizing modern Western understandings of peoplehood.

In Israel, all Jews are defined as ethnic Jews, regardless if the individual was born Jewish or converted.

Race, much like ethnicity, is not a concept found in traditional Judaism. The concept of a Jewish race is one that emerged in the 19th and 20th centuries. Skin color and other physical features are not determining factors in regards to Jewishness.

=== Negation of familial relationships ===
Per Jewish law, a convert is like a newborn child, and thus biological parental ties are spiritually severed upon their conversion. Despite this, a convert is still required to honor their parents, as mandated by Jewish law. Converts are not required to perform Jewish mourning rituals for the deaths of their gentile parents.

=== Distinctions between born-Jews and gerim ===
There is no distinction between born-Jews and gerim in the eyes of traditional Jewish law, in most cases. The few distinctions that do exist are that a ger cannot sit on a Jewish court in many cases, a ger cannot marry a Kohen (Jewish priest), and a ger can never be in a position of absolute authority over born-Jews (such as becoming a monarch).

Convert status does not extend to the children of converts, as they would be considered born-Jews.

== Around the world ==
=== Russian Empire and Soviet Union ===
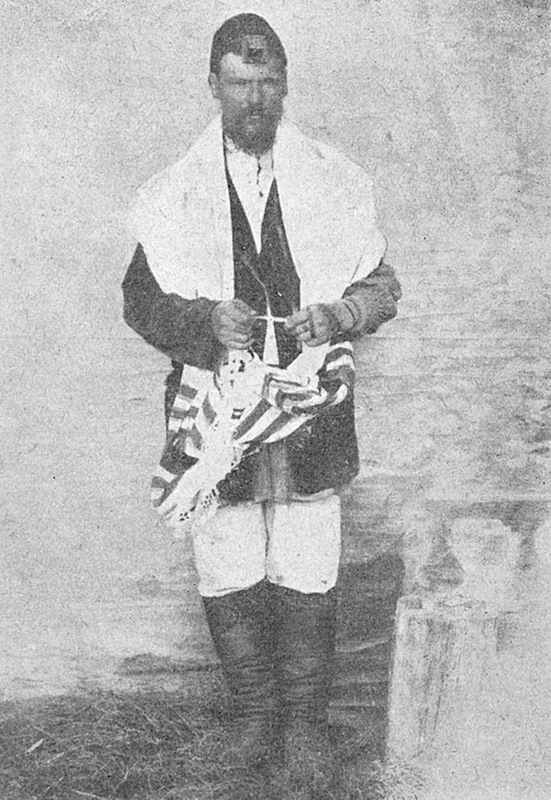
A Subbotnik man, with tefillin and tallit, in the early 1900s.

Groups of Slavic Christian peasants began to appropriate certain elements of Jewish culture and religion beginning in the 19th century, resulting in persecution and deportation under Tsar Alexander I. Called Subbotniks, many eventually converted to Judaism, and settled in the Land of Israel.

Groups of Subbotnik Jews still exist in formerly Soviet countries, such as in the village of Privolnoye, Azerbaijan.

An entire Ukrainian village near Uman converted to Judaism and became Breslov Hasidim. Many were later victims of pogroms committed against the Jewish community in the region during World War I.

=== Ethiopia ===
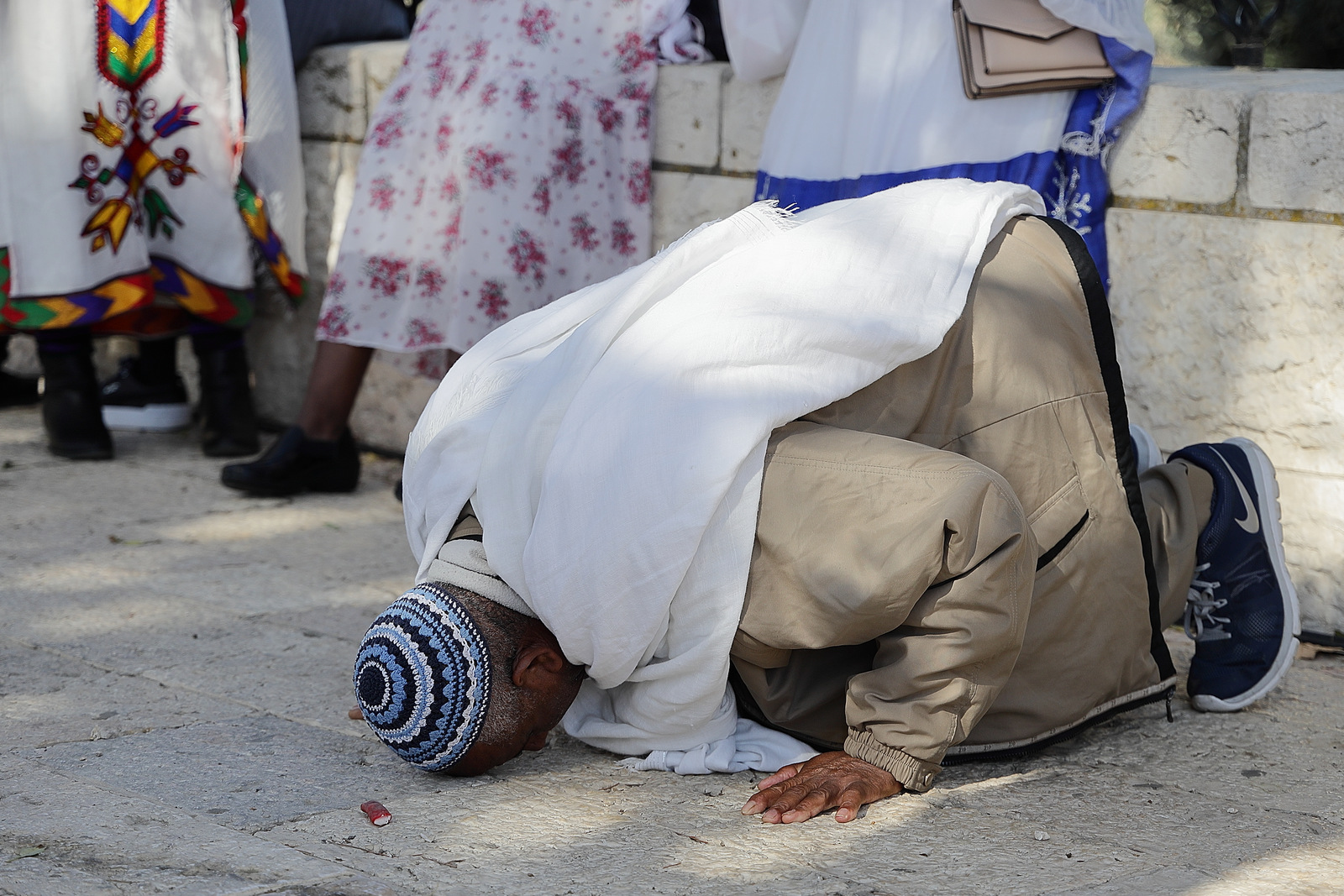
Beta Israel man during Sigd in Jerusalem.

Many researchers believe the Beta Israel, much like the Subbotniks, adopted a Jewish identity without formal conversion or were converted by Jews from Yemen who settled in the region during the Middle Ages. Genetic research has shown the group to be closely related to the Cushitic-speaking Agaw people, however other research indicates an Israelite origin of the community.

=== Khazar Khaganate ===
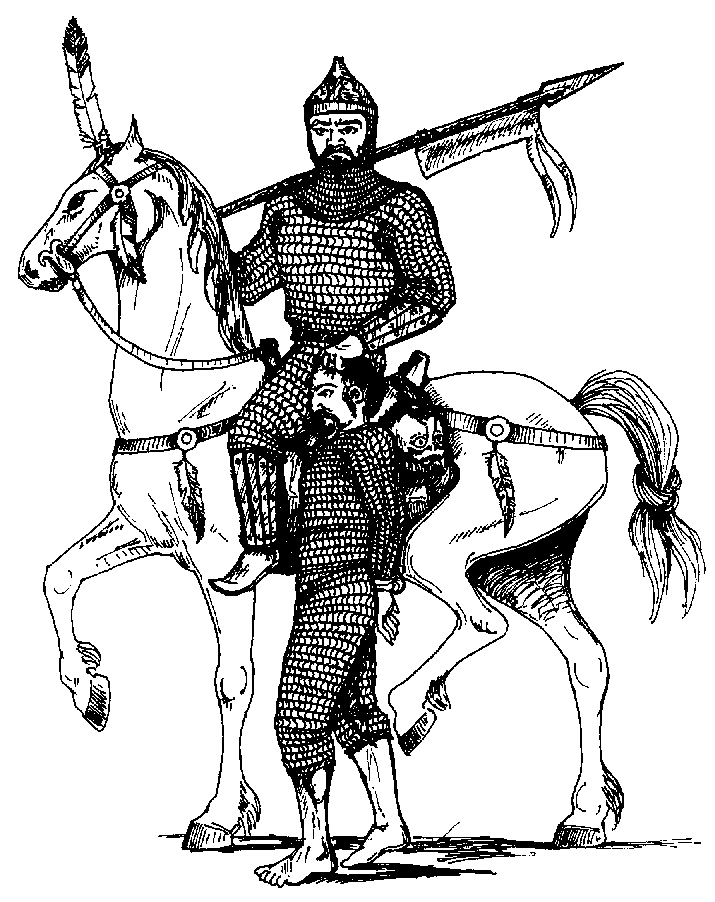
Khazar warrior and prisoner

During the Middle Ages, it was believed the nobility of the Khazar Khaganate converted to Judaism. However, the claim is doubted by many researchers. Though there was a confirmed presence of Jews in the kingdom and the existence of Khazar gerim, notably a diaspora community in Spain after the fall of the Khazars, there is no confirmed evidence of mass conversion to Judaism.

=== Myanmar and India ===
Some Tibeto-Burmese-speaking people on the border between India and Myanmar, such as the Kuki, have begun converting to Judaism due to a belief in descent from a Lost Tribe of Israel, specifically the Tribe of Manasseh. Due to this belief, they've adopted the name Bnei Menashe (Children of Manasseh). They number around 10,000, with half of residing in India, and the other half in Israel.

=== United States ===
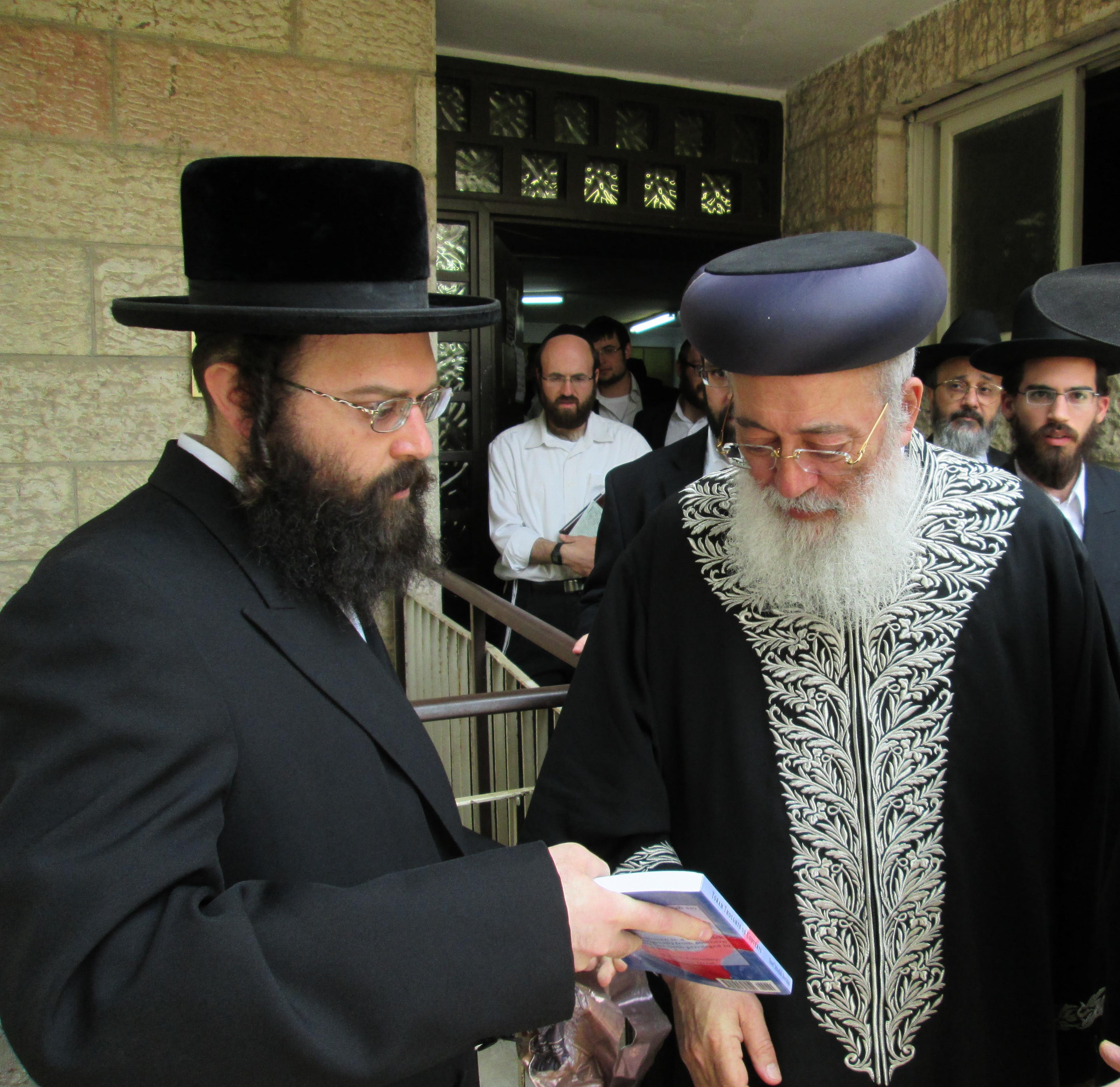
American convert, Joseph J. Sherman, with Sephardic Chief Rabbi Shlomo Amar.

According to the Pew Research Center, up to 1 in 6 (approximately 1,275,000) Jewish-Americans are gerim.

Although rare, mass conversions to Judaism have occurred in the United States. For instance, in Show Low, Arizona, 21 individuals converted in September 2023.

- Reuben Greenberg - First black police chief of Charleston, South Carolina.
- Sammy Davis Jr. - Singer and actor.
- Ivanka Trump - Daughter of the 47th President of the United States, Donald Trump.
- Eli HaZe'ev - Vietnam War veteran and victim of the 1980 Hebron terrorist attack.
- Y-Love - Hip-hop artist.
- Louis Ferrante - Former Italian-American mobster.

=== Israel ===
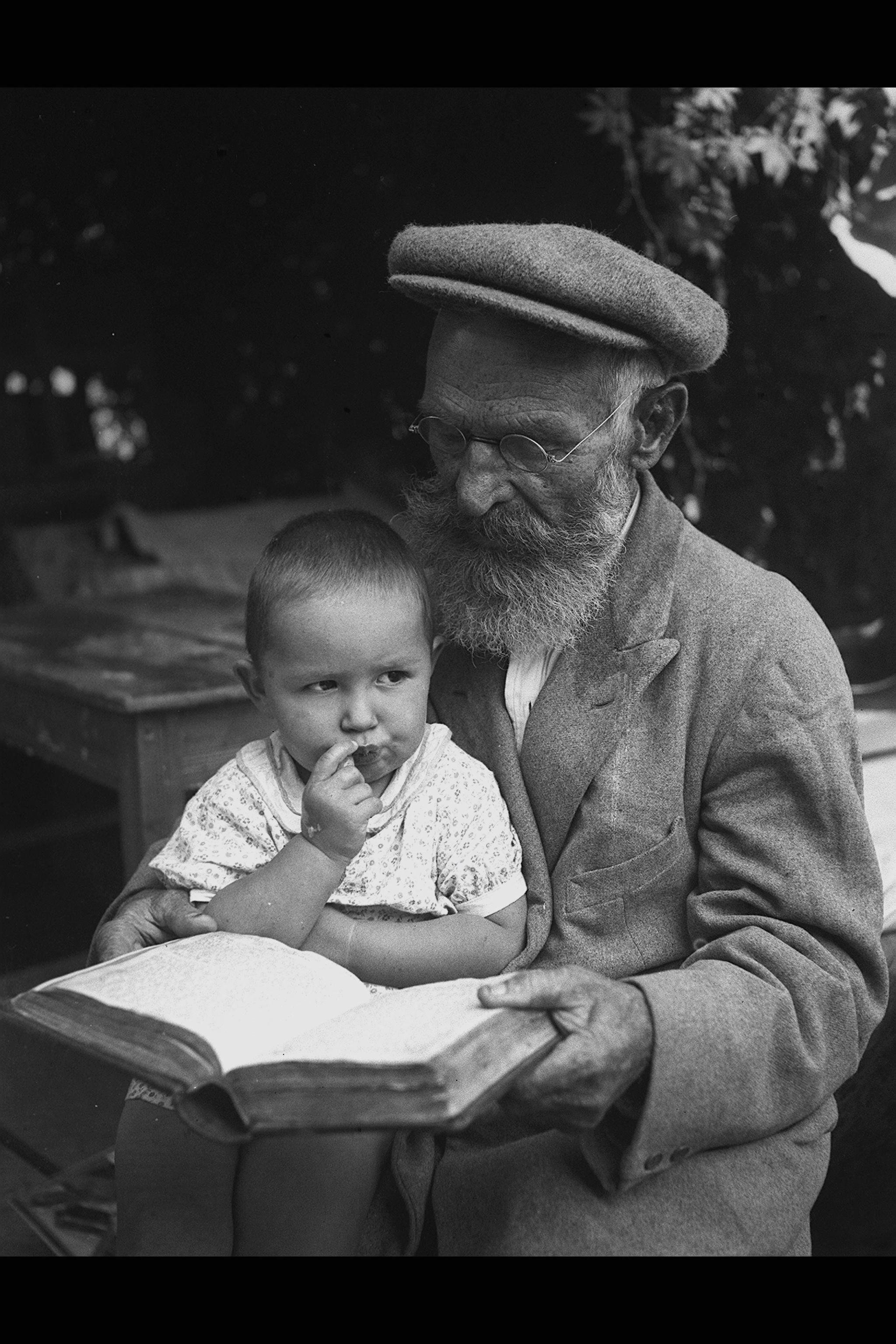
A Dutch ger and his grandson in Nahalat Yitzhak, Israel. (1934)

Since 2016, about 3,000 people convert to Judaism every year in Israel through programs approved by the Chief Rabbinate. Between 1996 and 2021, 101,609 individuals have successfully completed approved conversion programs, with most being Soviet immigrants who were not halakhically Jewish (oftentimes only having one Jewish grandparent).

Converts are eligible under the Law of Return to become Israeli citizens, however only converts through Jewish courts recognized by the Chief Rabbinate of Israel are recognized halakhically as Jewish within the country.

- Nissim Black - American-Israeli rapper.
- Amar'e Stoudemire - American-Israeli basketball player.
- Mike Flanagan - Irish-Israeli soldier who defected from the British Army.
- Anastassia Michaeli - Russian-Israeli politician.
- Reuel Abraham - German-Israeli former Luftwaffe pilot during World War II who, after witnessing a massacre of Jews during the Holocaust, feigned illness to get out of combat, donated money to Jewish victims, and made aliyah from Germany.

=== Palestinian Arabs ===
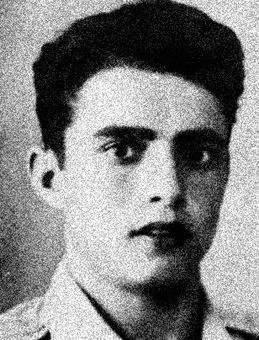
Baruch Mizrahi

Though rare, some Palestinians Arabs have converted to Judaism.

- Baruch Mizrahi - An Arab convert to Judaism, he joined the Irgun and was killed during the 1948 Palestine war by Arab forces.
- David ben Avraham: Inspired by his grandfather's actions during the 1929 Hebron massacre, in which he saved 25 Jews, Ben Avraham converted to Judaism. An IDF reservist killed him during the Gaza war, believing he was a terrorist due to his accent and lack of Israeli identification at a border checkpoint.

=== Peru ===
The B'nai Moshe, also known as the Inca Jews, are a group of 900 Peruvian gerim in Israel, primarily Judea and Samaria. Originally from Trujillo, a significant portion of the community made aliyah in the 1990s.

=== South Africa ===
A growing number of Afrikaners have undergone conversion in recent years, with many opting to make aliyah to Israel from South Africa.

== See also ==
- Conversion to Judaism
- Jewish identity
- Jewish peoplehood
- Sephardic Bnei Anusim
- Zera Yisrael
- Anusim
