= Ben Bag-Bag =

Talmud rabbi

Ben Bag-Bag (Hebrew: בֶּן בַּג בַּג, literally, son of Bag-Bag) was a rabbinic sage and disciple of Hillel the Elder during the late Zugot or early Tannaitic period. Aside from a single maxim quoted toward the end of tractate Avot—commonly referred to as Pirkei Avot—of the Mishnah, he is not mentioned elsewhere in the Mishnah (though he is mentioned in tractate Pesachim 96a:9 of the Talmud, among other instances). The maxim, in Israeli Jewish scholar Rabbi Joshua Kulp's translation of Pirkei Avot 5:22, reads:

Turn it over, and [again] turn it over, for all is therein. And look into it; and become old and gray therein; and do not move away from it, for you have no better portion than it.

This maxim is followed by that of another sage, ben Hei-Hei (בֶּן הֵא הֵא). Wilhelm Bacher, in Agadat Hatana'im, wrote that some consider ben Bag-Bag and ben Hei-Hei to be the same individual.

A legend reported in Tosafot's commentary on tractate Chagigah 9b:10 is that both ben Bag-Bag and ben Hei-Hei were converts to Judaism, or gerim in Hebrew. Some speculate that the unusual names the individuals were given in Rabbinic literature were intended to conceal their identities from Roman authorities during the empire's occupation of Judaea. Another tradition holds that ben Bag-Bag was the man—sometimes described as a Roman soldier—who, in a tale of Rabbis Hillel and Shammai, requested they teach him the whole Torah while standing on one foot.

Some also identify ben Bag-Bag with Yoḥanan ben Bag-Bag (יוֹחָנָן בֶּן בַּג בַּג), a tanna mentioned in tractate Kiddushin 10b:4.
