= Rachel Shabi =

British journalist and author (born 1973)

- רחל שאבי
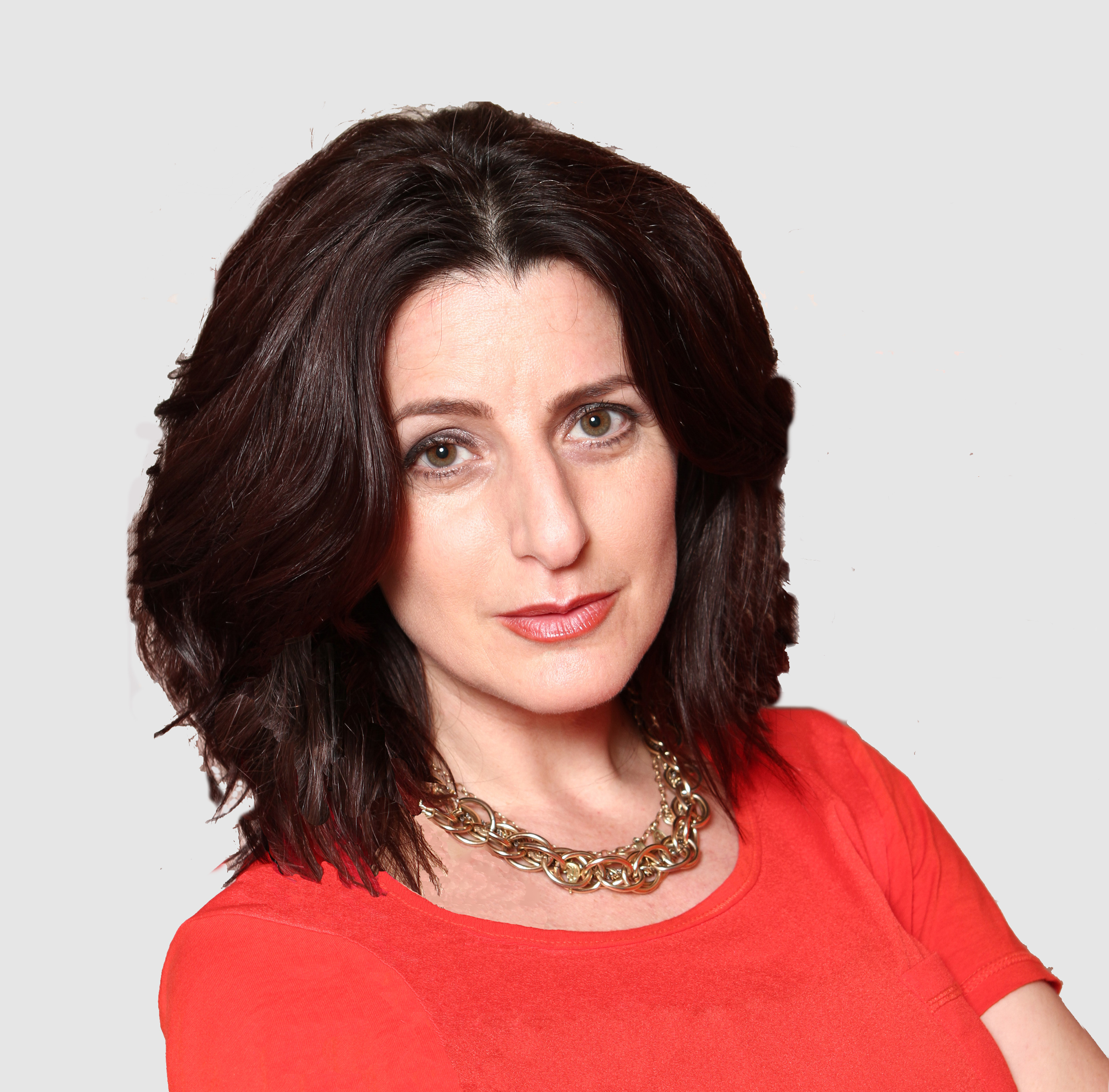
- Shabi in 2017
- Born: 30 March 1973 (age 53); Ramat Gan, Israel
- Education: University of Edinburgh
- Occupations: Journalist and author

Rachel Shabi (Hebrew: רחל שאבי) is a British-Israeli journalist and author. She is a contributing writer to The Guardian and the author of We Look Like the Enemy: The Hidden Story of Israel's Jews from Arab Lands.

== Early life ==
Born in Ramat Gan, Israel to Iraqi Jewish parents Shabi grew up in the United Kingdom. She studied politics and literature at the University of Edinburgh.

== Career ==
Shabi is a journalist based in the UK, having also reported from the Middle East including on the Israeli–Palestinian conflict and from Tunisia and Egypt. As well as focusing on the Middle East, she writes about progressive politics, the far right, counter-extremism and migration. She is also the author of We Look Like the Enemy: Israel's Jews from Arab Lands, and appears as a commentator on international news channels.

Shabi has written for publications including The Guardian, The New York Times, The Times, The Independent, Al Jazeera English, Foreign Policy, Prospect and the New Statesman.

Her book We Look Like the Enemy: Israel's Jews from Arab Lands was published in 2009. In the book, Shabi argues that Israel has discriminated against and culturally stripped its Jewish population from Arab and Muslim countries. The book received a National Jewish Book Award.

Shabi was shortlisted for the 2011 Orwell journalism prize and was a joint winner in the Press Category of the Anna Lindh Journalist Award for reporting across cultures (for her article "We were looking for a nice, peaceful place near Jerusalem", published by The Guardian) the same year. In 2013, Shabi won the International Media Awards' Cutting Edge Media award.

In September 2017, Iain Dale placed Shabi at No. 30 on his list of 'The 100 Most Influential People on the Left', up sixty places on his previous listing, noting that, "Omnipresent on our screens, the redoubtable Shabi is one of the few Corbyn supporting commentators to be taken seriously by the media. Thoughtful and fluent, she deserves her massive rise in this year's list."

Shabi identifies as an Arab Jew and has lamented the stigmatisation of Arab-Jewish culture in Israel.

In March 2025, Shabi signed an open letter to British Secretary of State David Lammy, asking him and the British government to pressure Israel to end the Gaza war following a second raid on the Educational Bookshop in Jerusalem, denouncing Israel's actions as "genocidal violence".

== Bibliography ==
- We Look Like the Enemy: The Hidden Story of Israel's Jews from Arab Lands. Bloomsbury Publishing. 2009. ISBN 978-0802715722.
- Off-White: The Truth About Anti-Semitism. Oneworld Publications. 2024. ISBN 978-0861548378.
