= Reuel Abraham =

German Hitler Youth member who converted to Judaism (1924–1995)

Reuel Abraham (born Karl Heinz Schneider; 1924–1995) was a German Hitler Youth member and Luftwaffe pilot during World War II reported to be the first former Nazi to convert to Judaism.

== World War II ==
In 1942 Schneider joined the Luftwaffe serving as a dive bomber pilot. Stationed in Poland, he witnessed the execution of a group of Jews by members of the SS. According to Schneider, following this experience he began to pretend to be ill in order to avoid combat, missed assigned targets, and tampered with bombs to prevent detonation. As a penitence following the war, he worked for twenty years as a coal miner, donating two thirds of his income anonymously to groups supporting Jewish orphans and survivors of the concentration camps.

== Emigration and conversion ==
In 1965 he immigrated to Israel, buying a farm in Galilee. Schneider changed his name to Reuel Abraham, converted to Judaism, and became a citizen of Israel. He was circumcised in a hospital in Haifa. Abraham died in 1995.
