= David Rabeeya =

American author and educator (1938–2022)

- דוד רביעיה
- Born: Hikmat Rabeeya; May 12, 1938; Baghdad, Iraq
- Died: February 18, 2022 (aged 83); Philadelphia, Pennsylvania, U.S.
- Occupations: Educator, Author, Poet
- Writing career
- Genre: Non-fiction
- Subjects: Iraqi Affairs, Judaism, Women's Issues, Rational Thought
- Website: rabeeya.blogspot.com

David Rabeeya (Hebrew: דוד רביעיה; May 12, 1938 – February 18, 2022) was an Israeli-American author and professor of Hebrew and Judaic Studies.

Dr. Rabeeya was a practicing Sephardic Jew born in Baghdad, Iraq and raised in an Arabic household. His family moved to Israel in 1951. In 1970, he moved to the United States. Dr. Rabeeya taught students at elementary school, high school, and university levels. He worked for 33 years at Bryn Mawr College where he was a lecturer in the Program in Hebrew and Judaic Studies. Dr. Rabeeya has written books on various subjects focusing on the Middle East and the relationship between Jews and other groups.

Rabeeya died on February 18, 2022, in Philadelphia, Pennsylvania, at the age of 83.

== Books ==
- America: Criticize It But Stay
- The Journey of an Arab-Jew: Through the American Maze
- Baghdadi Treasures: Challenging Ideas & Humorous Sayings
- Israel: Stripped Bare
- Women's Struggles; Women's Dreams
- Rabeeya's Reflections: Love, Sex and Wit
- Sephardic Lolita: Judeo-Arabic Restoration And Reconciliation
- Fruma: Caught in Her Web
- A Humanistic Siddur of Spirituality And Meaning: The American Character; We Rationalize Everything
- 1,001 Jokes About Rabbis: And The Rest Of The World
- Afifah: A Bedouin Odyssey
- Fundamentalism: Roots, Causes and Implications
- Zionism: Final Call
- Homosexuals under Sharia Law
- Visionary Memoir
- Quarter in Half Time
- The Journey of an Arab-Jew in European Israel
- A Guide to Understanding Judaism and Islam: More Similarities Than differences
- Sephardic Recipes: Delicacies from Baghdad
