= Baruch Mizrahi =

Arab Zionist militant (1926–1948)

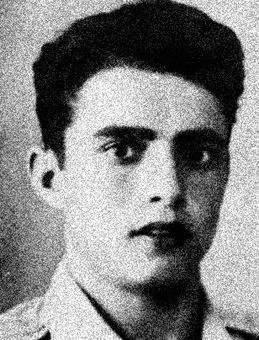
- Native name: ברוך מזרחי
- Born: Ḥamuda Abu Al-Anyan; 1926; Safed, Mandatory Palestine
- Died: April 18, 1948 (aged 21–22) Jenin, Mandatory Palestine
- Buried: Netanya, Israel
- Allegiance: Irgun
- Conflicts: 1947–1948 civil war in Mandatory Palestine †

Baruch Mizrahi (Hebrew: ברוך מזרחי; born Ḥamuda Abu Al-Anyan; 1926 – April 18, 1948) was a Palestinian Arab Muslim convert to Judaism, and a member of the Irgun ("The National Military Organization in the Land of Israel") during the Jewish insurgency in Mandatory Palestine. He became fascinated by the Yishuv, and eventually converted to Judaism. During the 1947–1948 civil war in Mandatory Palestine, he and three others were detained by an Arab police officer, brought before a court headed by the Arab Liberation Army, and executed for collaborating with Zionist forces.

== Biography ==
Ḥamuda Abu Al-Anyan (Arabic: حمودة أبو العنين), son of Mahmoud and Fatima, was born into a well-known nationalist family from Safed. At a young age, he became interested in his Jewish neighbors and eventually approached Betar members in Safed who had gathered at the HaMeiri Dairy. At one point he left the Arab government school in Safed and went to study at the local Jewish school, despite opposition from his family. Hamuda, who was the only Arab student in a Jewish school, was accepted by the Jewish students, including future Knesset member Avner Shaki.

When his mother died, Hamuda's relationship with his father deteriorated. He soon left the house and moved to Haifa, determined to convert to Judaism. After undergoing the conversion process, he became known as Avraham ben Avraham. Later, after joining the Irgun, he adopted the name Baruch Mizrahi.

Shortly after joining the Betar branch in Haifa, Mizrahi joined the Irgun and took part in activities against the British. During one of the operations, he was apprehended and sent to the Latrun detention camp. He was held there for several months, until he was sent along with 55 other Etzel and Lehi exiles to Eritrea. When they didn't allow him to take anything, he insisted on taking a tallit and tefillin. About three weeks after arriving in Eritrea, Mizrahi was severely injured by the Sudanese guards, in an incident where 14 detainees were shot, two of them fatally, on January 17, 1946. He was operated on for 24 hours by a British doctor and survived. Later on, his friend Danny Meterscu told him with amusement that after receiving 20 doses of English blood, he was no longer Jewish. Only after realizing it was a joke, did Mizrahi, whose new identity as a Jew and a Zionist was so important to him, relax. He later took part in attempts to escape the detention camps.

After two years of exile in Africa, Mizrahi was suddenly released, returned to Palestine and became very active in the Irgun, later joining a group of Jewish Brigade veterans who established the Margolin outpost near Beit Lid Junction, Nordia. He continued to carry out intelligence activities within the framework of the Arab Department of the Irgun, and on April 18, 1948, he was sent to an intelligence gathering in preparation for an operation in Jenin. While on-route to Jenin from Haifa, his bus was stopped for routine inspection in the Megiddo area. The Arab policeman at the checkpoint identified Mizrahi by the golden tooth in his mouth, and he, along with three Arabs he had befriended during the journey, were brought before a court headed by the Arab Liberation Army in Jaba, which sentenced them to death for collaborating with Zionist forces. His fate was not known at the time, and he was declared absent until 1968.

== Aftermath ==
After the Six-Day War, journalist Yehezkel Hameiri began to investigate the fate of Mizrahi. He went to the village of Jaba near Nablus, heard from the locals about "the Jew" executed by soldiers of Kaukji and eventually arrived at the cave where Mizrahi was buried. During the search, the body of the three executed Arabs were found buried with Mizrahi, who was identified by the structure of his teeth and golden tooth. On October 9, 1969, Mizrahi was buried with full military honors as a Jew in the military section of the Netanya cemetery. Among the escorts was Menachem Begin and Chief Rabbi Shlomo Goren.

Beginning in 2015, the Shomron Regional Council began organizing annual pilgrimages to Mizrahi's grave on the anniversary of his death.
