= Johanan (2nd century rabbi) =

Johanan ben Torta (Hebrew: יוחנן בן תורתא, read as Yochanan ben Torta) was a rabbi of the early 2nd century (third generation of tannaim).

He was one of the main opponents of the Bar Kokhba revolt:

Shimon bar Yochai recounts: Rabbi Akiva would elucidate, "A star has came forth out of Jacob" [as] '[Bar] Kozba' has came forth out of Jacob'. When Akiva would see 'Bar Kokhba', he would say: 'This is the King Messiah'. [And then] R. Johanan ben Torta would tell him: "Akiva, Grass shall grow from your cheeks and yet the son of David shall not appear."

== Name ==
His name translates to "Johanan, son of the cow", and he is associated with the story of the "cow which kept Shabbat", in which a Jewish-owned cow was accustomed not to work on Shabbat (see Exodus 20:9). Upon being sold to a non-Jew, the cow refused to work on Shabbat, until the non-Jew complained about the defective animal he was sold. The Jew instructed the cow to work on Shabbat since it was no longer Jewish-owned, and the cow began to work. The non-Jew was so impressed by this that he decided to convert to Judaism. In different versions of the story, Johanan ben Torta was either the Jew who sold the cow, or the non-Jew who converted.
