= Privolnoye, Azerbaijan =

Privolnoye
- Municipality
- Location within Azerbaijan
- Coordinates: 39°07′44″N 48°32′14″E
- Country: Azerbaijan
- Rayon: Jalilabad

Population
  - Total: 4,268
- Time zone: UTC+4 (AZT)
  - Summer (DST): UTC+5 (AZT)

Privolnoye is a village and municipality in the Jalilabad Rayon of Azerbaijan. It has a population of 4,268.
